= Eberswalde–Frankfurt (Oder) railway =

Railway line in Germany

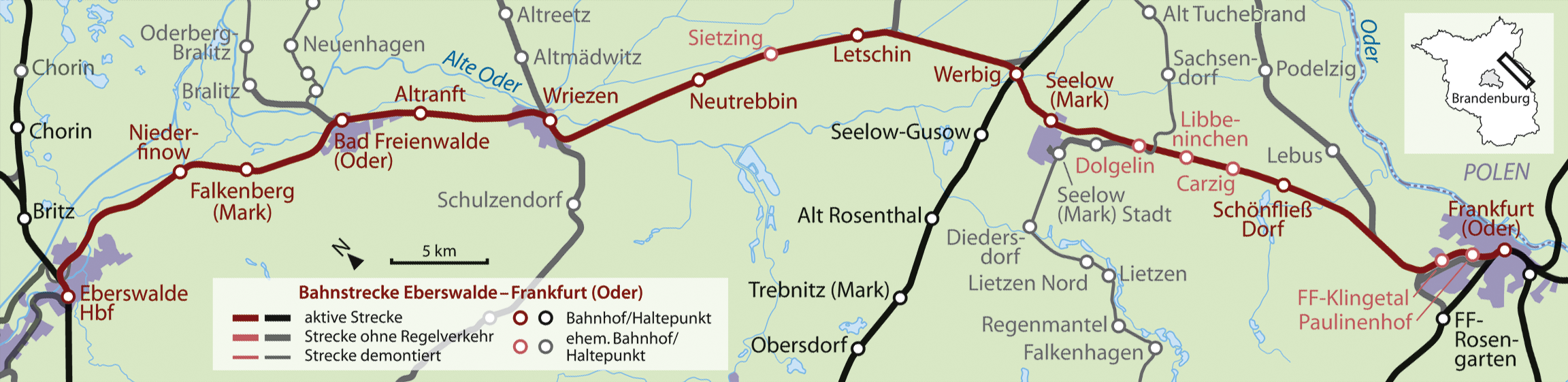

Overview
- Owner: DB Netz
- Line number: 6758 (Eberswalde–Werbig junction); 6156 (Werbig–Frankfurt (Oder) junction)
- Locale: Brandenburg, Germany

Service
- Route number: 209.60
- Operator(s): Niederbarnimer Eisenbahn

Technical
- Line length: 86.0 km (53.4 mi)
- Number of tracks: 2 (Booßen–Frankfurt)
- Track gauge: 1,435 mm (4 ft 8 1/2 in) standard gauge
- Operating speed: Eberswalde–Werbig: 60 km/h (37.3 mph) (max); Werbig–Frankfurt (Oder): 100 km/h (62.1 mph) (max)

The Eberswalde–Frankfurt (Oder) railway is a single-track line in the districts of Barnim and Märkisch-Oderland and the town of Frankfurt (Oder), in the German state of Brandenburg. The section from Eberswalde to Werbig junction is now a branch line, the adjoining section to the south to Frankfurt (Oder) is classified as a main line. The line is about 86 kilometres long and is served by line RB60 of the Niederbarnimer Eisenbahn (NEB).

== Route ==
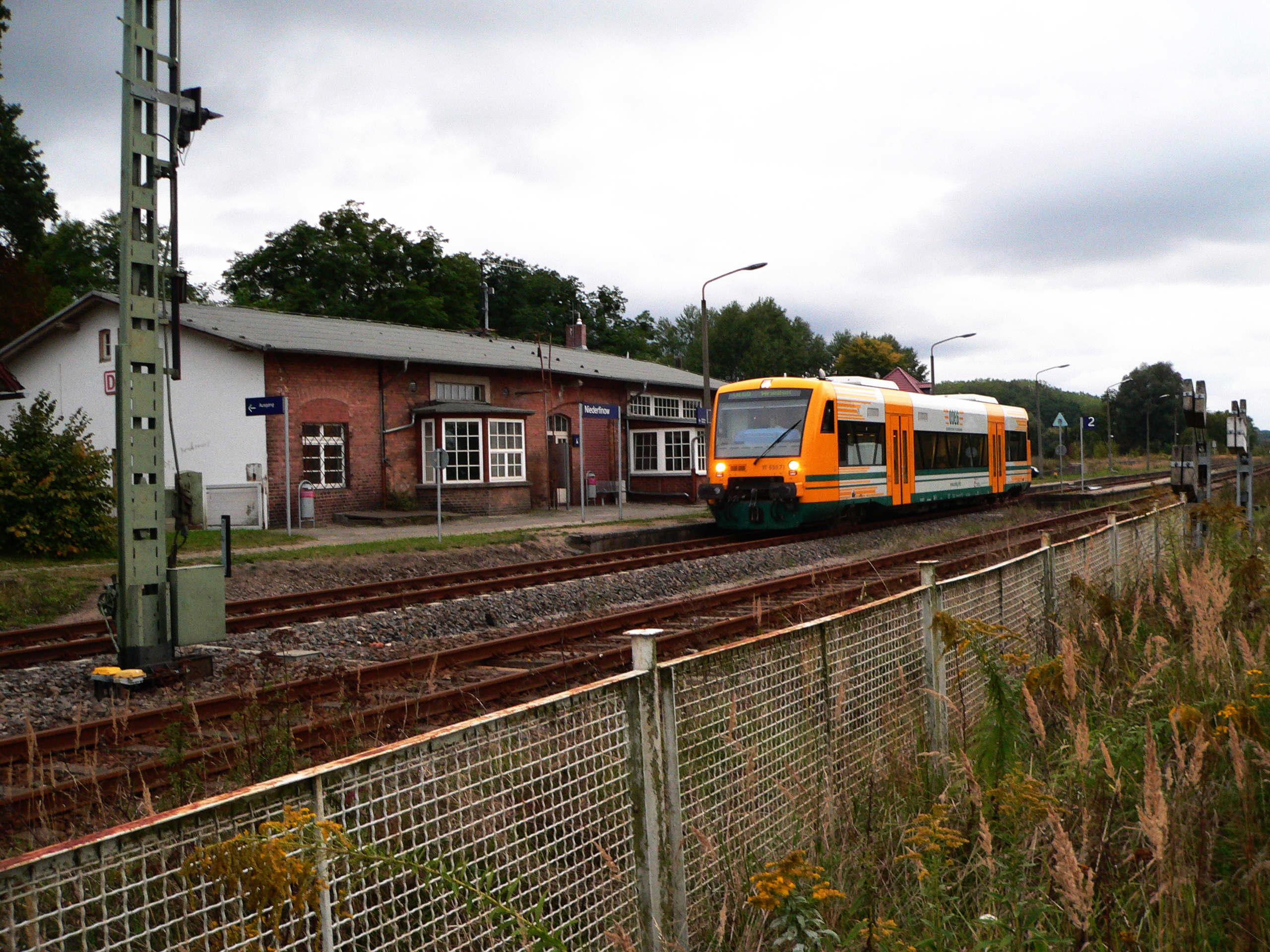
ODEG DMU in Niederfinow station

The line starts at Eberswalde Hauptbahnhof and separates to it north from the Berlin–Szczecin railway and runs to the east. The direct connection from this line towards Szczecin has been dismantled. The line runs parallel with the Finow Canal at first and then swings to the southeast after Niederfinow station. The line runs parallel to the Alte Oder, the westerly outflow of the Oderbruch swamp, through Bad Freienwalde and Wriezen, both former railway junctions, to Werbig station, which is built on two-level as an interchange with the Prussian Eastern Railway. After Werbig it runs south via Seelow to the end of the line at Frankfurt (Oder) station. In Booßen there used to be a junction with the line to Küstrin-Kietz, which was dismantled after World War II.

== History ==
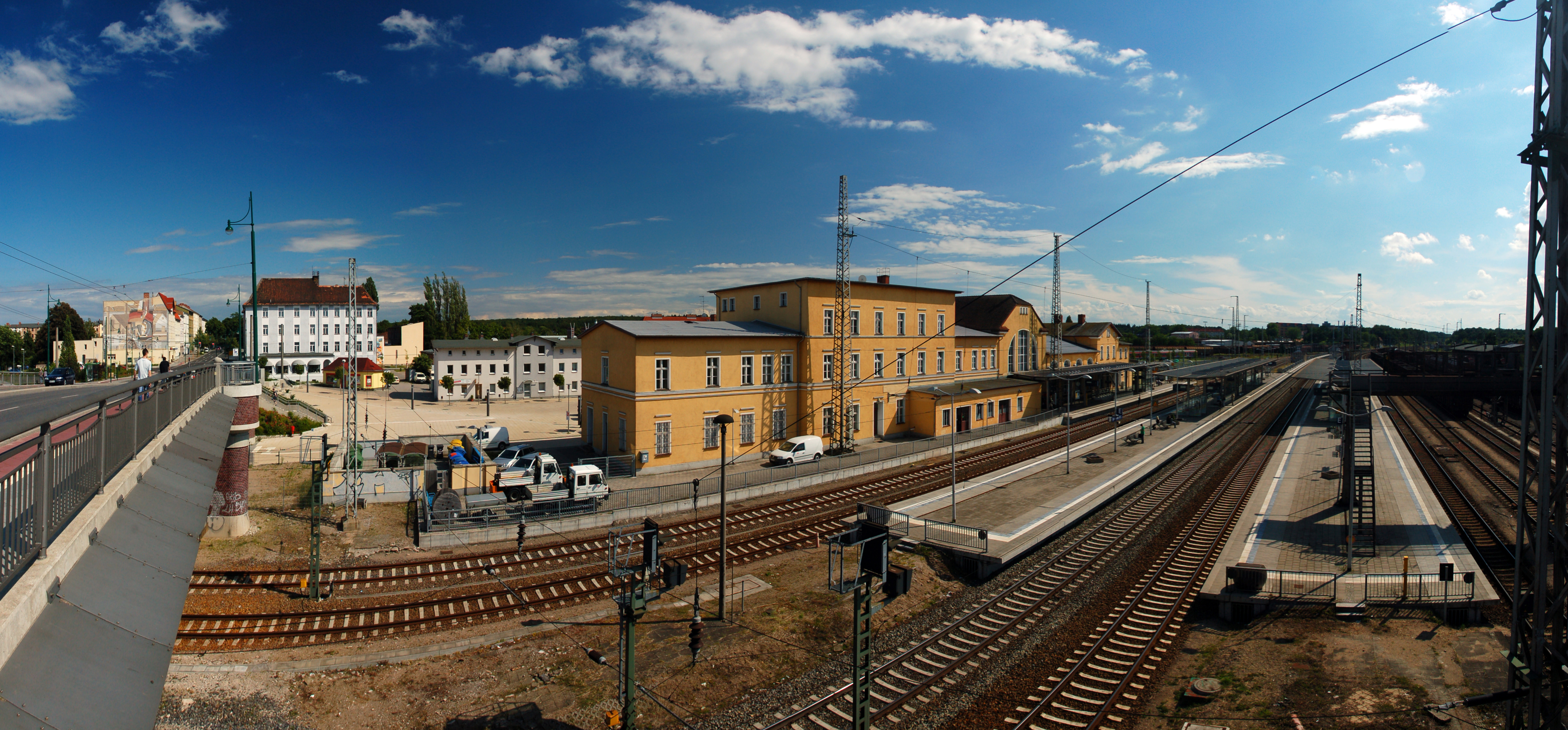
Eberswalde Hauptbahnhof

The line was built in 1865/66 as a single-track line by the Berlin-Stettin Railway Company (German: Berlin-Stettiner Eisenbahn-Gesellschaft, BStE) and opened between Eberswalde and Wriezen on 15 December 1866 as a branch line. The main purpose of the railway was to promote the development of the Oderbruch. The continuation of the line to Frankfurt, however, was soon required. The implementation of this project was, however, to take another ten years and construction only started as a result of the construction of the parallel Wroclaw–Szczecin railway of the Breslau-Schweidnitz-Freiburg Railway Company (Breslau-Schweidnitz-Freiburger Eisenbahn-Gesellschaft). The latter planned to build its line as a direct link between the Upper Silesian coal basin and the Baltic Sea. Since the BStE expected this would lead to a loss of revenue, it decided to build a largely parallel line west of the Oder using existing sections of the Lower Silesian-Märkisch Railway and the Berlin-Stettin main line. The extension to Frankfurt (Oder) was opened in three sections:

- 1 July 1876: Wriezen–Letschin
- 1 January 1877: Letschin–Seelow
- 15 May 1877: Seelow–Frankfurt (Oder).

Together with the 30 kilometre long Angermünde–Freienwalde line, which was opened on 1 January 1877, this created a second direct railway between Breslau (Wrocław) and Stettin (Szczecin). Although the line linked to existing junctions such as Frankfurt (Oder), it gained importance as an alternative to the line on the east side of the Oder and especially for the carriage of local traffic.

Stations were construction between Bad Freienwalde and Frankfurt on the line in Wriezen, Letschin, Neutrebbin, Letschin, Seelow and Schönfließ. In July 1880, a two-level interchange station was opened at Werbig at the intersection with the Eastern Railway to Berlin and a station was opened in Alt-Ranft. In May 1881, stations were opened in Booßen and Dolgelin and, in 1882, a connecting curve to the Eastern Railway was opened in Werbig for freight. A station was also built in Sietzing in this period. Carzig station was established later and Libbenichen station was built in the 1930s.

After the nationalisation of the BStE in 1879, the entire line was transferred to the Prussian state railways as part of the Royal Division of the Berlin-Stettin Railway (Königlichen Direktion der Berlin-Stettiner Eisenbahn, called Königliche Eisenbahndirektion Stettin from 1905). This led to the duplication of the line between Eberswalde and Freienwalde in 1905.

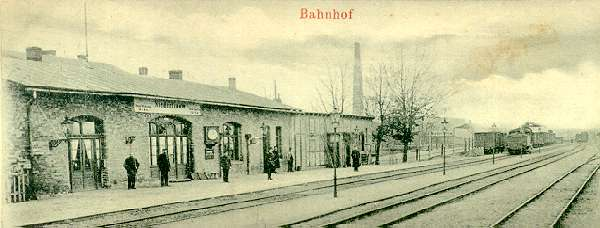
Niederfinow station about 1901

At the beginning of the 20th century, plans were developed to establish a separate marshalling yard because of limited space in Frankfurt station. After much discussion about the location of the new yard, it was eventually decided to build it on the Eberswalde line between Frankfurt and Booßen. The line in this section had to be moved to the east and Booßen station was also moved. Work began on 1 April 1910 and work on the infrastructure was largely completed at the beginning of the First World War. Because many tracks were occupied by the military during the war, its commissioning was delayed to 1917. Connecting lines were built from Rosengarten on the line to Berlin and from Booßen to Wüste Kunersdorf junction near Lebus on the line to Küstrin. The line between Frankfurt and Booßen was duplicated.

After 1920, the line and the railway division of Stettin were absorbed into the railway division (Reichsbahndirektion) of Stettin of Deutsche Reichsbahn.

In 1926, a railcar shuttle service was established between Frankfurt and Booßen, serving in particular the extensive facilities of the marshalling yard. For the service, popularly called the Pendel (pendulum), a separate platform was created in Frankfurt station; it was about the length of a modern tram stop. Table 123d of the 1944/45 timetable included around nine pairs of trains running daily between Berlin, Eberswalde and Wriezen and four pairs of trains running between Wriezen and Frankfurt (Oder). Between the Frankfurt suburb Booßen and Frankfurt (Oder), there were additional suburban trains, which were shown in table 123e as operating almost hourly. The services running to and from Eberswalde did not stop at the three intermediate stations of Paulinenhof, Simonsmühle and Gronenfelde, which were served by the shuttle trains.

During the fighting around Berlin at the end of the Second World War in 1945 the line was in the main combat zone, notably of the Battle of the Seelow Heights. The Wehrmacht operated a special armoured train from Schönfließ. As a result of hostilities, the track was badly damaged and many bridges were destroyed.

=== Developments after 1945 ===
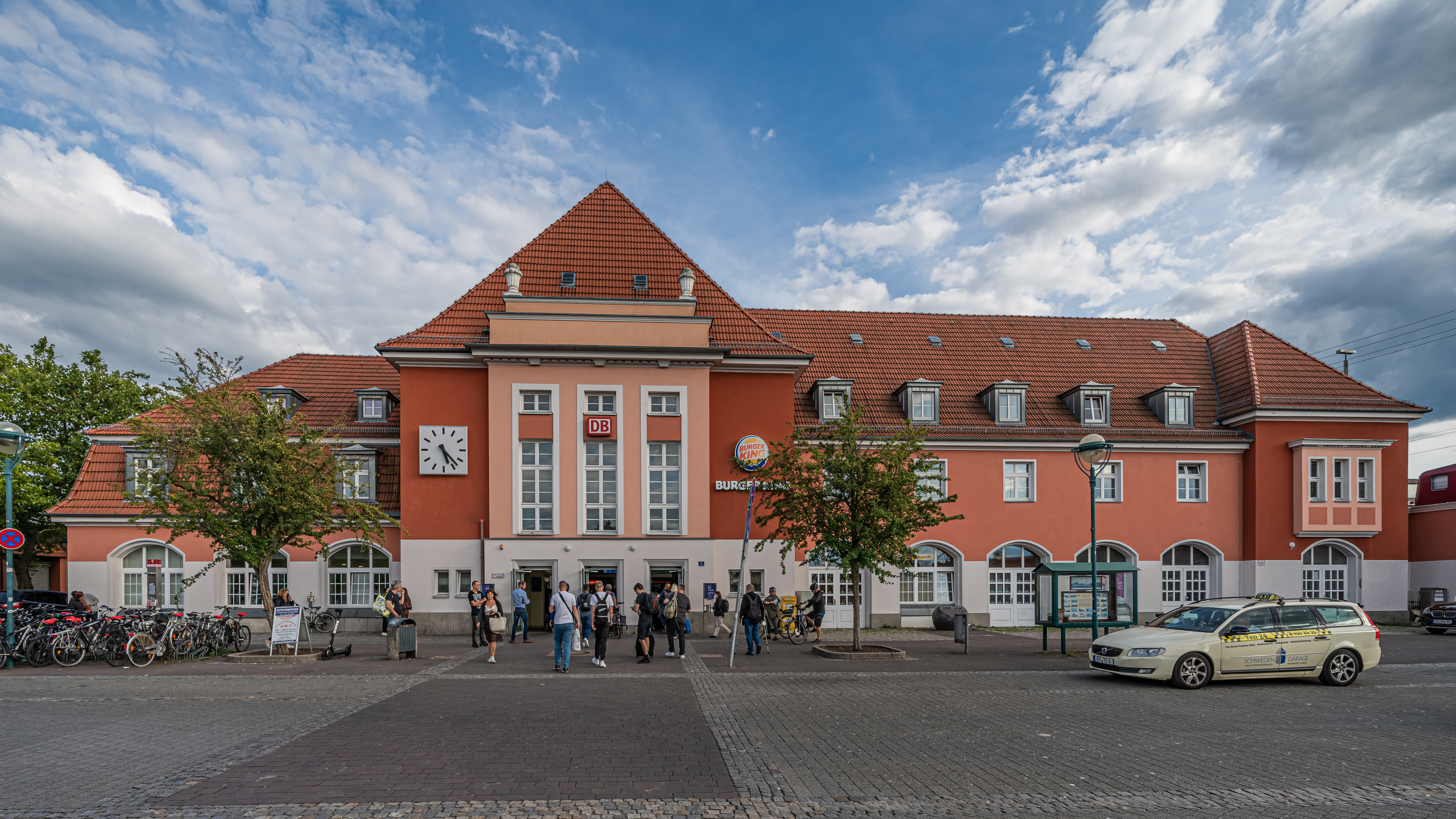
Station building in Frankfurt (Oder)

After the Second World War, the second track between Eberswalde and Bad Freienwalde was removed for reparations. After severe war damage the track had to be rebuilt, as more than half of the bridges were destroyed on many sections. In March 1947, a severe flood caused new damage.

The shuttle train between Frankfurt and Booßen as well as the intermediate stations in Simonsmühle and Paulinenhof were abandoned in 1945 as well as the direct operation of passenger trains between Bad Freienwalde and Berlin via Eberswalde. The declaration of the Oder–Neisse line as the border with Poland, however, meant that the line gained in importance, as it was near the border and was used as a strategic railway. It was also of interest as a possible bypass for the Berlin node. In 1952, Deutsche Reichsbahn built a direct connecting curve of the track to the north in Eberswalde, so as to relieve congestion in Eberswalde station. It was particularly important for freight.

from the 1960s, the line was used by direct express trains from Angermünde via Bad Freienwalde to Frankfurt (Oder), sometimes running further south. Summer holiday trains from Saxony to the Baltic Sea coast also ran on the line. For example, in 1983, the line was served by an express train between Angermünde and Dresden, an express train between Angermünde and Frankfurt (with through coaches from Schwedt) and a summer semi-fast train between Stralsund and Zittau. In addition there six pairs of stopping trains ran over the whole line, with some additional services between Eberswalde and Bad Freienwalde or Wriezen and trains ran between Kietz (now Küstrin-Kietz) and Frankfurt, which following the dismantling of the direct route in 1945 took the Eberswalde line to Booßen.

Since the early 1960s, the line from Eberswalde to the Werbig connecting curve has been classified as only a branch line. The southern part of the route has continued to be classified as a main line and was upgraded to a speed of 100 km/h. At the end of the 1980s, the electrification of the line was considered. The political change in East Germany (Die Wende) and the resulting economic changes ended these considerations. In passenger transport, the two express services were initially retained. In the 1993/1994 timetable, services increased to three express trains from Eberswalde to Frankfurt, stopping at Bad Freienwalde, Wriezen, Werbig and Seelow, with two of them continuing to Dresden. Intermediate stations on the middle part of the line were each served by six pairs of passenger trains. On the outer sections services were denser. In 1994, the service was changed fundamentally. The stops in Sietzing, Dolgelin, Libbenichen, Carzig and Schönfließ Dorf were closed and trains ran over the whole route stopping at the remaining stations every two hours. The trains to Kustrin stopped in Booßen and Frankfurt-Klingethal until 1996.

After 2000, the services to Eberswalde continued to Berlin. The trains ran every hour to Wriezen and every two hours continued to Frankfurt. On the one hand, the former operator, Deutsche Bahn, hoped this would increase passenger numbers, and on the other, this measure was necessary because the direct connection with Berlin via Wriezen on the Wriezen Railway had been closed in 1998. The Regionalbahn service RB 60 was extended to Berlin-Lichtenberg in the meantime as Regional-Express service RE 7, but this was abandoned after a year.

At the timetable change on 12 December 2004, Ostdeutsche Eisenbahn took over the operation of passenger services on the line. For marketing reasons, the service was known as OE 60. Since the timetable change on 9 December 2012, the line has been operated as RB60.

At the timetable change on 14 December 2014 the Niederbarnimer Eisenbahn took over the operation of passengers services on the route, using Stadler Regio-Shuttle RS1 DMUs. Trains run, every hour on weekdays and every two hours on weekends between Eberswalde and Wriezen.
