= Neuhardenberg (Amt) =

German municipality

Coordinates: 52.592306°N 14.266667°E

Amt Neuhardenberg is a former Amt ("collective municipality") in the district of Märkisch-Oderland, in Brandenburg, Germany. It was disbanded in January 2022. Its seat was in Neuhardenberg.

The Amt Neuhardenberg consisted of the following municipalities:

1. Gusow-Platkow
2. Märkische Höhe
3. Neuhardenberg

== Demography ==
Development of Population since 1875 within the final boundaries (Blue Line: Population; Dotted Line: Comparison to Population Development of Brandenburg state; Grey Background: Time of Nazi rule; Red Background: Time of Communist rule)

Final Population Development and Projections (Population Development before Census 2011 (blue line); Recent Population Development according to the Census in Germany in 2011 (blue bordered line); Official projections for 2005-2030 (yellow line); for 2017-2030 (scarlet line); for 2020-2030 (green line)

Amt Neuhardenberg: Population development
within the final boundaries (2021)

Year	Pop.	±% p.a.
1875	7,789	—
1890	7,099	−0.62%
1910	6,066	−0.78%
1925	6,097	+0.03%
1939	5,606	−0.60%
1950	7,038	+2.09%
1964	6,129	−0.98%
1971	6,836	+1.57%

Year	Pop.	±% p.a.
1981	6,795	−0.06%
1985	7,020	+0.82%
1990	6,887	−0.38%
1995	6,288	−1.80%
2000	5,314	−3.31%
2005	4,996	−1.23%
2010	4,550	−1.85%
2015	4,513	−0.16%

Year	Pop.	±% p.a.
2016	4,431	−1.82%
2017	4,510	+1.78%
2018	4,571	+1.35%
2019	4,688	+2.56%
2020	4,752	+1.37%
2021	4,753	+0.02%
