= Astrid Gräfin von Hardenberg =

Astrid Gräfin von Hardenberg (5 May 1925 – 4 February 2015) was the daughter of the opponent to the national socialist regime, Carl-Hans Graf von Hardenberg, and of Renate von der Schulenburg.

Born in Potsdam, von Hardenberg started studying in 1942 at the Berlin State School but was forced to interrupt her studies in 1943, in order to work as Red Cross nurse in different hospitals, among which the military hospital in Rosenheim. In July 1944 the family mansion was confiscated because of the family's involvement in the 20 July plot against Hitler. She worked till 1990 for the European Commission in Brussels.

After the German reunification, Friedrich Karl Graf von Hardenberg requested the restitution of the family property as Carl-Hans von Hardenberg's son and legal heir. Because of his old age, he bequeathed the property to his sister Astrid and his nephew Gebhard. The request was approved in 1993 and the von Hardenberg family took possession of the estate in Neuhardenberg in 1996.

The mansion and the park were sold to the Deutscher Sparkassen- und Giroverband which started the restoration the following year. The mansion's park was redesigned and the memorial for Frederick II of Prussia was also rehabilitated. The new owner developed the mansion as an international cultural center and created the "Schloss Neuhardenberg Foundation". The von Hardenberg family kept the Lietzen commandry (Komturei) and the Neuhardenberg estate.

In 1998, Astrid von Hardenberg created the Carl-Hans von Hardenberg Foundation in memory of her father. The foundation promotes the education of young people from the Märkisch-Oderland Kreis (district) and from the neighboring areas, including those beyond the German-Polish border. It also promotes social involvement and creativity of young people. The foundation emphasizes Christian orientation of youth activities and cross-border exchanges of young people.

Astrid von Hardenberg was chairperson of the foundation and her niece, Amelie, is a member of the board of curators.

In 2001, the "Rosen Tantau" [Rosarium] named a rose cultivar in her honor. It received the gold medal at the International Rose Competition in Rome, 2002.

== Death ==
Astrid von Hardenberg died in Berlin on 4 February 2015, aged 89.
