= Herrensee station =

Railway station in Rehfelde, Germany

Herrensee
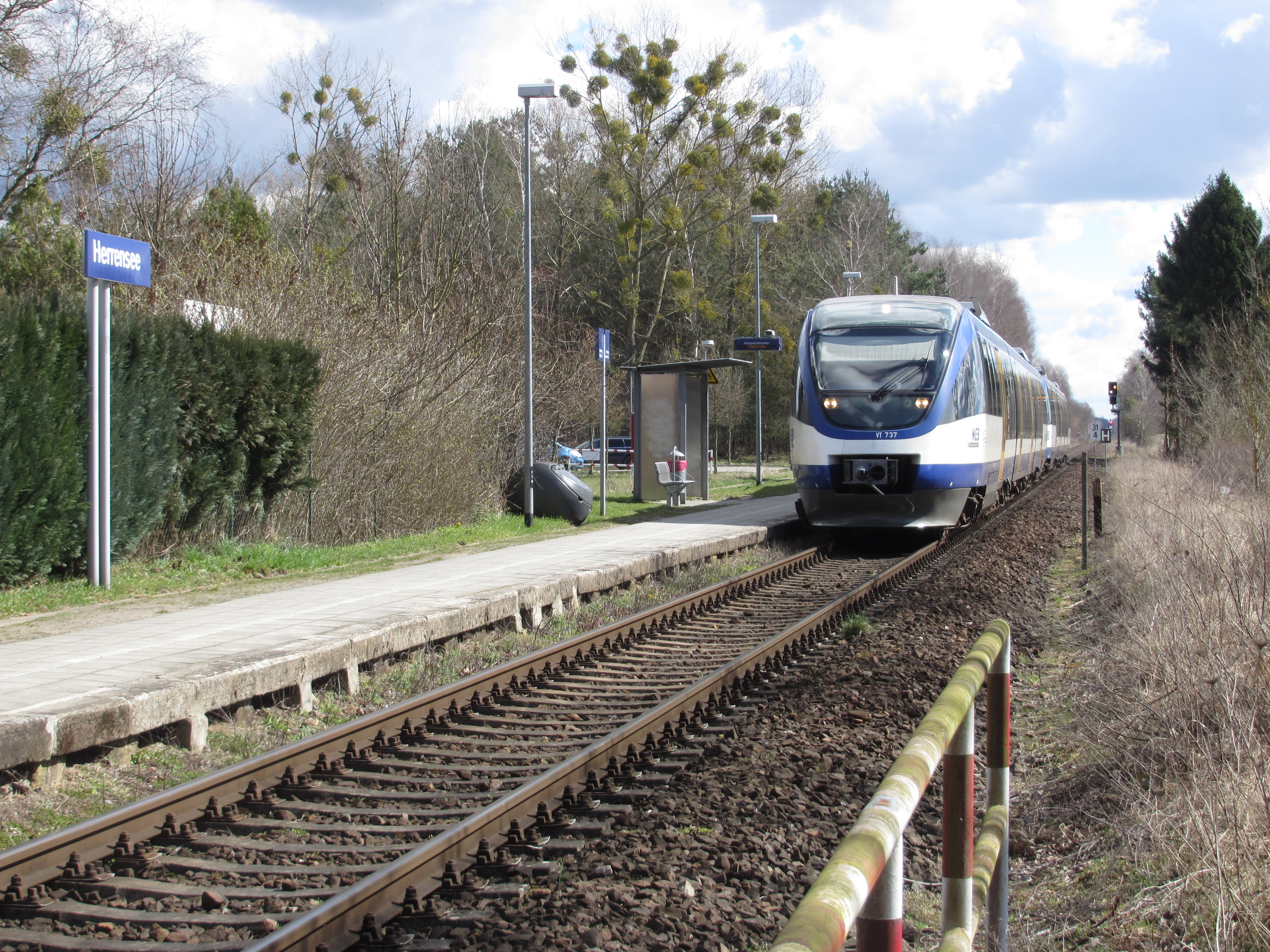
- 2015

General information
- Location: Ernst-Thälmann-Straße; 15345 Rehfelde OT Herrensee; Brandenburg; Germany
- Coordinates: 52.5299°N 13.8875°E
- Owner: DB Netz
- Operator: DB Station&Service
- Line: Prussian Eastern Railway
- Platforms: 2
- Tracks: 2
- Train operators: Niederbarnimer Eisenbahn

Other information
- Station code: 2727
- DS100 code: BHE
- IBNR: 8011863
- Category: 6
- Fare zone: VBB: 5563
- Website: www.bahnhof.de

Services
Preceding station	Niederbarnimer Eisenbahn	Following station
Strausberg towards Berlin Ostkreuz	RB 26	Rehfelde towards Kostrzyn
Location
- Location within Brandenburg

Herrensee station is a railway station in the village of Herrensee in the municipality of Rehfelde in the Märkisch-Oderland district of Brandenburg, Germany. It is served by the line RB 26.
