= Seelow-Land =

- Amt
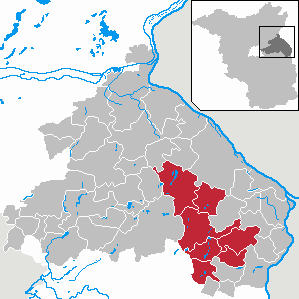
- Map of Märkisch-Oderland highlighting Seelow-Land
- Interactive map of Seelow-Land
- Location within Germany Location within Brandenburg
- Coordinates: 52°32′N 14°23′E
- Country: Germany
- State: Brandenburg
- District: Märkisch-Oderland
- Seat: Wriezen
- Subdivisions: 7 municipalities

Area
  - Total: 305.55 km^{2} (117.97 sq mi)

Population (2025-12-31)
  - Total: 8,359
  - Density: 27.36/km^{2} (70.85/sq mi)
- Time zone: UTC+01:00 (CET)
  - Summer (DST): UTC+02:00 (CEST)
- Website: www.amt-seelow-land.de

Amt Seelow-Land is an Amt ("collective municipality") in the district of Märkisch-Oderland, in Brandenburg, Germany. Its seat is in Seelow, itself not part of the Amt.

The Amt Seelow-Land consists of the following municipalities:

1. Falkenhagen
2. Fichtenhöhe
3. Gusow-Platkow
4. Lietzen
5. Lindendorf
6. Neuhardenberg
7. Vierlinden

== Demography ==
Development of Population since 1875 within the Current Boundaries (Blue Line: Population; Dotted Line: Comparison to Population Development of Brandenburg state; Grey Background: Time of Nazi rule; Red Background: Time of Communist rule)

Recent Population Development and Projections (Population Development before Census 2011 (blue line); Recent Population Development according to the Census in Germany in 2011 (blue bordered line); Official projections for 2005-2030 (yellow line); for 2017-2030 (scarlet line); for 2020-2030 (green line)

Amt Seelow-Land: Population development
within the current boundaries (2025)

| Year | Pop. | ±% p.a. |
|---|---|---|
| 1875 | 14,601 | — |
| 1890 | 13,220 | −0.66% |
| 1910 | 11,589 | −0.66% |
| 1925 | 12,469 | +0.49% |
| 1933 | 11,527 | −0.98% |
| 1939 | 10,763 | −1.14% |
| 1946 | 13,181 | +2.94% |
| 1950 | 14,873 | +3.07% |
| 1964 | 12,409 | −1.29% |
| 1971 | 12,637 | +0.26% |

| Year | Pop. | ±% p.a. |
|---|---|---|
| 1981 | 11,708 | −0.76% |
| 1985 | 11,793 | +0.18% |
| 1990 | 11,436 | −0.61% |
| 1995 | 11,151 | −0.50% |
| 2000 | 10,048 | −2.06% |
| 2005 | 9,676 | −0.75% |
| 2010 | 8,922 | −1.61% |
| 2015 | 8,825 | −0.22% |
| 2020 | 8,763 | −0.14% |
| 2025 | 8,359 | −0.94% |
