= Rehfelde station =

Railway station in Rehfelde, Germany

Rehfelde
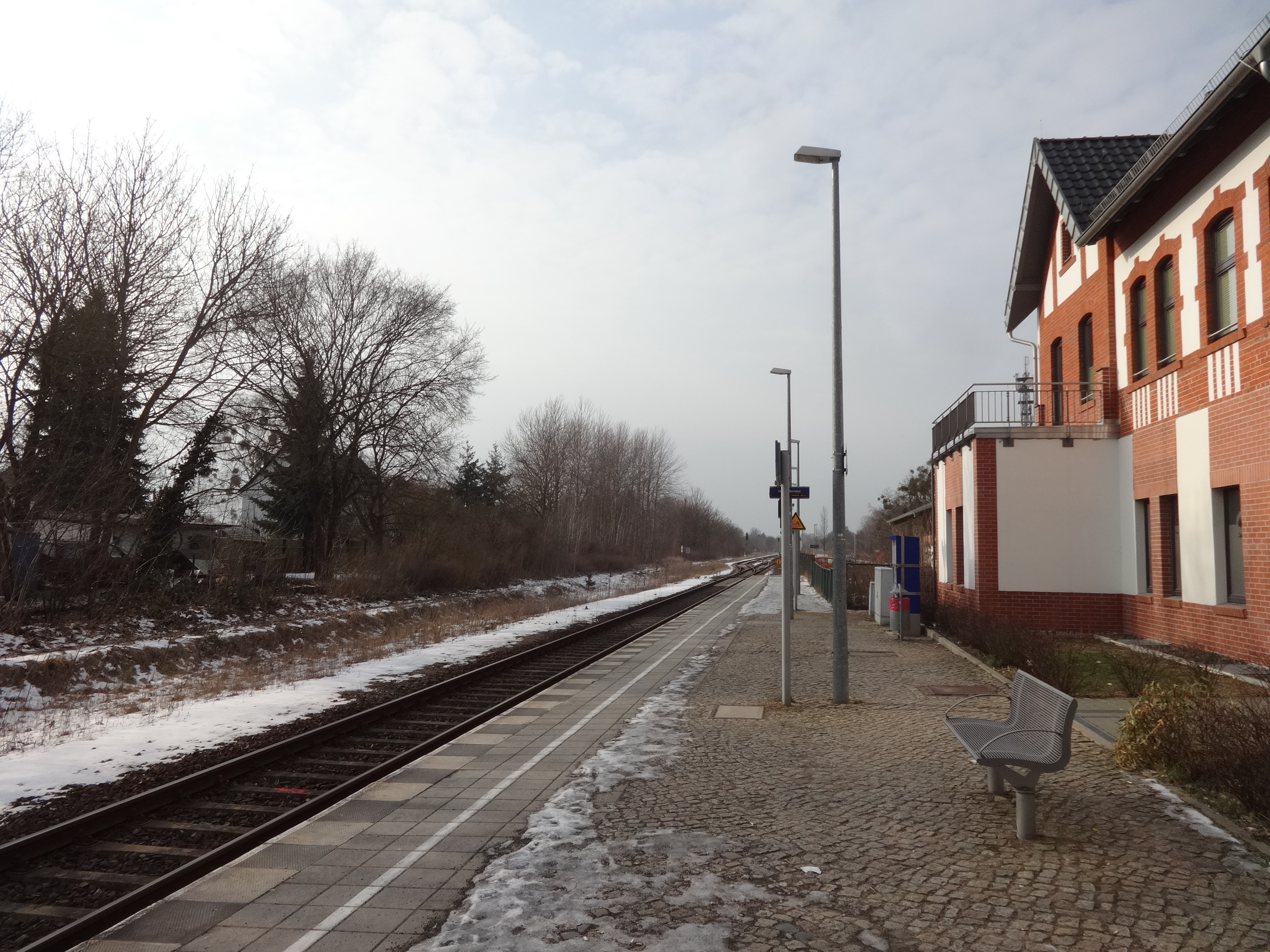
- 2017

General information
- Location: Bahnhofstraße 23a 15345 Rehfelde; Brandenburg; Germany
- Coordinates: 52.5286°N 13.9227°E
- Owner: DB Netz
- Operator: DB Station&Service
- Line: Prussian Eastern Railway
- Platforms: 1
- Tracks: 1
- Train operators: Niederbarnimer Eisenbahn

Other information
- Station code: 5178
- DS100 code: BRE
- IBNR: 8012735
- Category: 6
- Fare zone: VBB: 5563
- Website: www.bahnhof.de

History
- Opened: 1 November 1874

Services
Preceding station	Niederbarnimer Eisenbahn	Following station
Herrensee towards Berlin Ostkreuz	RB 26	Müncheberg (Mark) towards Kostrzyn
Location
- Location within Brandenburg

Rehfelde station is a railway station in the municipality of Rehfelde in the Märkisch-Oderland district of Brandenburg. It is served by the line RB 26.
