= Carl-Hans von Hardenberg =

German politician and landowner (1891–1958)

Carl-Hans Graf von Hardenberg (October 22, 1891 – October 24, 1958) was a German politician and landowner.

== Early life and ancestry ==
Carl-Hans was born in Glogau, Silesia, Germany (now Głogów, Poland), as the second child and only son of Count Wilhelm von Hardenberg (1858–1915) and his wife and relative, Baroness Helene von Hardenberg (1862–1922). He was part of the nobility of Lower Saxony; the knights von Hardenberg own Hardenberg Castle at Nörten-Hardenberg since 1287 and were later created barons and, in 1778, counts (Graf). He had one sister, Baroness Helene Elisabeth Schilling von Cannstatt (1890–1969).

== Biography ==
Carl-Hans Graf von Hardenberg entered the German army. In 1914 he married Countess Renate von der Schulenburg (1888-1959). He was wounded several times during World War I. In 1921, having reached the rank of major, he gave up his military commission and settled at his castle in Neuhardenberg. Besides his farming, he was active in communal politics, engaged in administration of the district of Lebus in the province of Brandenburg, and was active in the Protestant noblemen's Order of Saint John. When the National Socialist Party came to power in 1933, Hardenberg refused to join any of the party-sponsored organizations and was removed from all his positions.

In 1939 he was called for military duty as major in the military reserve force. In 1940 he was assigned to Army Group B where he met Major General Henning von Tresckow and became involved in the resistance against Hitler. In 1942 he was transferred to Berlin where he came into contact with colonel Claus Schenk Graf von Stauffenberg and began organizing for the plot for the assassination of Hitler. Many of the meetings of the conspirators took place at the Neuhardenberg mansion, which was located at 70 km from Berlin and was not under police supervision. Had the coup d'état succeeded according to the initial plan, Hardenberg would have taken the position of prime minister of Berlin-Brandenburg.

After the failure of the coup, Hardenberg was arrested and his estate was confiscated. He tried unsuccessfully to commit suicide and was imprisoned in the Sachsenhausen concentration camp and tried for treason. The concentration camp was liberated on April 22, 1945, a day before Hardenberg was expected to be sentenced to death and executed.

After the end of World War II, Hardenberg returned with his family to Neuhardenberg. But his estate was nationalized by the Communist authorities, and he fled with his family to West-Germany and lived in Kronberg im Taunus, Hesse. He died on October 24, 1958, age 67, in Frankfurt am Main, Germany.

A foundation named Carl-Hans Graf von Hardenberg was created in 1997 by his daughter Astrid Gräfin von Hardenberg. The foundation has its headquarters in the commandry of Lietzen.
