= Oderbruch =

Region along the river Oder

Coordinates: 52°42′N 14°15′E

The Oderbruch (German pronunciation: [ˈoːdɐbʁʊx]; Polish: Kotlina Freienwaldzka) is a landscape located at the Oder river in eastern Germany on the Polish border, with a small part also in Poland. It extends from the towns Oderberg and Bad Freienwalde in the north to Lebus in the south, in the county of Märkisch-Oderland in the state of Brandenburg. The Oderbruch is about 60 km long and its width varies from 12 to 20 km for a total area of some 920 km^{2}. It is a slightly inclined plane descending from 14 m in the southeast to just one meter above sea level in the northwest. The German name Oderbruch comes from Middle High German brouch meaning a marshy ground, swamp or moor (bruch is related to the English term brook), while the Polish name refers to Bad Freienwalde.

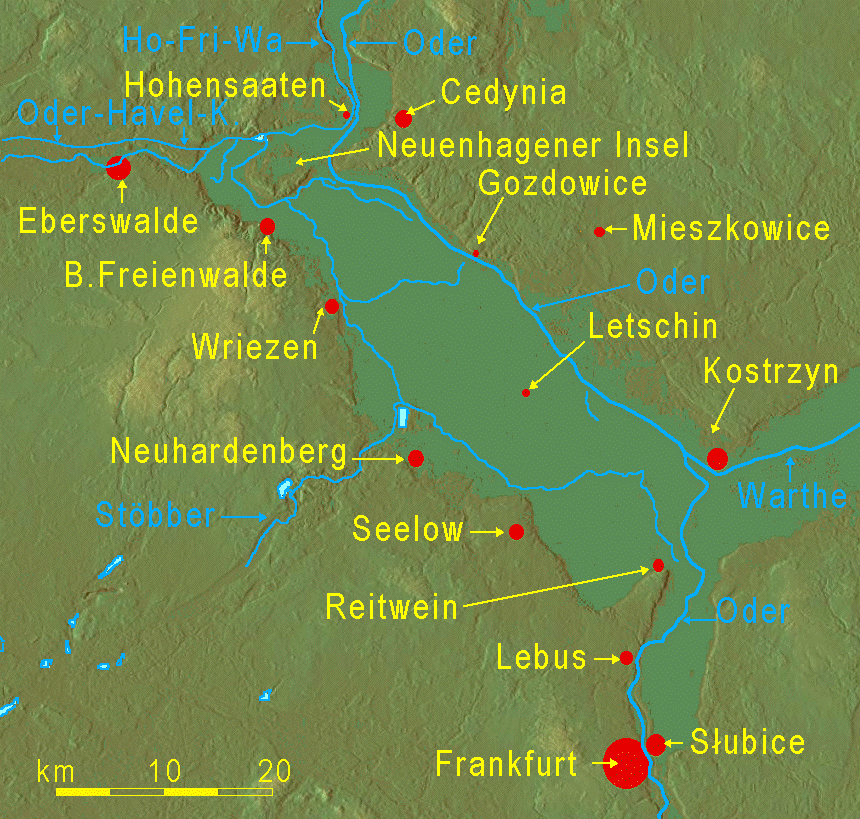
The Oderbruch, blue-green = less than 20 m above sea level

The Prussian king Frederick the Great initiated the drainage of the Oderbruch in order to bring this large tract of marshland under cultivation. Since that time the land west of the river has been river polder, whereas the 17% of the Oderbruch which is now in Poland has retained its original wetland character.

The region experienced two months of heavy fighting which devastated the area at the close of World War II when Marshal Georgy Zhukov led the 1st Belorussian Front through the Oderbruch on the way to Berlin.

== Landscape ==
Until the 18th century the Oder meandered in several arms through this low-lying area, much of which flooded several times each year, a process which regularly altered the course and importance of the various channels. Fishing was the most important occupation for the inhabitants of the few Oderbruch towns that existed at the time. Today the Oder's main channel is constrained to the eastern edge of the depression, and the remnants of the former branches bear designations like Alte Oder (“Old Oder”) or Stille Oder (“still” in the sense of motionless).

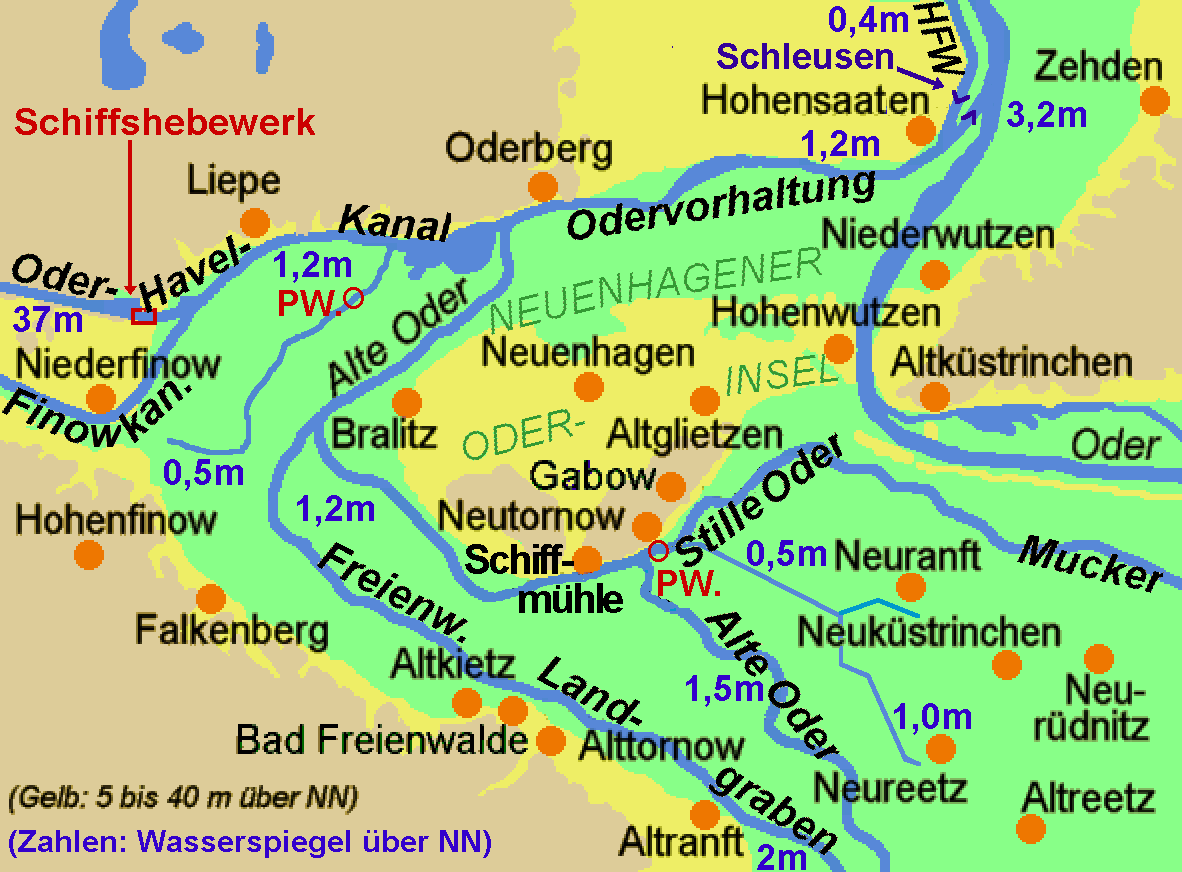
Remnants of former Oder meander beds in the northern Oderbruch showing the original names but current water levels. The main bed of the Oder is in the upper right quarter. PW = pumping stations

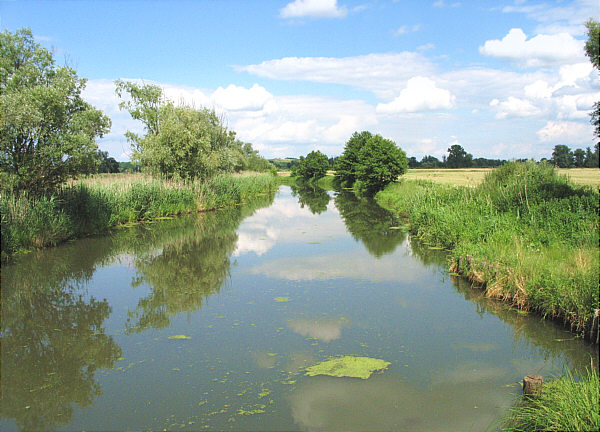
The Stille Oder south of Neuenhagener Insel

Today's Oderbruch landscape was shaped by the regulation of the river in the 18th century. The construction of embankments and drainage work began in 1735 but was primarily carried out between 1747 and 1762 under the Prussian king Frederick II. As intended, in a short time a large part of the Oderbruch was drained and could be settled. Some 130,000 morgen (32,500 ha) of fertile farmland had been obtained. In Letschin a monument was erected to honor Frederick II in gratitude for his initiative to drain the Oderbruch.

In 1895 two chain pumps were constructed at different locations to drain the area northeast of Wriezen and facilitate agricultural use of the lower Oderbruch west of the Neuhagener Insel. In the drained area the water level, including the groundwater level, is only some 1.5 meters above sea level.

In order to improve the flow of the Alte Oder, a 42 kilometer long shipping canal, the Hohensaaten-Friedrichsthaler Wasserstraß (HFW) was built on the northeast border of the Oderbruch on the Oder lowlands downriver from Hohensaaten.

The Kietzer See at the southern border of the Oderbruch near the village of Altfriedland is the central water body of the European bird sanctuary Altfriedländer Teich- und Seengebiet, an autumn rest stop for up to 30,000 migrating birds, especially the bean goose and the greater white-fronted goose.

A former railroad track from Wriezen to Neurüdnitz has been resurfaced for bikers. Also popular are the bike routes parallel to or directly along the Oder dike, for example the Oder-Neiße cycle track.

=== Flooding ===
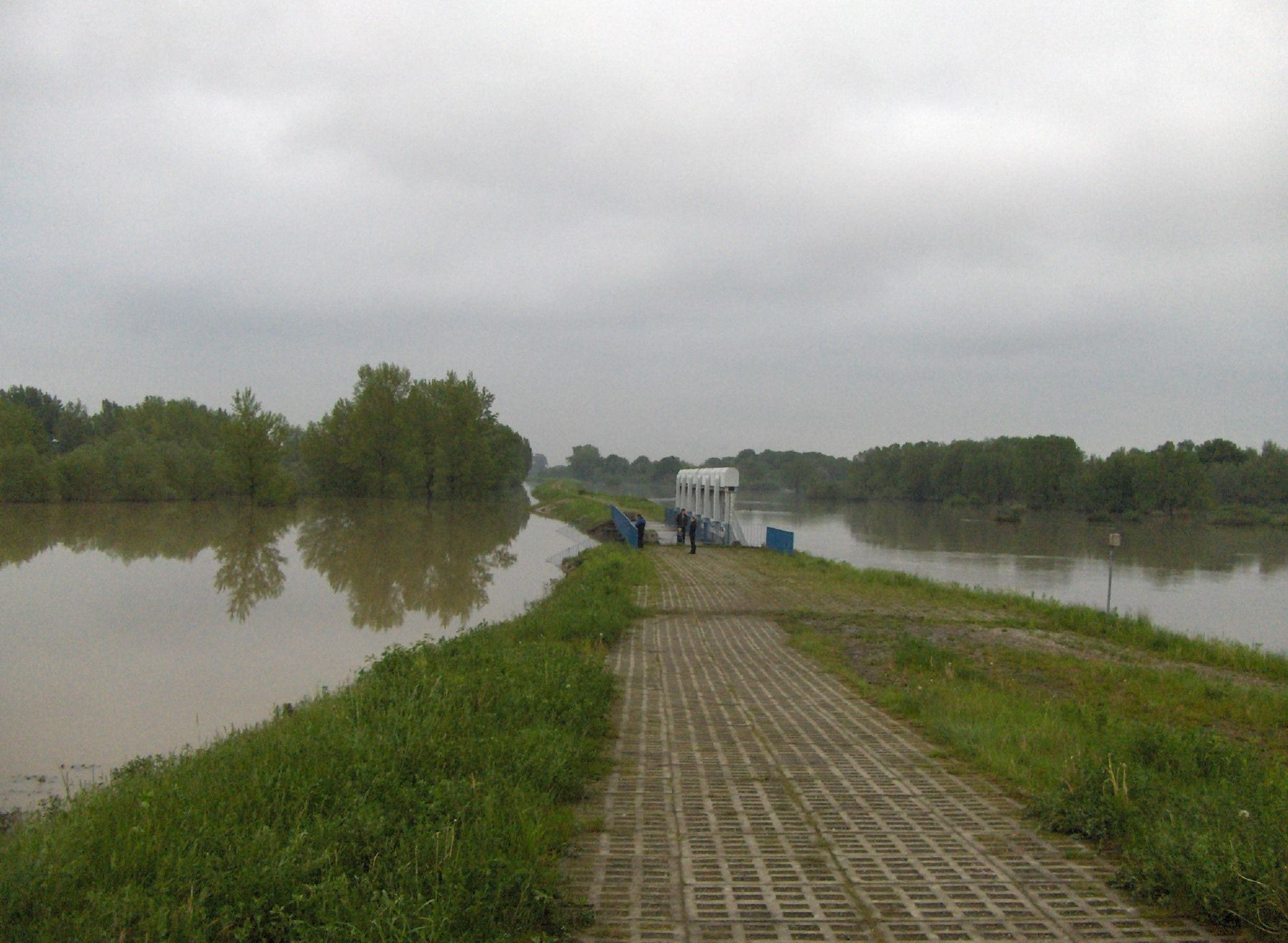
The flooded Buków polder on 19 May 2010 (the Oder river is at right)

Regulations dating from 1717 as well as the construction of canals, dikes and dams have improved the flow of the Oder river and its arms through the Oderbruch. Nevertheless, the Oderbruch suffered from heavy flooding in 1785, 1838, 1947, 1981/82, 1997 and 2010.

The worst flood catastrophe of the 20th century in the Oderbruch took place in spring 1947, when over 20,000 people lost their homes. Ice floes formed a barrier at the flood control channel near Küstrin-Kietz. Within a short time huge amounts of water were dammed up and flooded the Oder dike at two locations north of Reitwein. The flood even reached Bad Freienwalde, which was located several kilometers from the river.

=== Beaver reintroduction ===
The Eurasian beaver was considered to be extinct in the Oderbruch. In 1986 the area was repopulated with 46 specimens brought in from the Elbe, and the beaver population is now reproducing and stable. A 2008 survey counted 250 individuals in 60 colonies in the Oderbruch north of Frankfurt/Oder, with the total number of animals for the entire Oderbruch estimated at far over 500 animals. These beavers have left obvious traces in the landscape in the form of cut down or gnawed trees, water flow blocked by beaver dams, sodden agricultural fields, and fields and dikes undermined by beaver lodges. Even more critical is beaver behavior at the Oder dikes if the grass cover is destroyed, allowing deep and destabilizing holes to arise. In order to reduce conflict, the Oderbruch water and dike association (Gewässer- und Deichverband Oderbruch) developed a beaver management plan in 2009 to ease tensions in the relationship between the Oderbruch inhabitants and these large rodents.

== History ==
=== Settlement ===
After the Oderbruch was drained in the 18th century, new settlers were recruited primarily from outside Prussia, with numerous privileges offered as an incentive. Systematic settlement began in 1753 in newly laid out linear villages. The procedure was to dig a drainage ditch between the two village streets, using the excavated earth to raise the building sites on which homes for the new settlers were erected. Between the two rows of houses, in the middle of the village, a church, an inn, and a schoolhouse were erected. The historic village grounds of the first settlement, Neulietzegöricke, are today a protected site containing many restored half-timbered houses and traces of the original village layout.

=== World War II ===
Near the end of World War II, in spring 1945, the entire Oderbruch was heavily damaged in connection with the largest battle of the war on German territory. The Red Army crossed the Oder River at Kienitz (Now part of Letschin) and established a 300 square kilometer bridgehead before commencing the Battle of the Seelow Heights at the western border of the Oderbruch. Innumerable fields were destroyed and villages reduced to rubble, putting an end to the livelihood of large parts of the population. The Oderbruch is still plagued with the legacy of the war in the form of hazardous military waste which becomes ever more dangerous as the vast amounts of remaining buried bombs, grenades, rockets and infantry shells continue to corrode.

The Red Army assault, the Battle of the Seelow Heights and the consequences for the Oderbruch are presented in German and English at the Gedenkstätte Seelower Höhen in the town of Seelow.

== Sources and references ==
This article incorporates information from the equivalent articles "Oderbruch" and "Letschin" in the German Wikipedia.
