= Oberbarnim =

- Municipality
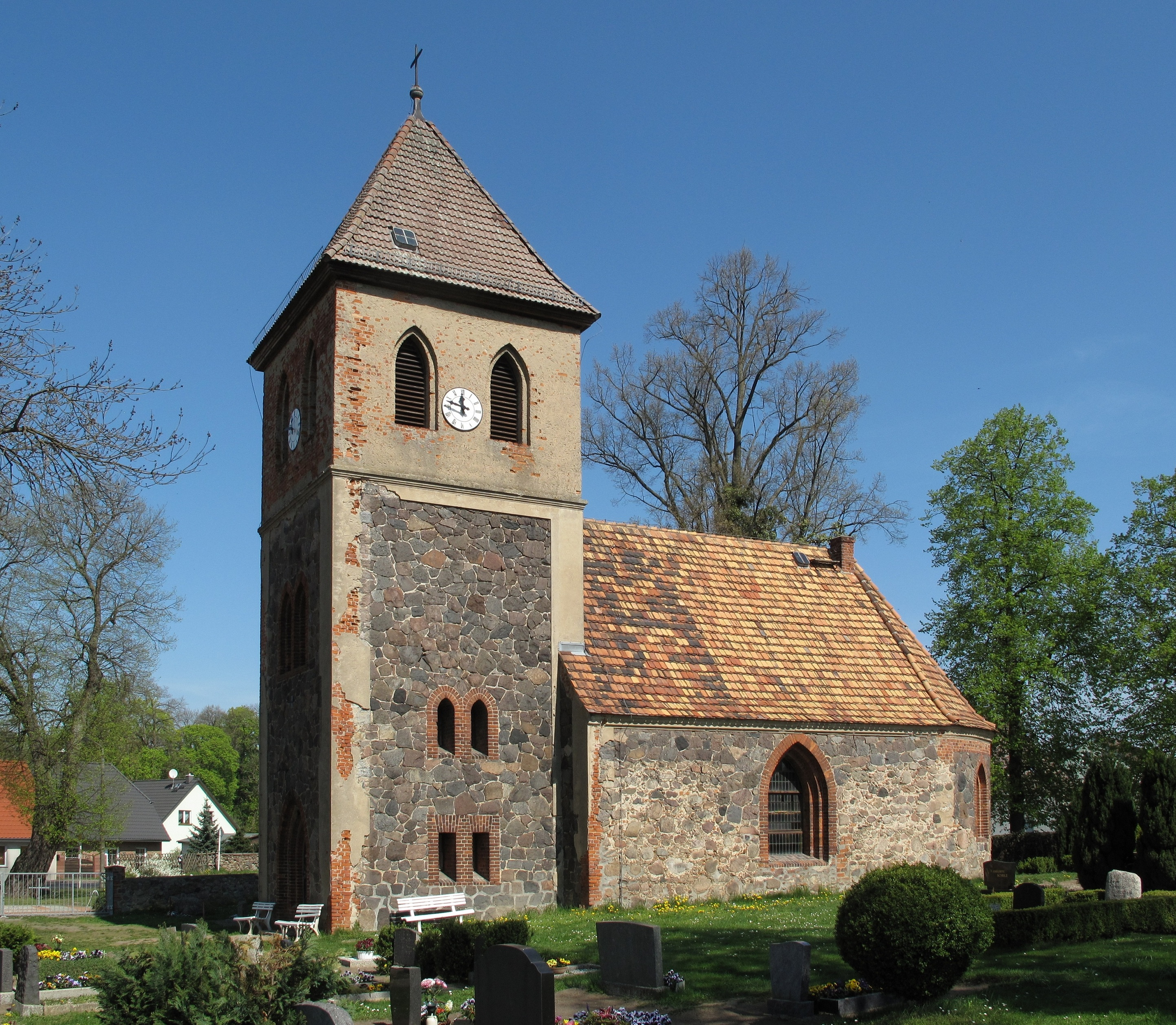
- Church in Bollersdorf village

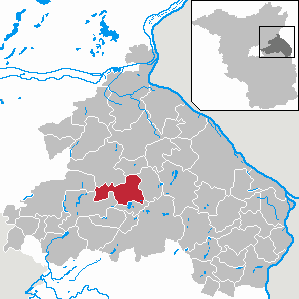
- Location of Oberbarnim within Märkisch-Oderland district
- Interactive map of Oberbarnim
- Location within Germany Location within Brandenburg
- Coordinates: 52°35′38″N 14°2′8″E
- Country: Germany
- State: Brandenburg
- District: Märkisch-Oderland
- Municipal assoc.: Märkische Schweiz

Government
  - Mayor (2024–29): Detlef Daubitz

Area
  - Total: 52.57 km^{2} (20.30 sq mi)
- Elevation: 95 m (312 ft)

Population (2025-12-31)
  - Total: 2,081
  - Density: 39.59/km^{2} (102.5/sq mi)
- Time zone: UTC+01:00 (CET)
  - Summer (DST): UTC+02:00 (CEST)
- Postal codes: 15377, 15345
- Dialling codes: 033433, 03341, 033436, 033437
- Vehicle registration: MOL

Oberbarnim is a municipality in the district Märkisch-Oderland, in Brandenburg, Germany.

The municipality is situated largely in the Märkische Schweiz Nature Park and consists of the following quarters (German: Ortsteile):

- Bollersdorf
- Pritzhagen (with Tornow)
- Grunow (with Ernsthof)
- Klosterdorf
- Ihlow.

== Demography ==
Development of population since 1875 within the current boundaries (Blue line: Population; Dotted line: Comparison to population development of Brandenburg state; Grey background: Time of Nazi rule; Red background: Time of communist rule)

Oberbarnim: Population development
within the current boundaries (2013)

Year	Pop.	±% p.a.
1875	1,389	—
1890	1,329	−0.29%
1910	1,263	−0.25%
1925	1,507	+1.18%
1933	1,350	−1.37%
1939	1,458	+1.29%
1946	1,757	+2.70%
1950	2,080	+4.31%
1964	1,713	−1.38%
1971	1,555	−1.37%
1981	1,516	−0.25%
1985	1,498	−0.30%
1989	1,470	−0.47%
1990	1,451	−1.29%
1991	1,454	+0.21%
1992	1,422	−2.20%
1993	1,388	−2.39%
1994	1,408	+1.44%
1995	1,393	−1.07%
1996	1,408	+1.08%

Year	Pop.	±% p.a.
1997	1,418	+0.71%
1998	1,454	+2.54%
1999	1,441	−0.89%
2000	1,454	+0.90%
2001	1,454	+0.00%
2002	1,453	−0.07%
2003	1,517	+4.40%
2004	1,496	−1.38%
2005	1,496	+0.00%
2006	1,521	+1.67%
2007	1,500	−1.38%
2008	1,506	+0.40%
2009	1,465	−2.72%
2010	1,434	−2.12%
2011	1,422	−0.84%
2012	1,372	−3.52%
2013	1,386	+1.02%
2014	1,407	+1.52%
2015	1,380	−1.92%
2016	1,443	+4.57%
