= Vierlinden =

- Municipality
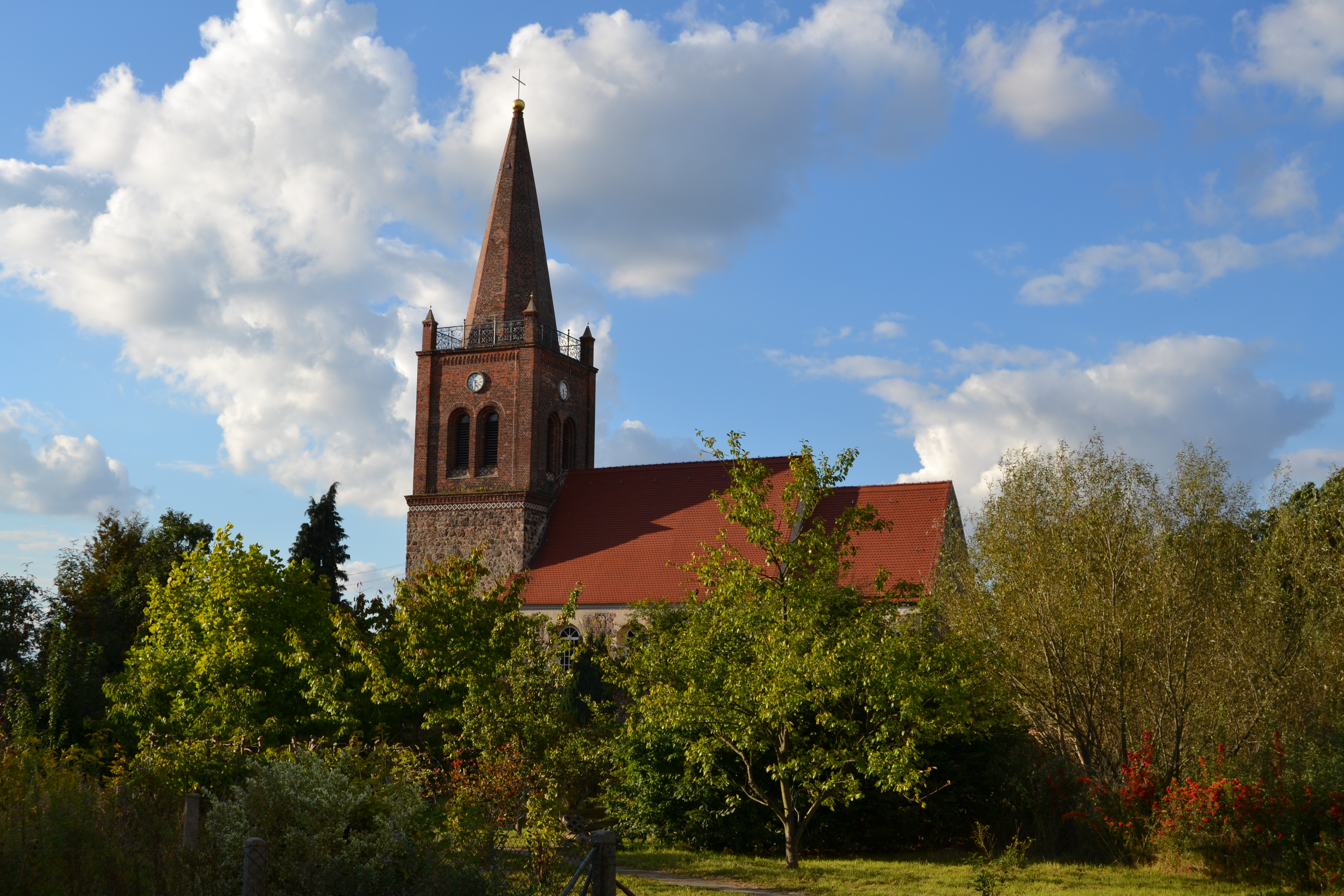
- Marxdorf village church

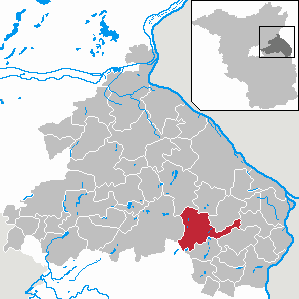
- Location of Vierlinden within Märkisch-Oderland district
- Interactive map of Vierlinden
- Location within Germany Location within Brandenburg
- Coordinates: 52°30′54″N 14°18′51″E
- Country: Germany
- State: Brandenburg
- District: Märkisch-Oderland
- Municipal assoc.: Seelow-Land
- Subdivisions: 7 Ortsteile

Government
  - Mayor (2024–29): Constantin Schütze (Ind.)

Area
  - Total: 69.45 km^{2} (26.81 sq mi)
- Elevation: 46 m (151 ft)

Population (2025-12-31)
  - Total: 1,459
  - Density: 21.01/km^{2} (54.41/sq mi)
- Time zone: UTC+01:00 (CET)
  - Summer (DST): UTC+02:00 (CEST)
- Postal codes: 15306
- Dialling codes: 03346
- Vehicle registration: MOL

Vierlinden is a municipality in the district Märkisch-Oderland, in Brandenburg, Germany.

== History ==
The municipality was created on 26 October 2003 after the merging of the municipalities of Diedersdorf, Friedersdorf, Marxdorf and Worin.

== Geography ==
Vierlinden is composed by 7 civil parishes (Ortsteile):

- Alt Rosenthal
- Diedersdorf
- Friedersdorf
- Görlsdorf
- Marxdorf
- Neuentempel
- Worin

== Demography ==
Development of Population since 1875 within the Current Boundaries (Blue Line: Population; Dotted Line: Comparison to Population Development of Brandenburg state; Grey Background: Time of Nazi rule; Red Background: Time of Communist rule)

Vierlinden: Population development
within the current boundaries (2013)

Year	Pop.	±% p.a.
1875	2,105	—
1890	2,066	−0.12%
1910	1,878	−0.48%
1925	2,105	+0.76%
1933	1,796	−1.96%
1939	1,720	−0.72%
1946	2,664	+6.45%
1950	2,885	+2.01%
1964	2,259	−1.73%
1971	2,112	−0.96%
1981	1,784	−1.67%
1985	1,704	−1.14%
1989	1,662	−0.62%
1990	1,638	−1.44%
1991	1,593	−2.75%
1992	2,328	+46.14%
1993	2,112	−9.28%
1994	2,088	−1.14%
1995	1,992	−4.60%
1996	1,735	−12.90%

Year	Pop.	±% p.a.
1997	1,774	+2.25%
1998	1,787	+0.73%
1999	1,727	−3.36%
2000	1,559	−9.73%
2001	1,566	+0.45%
2002	1,609	+2.75%
2003	1,627	+1.12%
2004	1,593	−2.09%
2005	1,621	+1.76%
2006	1,614	−0.43%
2007	1,591	−1.43%
2008	1,594	+0.19%
2009	1,555	−2.45%
2010	1,518	−2.38%
2011	1,502	−1.05%
2012	1,466	−2.40%
2013	1,463	−0.20%
2014	1,459	−0.27%
2015	1,581	+8.36%
2016	1,474	−6.77%
