= Märkische Schweiz (Amt) =

Municipality in Brandenburg, Germany

- Amt
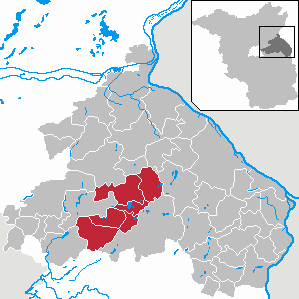
- Map of Märkisch-Oderland highlighting Märkische Schweiz
- Interactive map of Märkische Schweiz
- Location within Germany Location within Brandenburg
- Coordinates: 52°34′N 14°04′E
- Country: Germany
- State: Brandenburg
- District: Märkisch-Oderland
- Seat: Buckow
- Subdivisions: 6 municipalities

Area
  - Total: 189.58 km^{2} (73.20 sq mi)

Population (2025-12-31)
  - Total: 10,925
  - Density: 57.627/km^{2} (149.25/sq mi)
- Time zone: UTC+01:00 (CET)
  - Summer (DST): UTC+02:00 (CEST)
- Website: www.amt-maerkische-schweiz.de

Amt Märkische Schweiz (roughly, "the hill region of the March") is an Amt or collective municipality in the district of Märkisch-Oderland in the State of Brandenburg, Germany. Its seat is in Buckow.

The Amt Märkische Schweiz consists of the following municipalities:

1. Buckow
2. Garzau-Garzin
3. Oberbarnim
4. Rehfelde
5. Waldsieversdorf

== Demography ==
Development of Population since 1875 within the Current Boundaries (Blue Line: Population; Dotted Line: Comparison to Population Development of Brandenburg state; Grey Background: Time of Nazi rule; Red Background: Time of Communist rule)

Recent Population Development and Projections (Population Development before Census 2011 (blue line); Recent Population Development according to the Census in Germany in 2011 (blue bordered line); Official projections for 2005-2030 (yellow line); for 2017-2030 (scarlet line); for 2020-2030 (green line)

Amt Märkische Schweiz: Population development
within the current boundaries (2020)

Year	Pop.	±% p.a.
1875	4,943	—
1890	5,124	+0.24%
1910	5,855	+0.67%
1925	7,380	+1.56%
1939	8,362	+0.90%
1950	10,476	+2.07%
1964	9,439	−0.74%
1971	9,209	−0.35%
1981	8,471	−0.83%

Year	Pop.	±% p.a.
1985	8,172	−0.89%
1990	7,777	−0.99%
1995	7,834	+0.15%
2000	8,710	+2.14%
2005	9,522	+1.80%
2010	9,101	−0.90%
2015	9,214	+0.25%
2020	9,811	+1.26%
2025	10,925	+2.17%
