= Märkische Höhe =

- Municipality
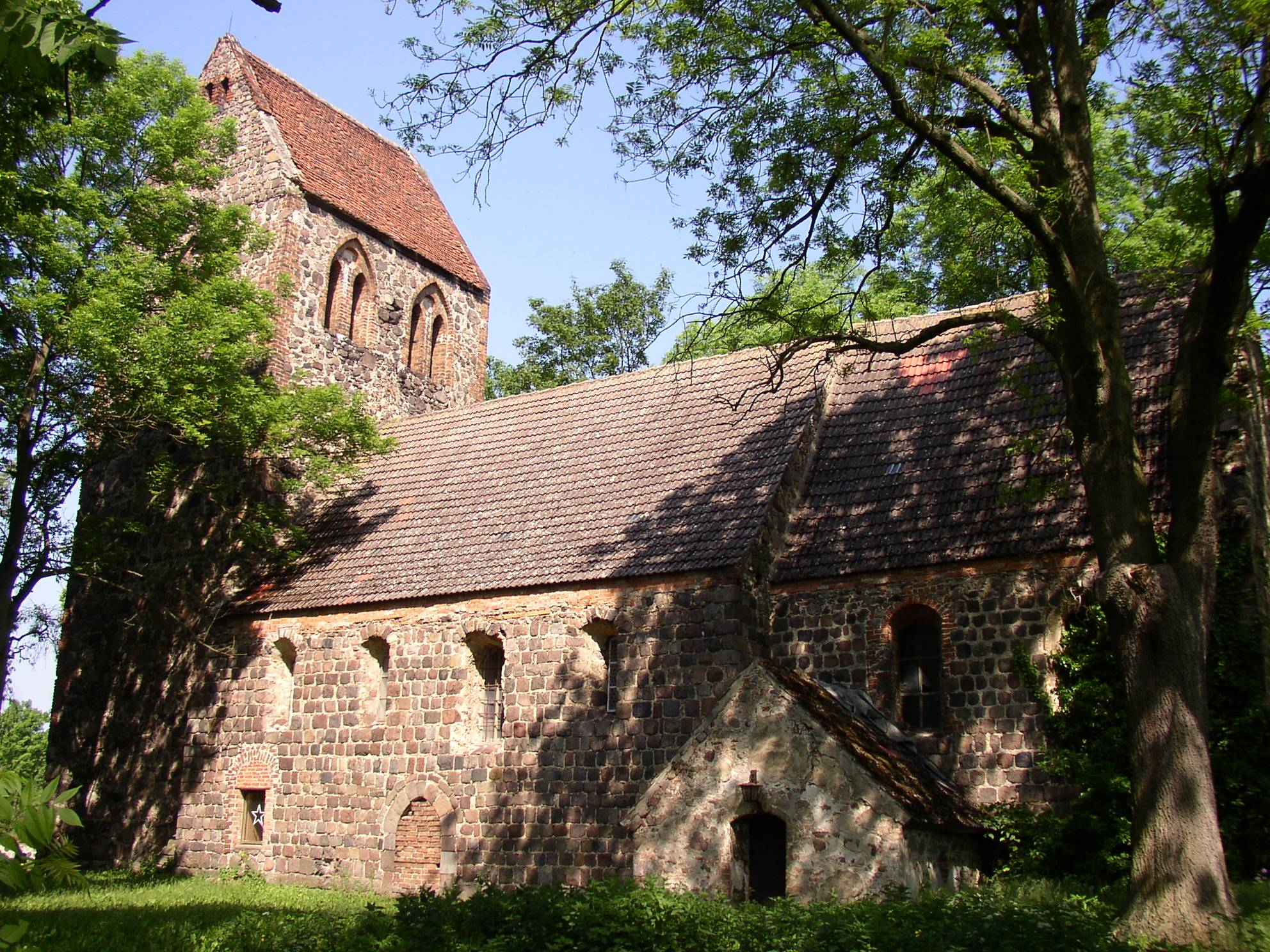
- Church

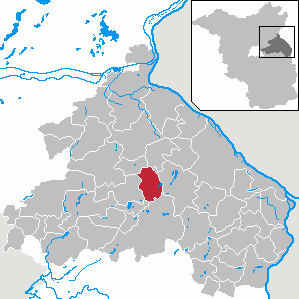
- Location of Märkische Höhe within Märkisch-Oderland district
- Interactive map of Märkische Höhe
- Location within Germany Location within Brandenburg
- Coordinates: 52°37′30″N 14°07′30″E
- Country: Germany
- State: Brandenburg
- District: Märkisch-Oderland
- Municipal assoc.: Märkische Schweiz
- Subdivisions: 3 Ortsteile

Government
  - Mayor (2024–29): Käte Roos

Area
  - Total: 34.27 km^{2} (13.23 sq mi)
- Elevation: 46 m (151 ft)

Population (2025-12-31)
  - Total: 601
  - Density: 17.5/km^{2} (45.4/sq mi)
- Time zone: UTC+01:00 (CET)
  - Summer (DST): UTC+02:00 (CEST)
- Postal codes: 15377
- Dialling codes: 033437
- Vehicle registration: MOL

Märkische Höhe is a municipality in the district Märkisch-Oderland, in Brandenburg, Germany.

== Demography ==
Development of population since 1875 within the current boundaries (Blue line: Population; Dotted line: Comparison to population development of Brandenburg state; Grey background: Time of Nazi rule; Red background: Time of communist rule)

Märkische Höhe: Population development
within the current boundaries (2013)

Year	Pop.	±% p.a.
1875	883	—
1890	786	−0.77%
1910	744	−0.27%
1925	839	+0.80%
1933	907	+0.98%
1939	831	−1.45%
1946	973	+2.28%
1950	1,040	+1.68%
1964	858	−1.36%
1971	964	+1.68%
1981	805	−1.79%
1985	745	−1.92%
1989	733	−0.41%
1990	722	−1.50%
1991	715	−0.97%
1992	709	−0.84%
1993	701	−1.13%
1994	679	−3.14%
1995	685	+0.88%
1996	669	−2.34%

Year	Pop.	±% p.a.
1997	686	+2.54%
1998	700	+2.04%
1999	690	−1.43%
2000	695	+0.72%
2001	707	+1.73%
2002	692	−2.12%
2003	684	−1.16%
2004	672	−1.75%
2005	666	−0.89%
2006	666	+0.00%
2007	646	−3.00%
2008	621	−3.87%
2009	603	−2.90%
2010	596	−1.16%
2011	590	−1.01%
2012	590	+0.00%
2013	594	+0.68%
2014	582	−2.02%
2015	576	−1.03%
2016	571	−0.87%
