= Lindendorf =

- Municipality
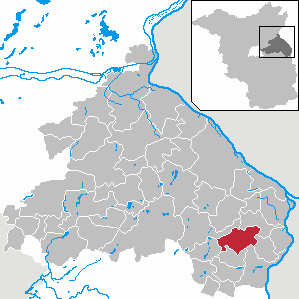
- Location of Lindendorf within Märkisch-Oderland district
- Interactive map of Lindendorf
- Location within Germany Location within Brandenburg
- Coordinates: 52°29′N 14°26′E
- Country: Germany
- State: Brandenburg
- District: Märkisch-Oderland
- Municipal assoc.: Seelow-Land
- Subdivisions: 4 Ortsteile

Government
  - Mayor (2024–29): Helmut Franz

Area
  - Total: 40.13 km^{2} (15.49 sq mi)
- Elevation: 44 m (144 ft)

Population (2025-12-31)
  - Total: 1,345
  - Density: 33.52/km^{2} (86.81/sq mi)
- Time zone: UTC+01:00 (CET)
  - Summer (DST): UTC+02:00 (CEST)
- Postal codes: 15306
- Dialling codes: 033601
- Vehicle registration: MOL

Lindendorf is a municipality in the district of Märkisch-Oderland, in Brandenburg, Germany.

== Demography ==
Development of population since 1875 within the current boundaries (Blue line: Population; Dotted line: Comparison to population development of Brandenburg state; Grey background: Time of Nazi rule; Red background: Time of Communist rule)

Lindendorf: Population development
within the current boundaries (2013)

Year	Pop.	±% p.a.
1875	3,061	—
1890	2,647	−0.96%
1910	2,256	−0.80%
1925	2,452	+0.56%
1933	2,210	−1.29%
1939	2,020	−1.49%
1946	2,165	+1.00%
1950	2,797	+6.61%
1964	2,211	−1.67%
1971	2,059	−1.01%
1981	1,691	−1.95%
1985	1,607	−1.27%
1989	1,492	−1.84%
1990	1,462	−2.01%
1991	1,434	−1.92%
1992	1,445	+0.77%
1993	1,430	−1.04%
1994	1,438	+0.56%
1995	1,458	+1.39%
1996	1,485	+1.85%

Year	Pop.	±% p.a.
1997	1,504	+1.28%
1998	1,539	+2.33%
1999	1,622	+5.39%
2000	1,647	+1.54%
2001	1,610	−2.25%
2002	1,616	+0.37%
2003	1,603	−0.80%
2004	1,577	−1.62%
2005	1,560	−1.08%
2006	1,539	−1.35%
2007	1,517	−1.43%
2008	1,505	−0.79%
2009	1,483	−1.46%
2010	1,459	−1.62%
2011	1,418	−2.81%
2012	1,408	−0.71%
2013	1,406	−0.14%
2014	1,368	−2.70%
2015	1,354	−1.02%
2016	1,347	−0.52%
