= Letschin =

- Municipality
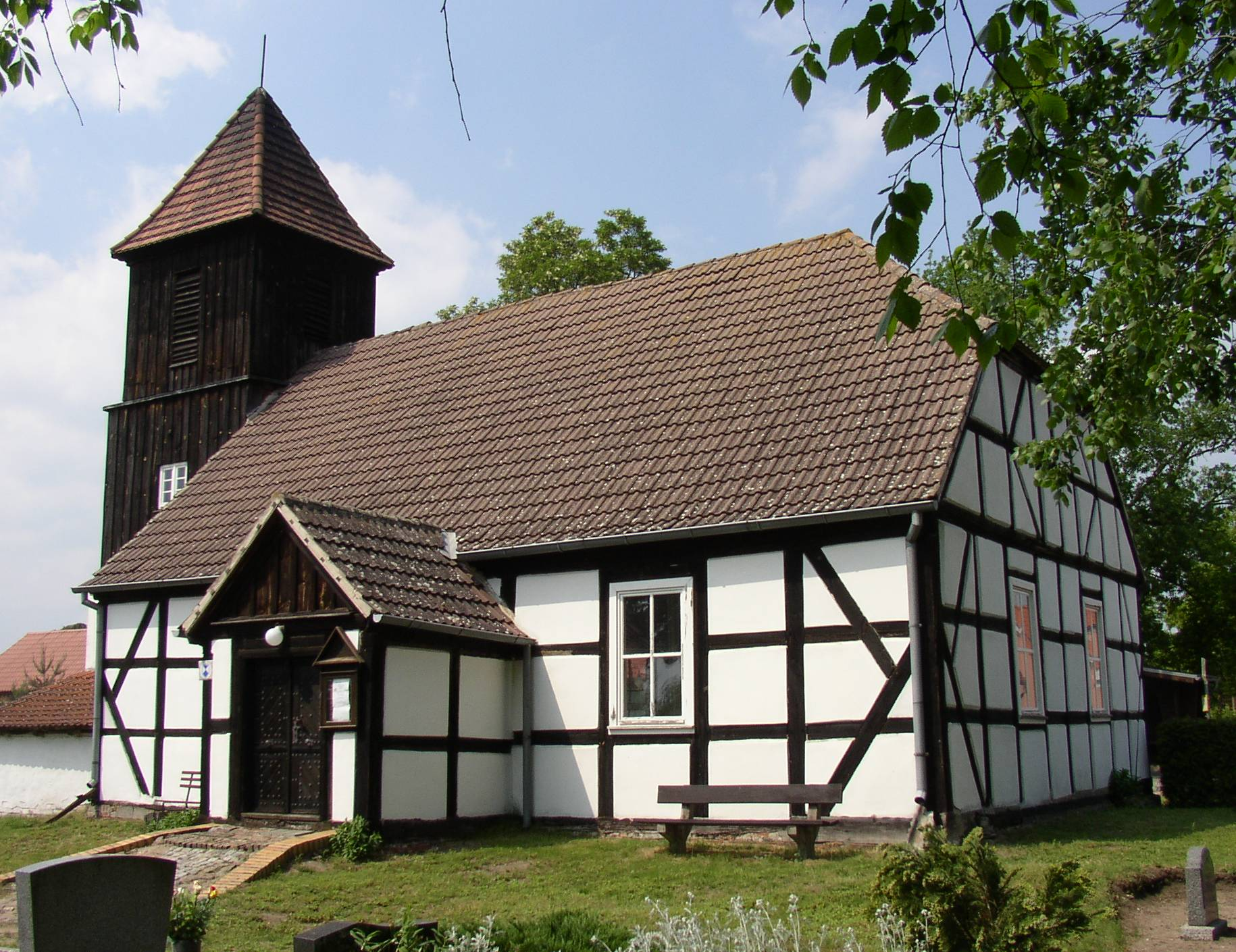
- Wooden church of Sietzing

- Coat of arms

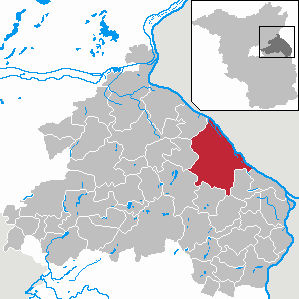
- Location of Letschin within Märkisch-Oderland district
- Interactive map of Letschin
- Location within Germany Location within Brandenburg
- Coordinates: 52°37′59″N 14°22′00″E
- Country: Germany
- State: Brandenburg
- District: Märkisch-Oderland
- Subdivisions: 10 Ortsteile

Government
  - Mayor (2021–29): Michael Böttcher

Area
  - Total: 141.28 km^{2} (54.55 sq mi)
- Elevation: 8 m (26 ft)

Population (2025-12-31)
  - Total: 3,713
  - Density: 26.28/km^{2} (68.07/sq mi)
- Time zone: UTC+01:00 (CET)
  - Summer (DST): UTC+02:00 (CEST)
- Postal codes: 15324
- Dialling codes: 033475
- Vehicle registration: MOL
- Website: www.letschin.de

Letschin is a municipality in the district of Märkisch-Oderland, in Brandenburg, Germany.

The municipality has ten subdivisions:

- Gieshof-Zelliner Loose
- Gross Neuendorf
- Kiehnwerder
- Kienitz
- Letschin
- Neubarnim
- Ortwig
- Sietzing
- Sophienthal
- Steintoch

== Demography ==
Development of Population since 1875 within the Current Boundaries (Blue Line: Population; Dotted Line: Comparison to Population Development of Brandenburg state; Grey Background: Time of Nazi rule; Red Background: Time of Communist rule)

Recent Population Development and Projections (Population Development before Census 2011 (blue line); Recent Population Development according to the Census in Germany in 2011 (blue bordered line); Official projections for 2005-2030 (yellow line); for 2017-2030 (scarlet line); for 2020-2030 (green line)

Letschin: Population development
within the current boundaries (2020)

Year	Pop.	±% p.a.
1875	13,357	—
1890	11,550	−0.96%
1910	10,551	−0.45%
1925	10,413	−0.09%
1939	9,470	−0.68%
1950	10,311	+0.78%
1964	8,299	−1.54%

Year	Pop.	±% p.a.
1971	7,883	−0.73%
1981	6,480	−1.94%
1985	6,275	−0.80%
1990	6,133	−0.46%
1995	5,588	−1.84%
2000	5,332	−0.93%
2005	4,785	−2.14%

Year	Pop.	±% p.a.
2010	4,329	−1.98%
2015	4,035	−1.40%
2016	4,003	−0.79%
2017	3,967	−0.90%
2018	3,987	+0.50%
2019	3,975	−0.30%
2020	3,978	+0.08%

== People ==
- Katja Havemann (born 1947), civil right activists and author
