= Gusow-Platkow =

Municipality in Brandenburg, Germany

- Municipality
- Coat of arms

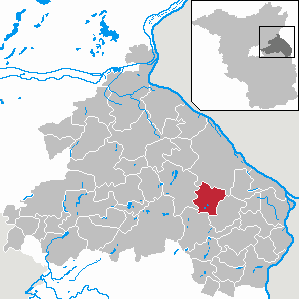
- Location of Gusow-Platkow within Märkisch-Oderland district
- Interactive map of Gusow-Platkow
- Location within Germany Location within Brandenburg
- Coordinates: 52°34′00″N 14°20′59″E
- Country: Germany
- State: Brandenburg
- District: Märkisch-Oderland
- Municipal assoc.: Seelow-Land

Government
  - Mayor (2024–29): Frank Kraft (Ind.)

Area
  - Total: 37.88 km^{2} (14.63 sq mi)
- Elevation: 12 m (39 ft)

Population (2025-12-31)
  - Total: 1,206
  - Density: 31.84/km^{2} (82.46/sq mi)
- Time zone: UTC+01:00 (CET)
  - Summer (DST): UTC+02:00 (CEST)
- Postal codes: 15306
- Dialling codes: 03346
- Vehicle registration: MOL

Gusow-Platkow is a municipality in the district Märkisch-Oderland, in Brandenburg, Germany.

== Demography ==
Development of population since 1875 within the current boundaries (Blue line: Population; Dotted line: Comparison to population development of Brandenburg state; Grey background: Time of Nazi rule; Red background: Time of communist rule)

Gusow-Platkow: Population development
within the current boundaries (2013)

Year	Pop.	±% p.a.
1875	3,389	—
1890	3,063	−0.67%
1910	2,694	−0.64%
1925	2,525	−0.43%
1933	2,533	+0.04%
1939	2,320	−1.45%
1946	2,526	+1.22%
1950	2,819	+2.78%
1964	2,168	−1.86%
1971	2,073	−0.64%
1981	1,741	−1.73%
1985	1,688	−0.77%
1989	1,647	−0.61%
1990	1,610	−2.25%
1991	1,568	−2.61%
1992	1,531	−2.36%
1993	1,496	−2.29%
1994	1,474	−1.47%
1995	1,460	−0.95%
1996	1,452	−0.55%

Year	Pop.	±% p.a.
1997	1,427	−1.72%
1998	1,459	+2.24%
1999	1,441	−1.23%
2000	1,416	−1.73%
2001	1,438	+1.55%
2002	1,418	−1.39%
2003	1,417	−0.07%
2004	1,421	+0.28%
2005	1,406	−1.06%
2006	1,384	−1.56%
2007	1,387	+0.22%
2008	1,356	−2.24%
2009	1,307	−3.61%
2010	1,282	−1.91%
2011	1,233	−3.82%
2012	1,230	−0.24%
2013	1,202	−2.28%
2014	1,193	−0.75%
2015	1,222	+2.43%
2016	1,243	+1.72%
