= Fichtenhöhe =

- Municipality
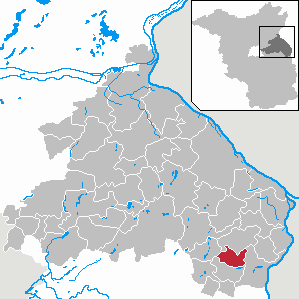
- Location of Fichtenhöhe within Märkisch-Oderland district
- Interactive map of Fichtenhöhe
- Location within Germany Location within Brandenburg
- Coordinates: 52°27′00″N 14°25′59″E
- Country: Germany
- State: Brandenburg
- District: Märkisch-Oderland
- Municipal assoc.: Seelow-Land
- Subdivisions: 3 Ortsteile

Government
  - Mayor (2024–29): Jörg Henschke

Area
  - Total: 22.89 km^{2} (8.84 sq mi)
- Elevation: 55 m (180 ft)

Population (2025-12-31)
  - Total: 468
  - Density: 20.4/km^{2} (53.0/sq mi)
- Time zone: UTC+01:00 (CET)
  - Summer (DST): UTC+02:00 (CEST)
- Postal codes: 15306
- Dialling codes: 033602
- Vehicle registration: MOL
- Website: amt-seelow-land.de

Fichtenhöhe is a municipality in the district of Märkisch-Oderland in Brandenburg, Germany.

== Demography ==
Development of population since 1875 within the current boundaries (Blue line: Population; Dotted line: Comparison to population development of Brandenburg state; Grey background: Time of Nazi rule; Red background: Time of communist rule)

Fichtenhöhe: Population development
within the current boundaries (2013)

Year	Pop.	±% p.a.
1875	665	—
1890	660	−0.05%
1910	576	−0.68%
1925	813	+2.32%
1933	796	−0.26%
1939	727	−1.50%
1946	768	+0.79%
1950	855	+2.72%
1964	691	−1.51%
1971	720	+0.59%
1981	555	−2.57%
1985	529	−1.19%
1989	529	+0.00%
1990	524	−0.95%
1991	492	−6.11%
1992	496	+0.81%
1993	492	−0.81%
1994	513	+4.27%
1995	518	+0.97%
1996	536	+3.47%

Year	Pop.	±% p.a.
1997	539	+0.56%
1998	570	+5.75%
1999	584	+2.46%
2000	578	−1.03%
2001	575	−0.52%
2002	574	−0.17%
2003	578	+0.70%
2004	588	+1.73%
2005	585	−0.51%
2006	578	−1.20%
2007	572	−1.04%
2008	560	−2.10%
2009	557	−0.54%
2010	541	−2.87%
2011	547	+1.11%
2012	539	−1.46%
2013	529	−1.86%
2014	521	−1.51%
2015	506	−2.88%
2016	502	−0.79%
