= Neuhardenberg =

- Municipality
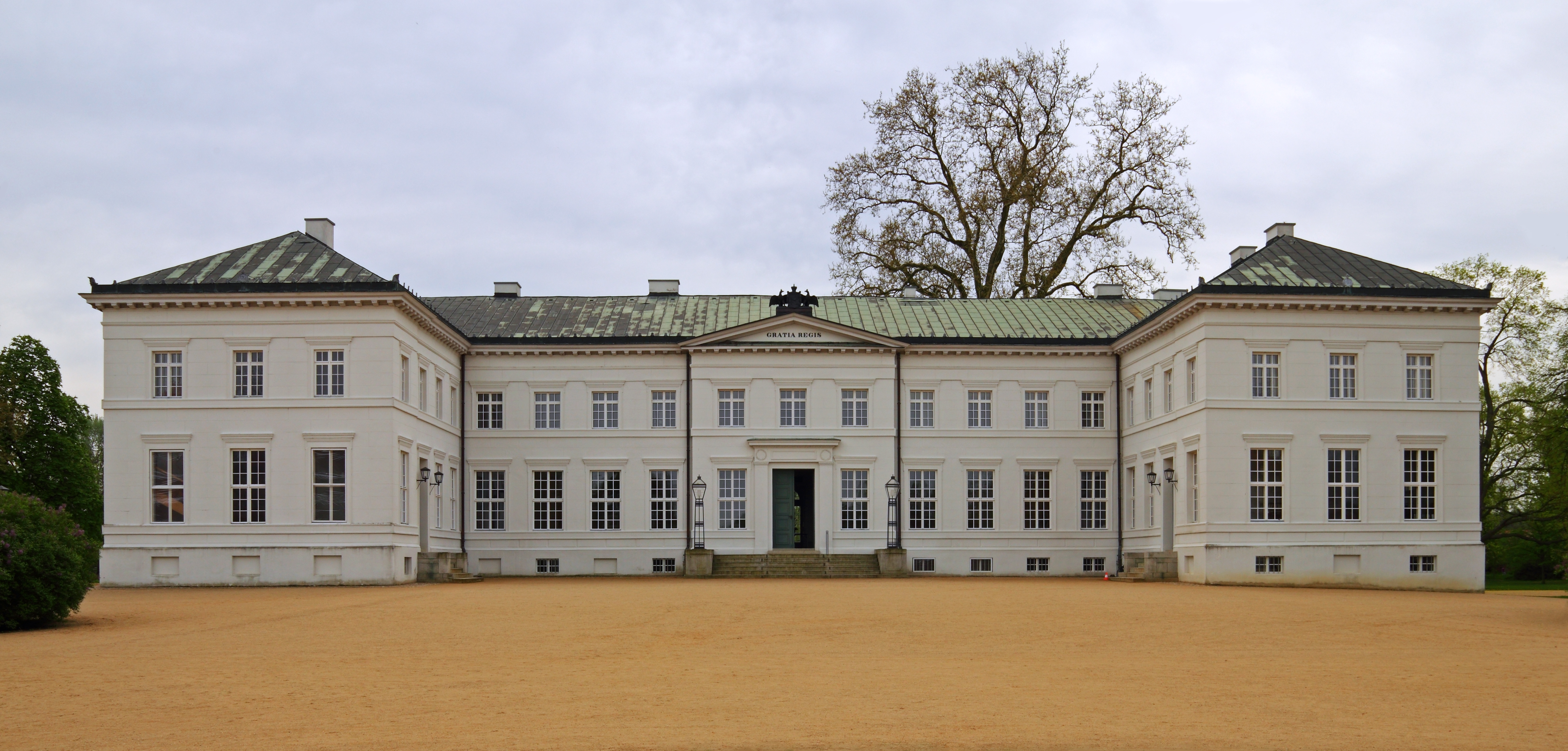
- Neuhardenberg castle

- Coat of arms

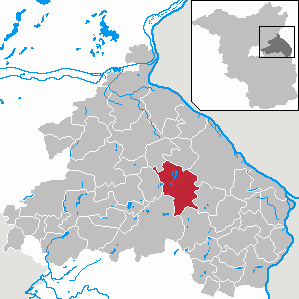
- Location of Neuhardenberg within Märkisch-Oderland district
- Interactive map of Neuhardenberg
- Location within Germany Location within Brandenburg
- Coordinates: 52°36′N 14°15′E
- Country: Germany
- State: Brandenburg
- District: Märkisch-Oderland
- Municipal assoc.: Seelow-Land
- Subdivisions: Hauptgemeinde und 3 Ortsteile

Government
  - Mayor (2024–29): Denny Rüdiger

Area
  - Total: 78.13 km^{2} (30.17 sq mi)
- Elevation: 12 m (39 ft)

Population (2025-12-31)
  - Total: 2,550
  - Density: 32.6/km^{2} (84.5/sq mi)
- Time zone: UTC+01:00 (CET)
  - Summer (DST): UTC+02:00 (CEST)
- Postal codes: 15320
- Dialling codes: 033476
- Vehicle registration: MOL
- Website: www.amt-neuhardenberg.de

Neuhardenberg (German pronunciation: [nɔʏˈhaʁdn̩bɛʁk], lit. 'New Hardenberg') is a municipality in the district Märkisch-Oderland, in Brandenburg, in north-eastern Germany. It is the site of Neuhardenberg Palace, residence of the Prussian statesman Prince Karl August von Hardenberg (1750–1822). The municipal area comprises the villages of Altfriedland, Quappendorf and Wulkow. Neuhardenberg is part of the Amt ("collective municipality") Seelow-Land.

== Names of the place ==
The oldest record mentioning the place, then named Quilicz, dates back to 1348. Later the spelling was changed into Quilitz. When in 1814 Karl August von Hardenberg received the manor, he renamed the place right away into Neu-Hardenberg (lit. 'New Hardenberg'). On Labour Day, 1 May 1949, the precursors of German Democratic Republic renamed it Marxwalde after Karl Marx. This was reversed on January 1, 1991. Since then the place has borne the old name Neuhardenberg (without the hyphen).

== History ==
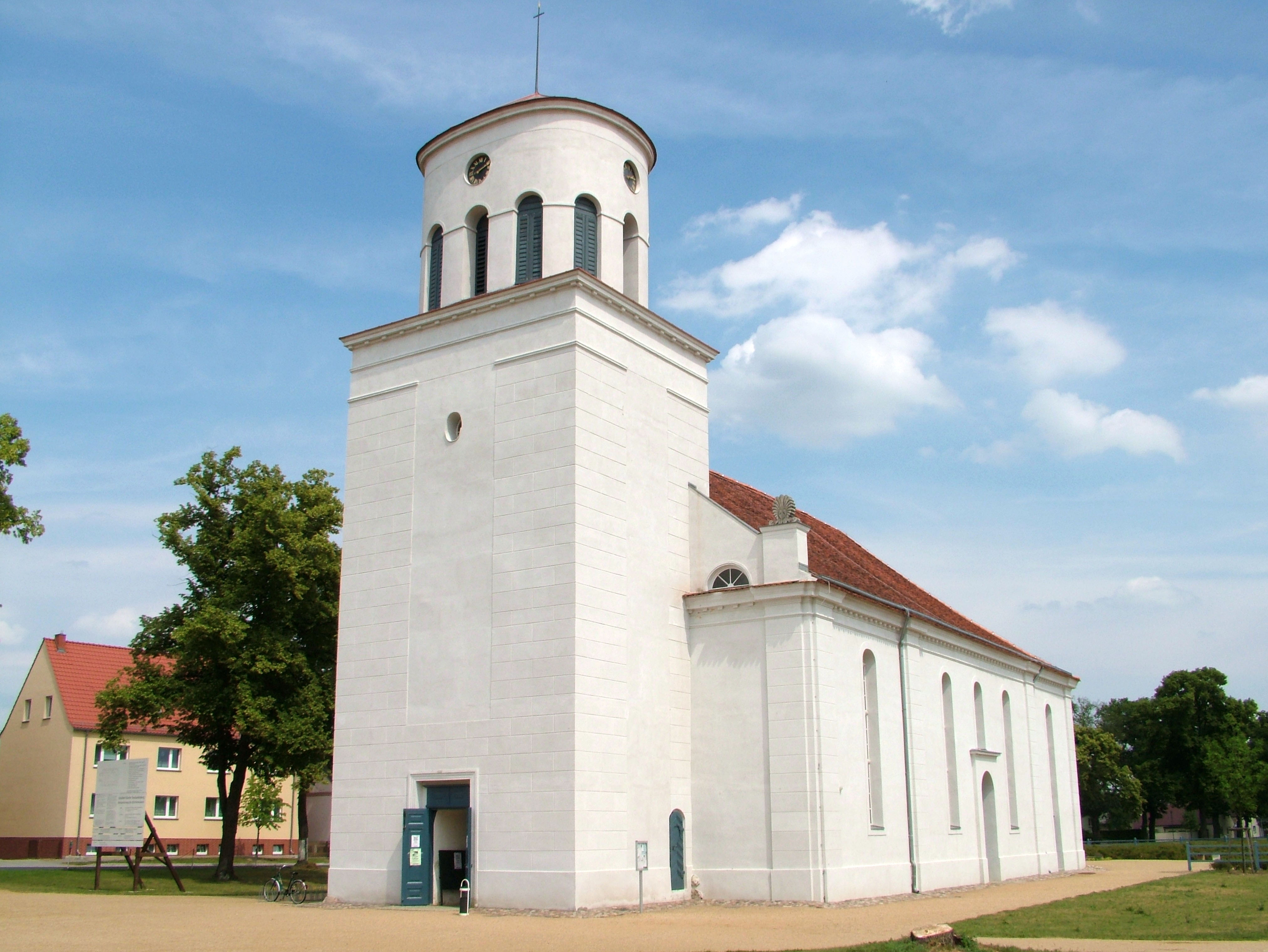
Parish church

The construction of Neuhardenberg Manor, with interior designs by Carl Gotthard Langhans, dates from the late 18th century. In 1763 the Prussian general Joachim Bernhard von Prittwitz had received Quilitz, a former property of the Pfuel noble family. The historic village was devastated by a blaze in 1801 and reconstructed as a Neoclassical model settlement according to plans by Karl Friedrich Schinkel. In 1814 King Frederick William III vested Hardenberg with the locality together with the princely title as a gratification for his merits as Prussian state chancellor. From 1820 on Schinkel also rebuilt the mansion, while the gardens were redesigned by Prince Hermann von Pückler-Muskau and Peter-Joseph Lenné.

During the Third Reich, the Ministry of Aviation (RLM) used the estate of Count (Graf) Hardenberg to establish an auxiliary airfield known as E-hafen. This was a secret test site for rocket motors and rocket boosters, developed by Hellmuth Walter and Wernher von Braun.

Later, Count von Hardenberg held clandestine meetings at the mansion in preparation for the 20 July plot to kill Hitler. After its failure, he was arrested and his properties were seized by the Nazi authorities. During World War II, there were two forced labour subcamps of the Stalag III-C prisoner-of-war camp in the settlement. In 1945 Hardenberg again had to face the condemnation of his estates by the Soviet Military Administration. The mansion was turned into a school building. From 1957 on the Marxwalde airfield, built in the 1930s, was extended as the base of an East German Air Force wing.

After reunification the manor was restored to the Hardenberg family and acquired by the Deutscher Sparkassen- und Giroverband saving banks association in 1996. After renovation it was reopened in 2002. It is today used as a conference building but also for cultural events.

== Demography ==
Development of population since 1875 within the current boundaries (Blue line: Population; Dotted line: Comparison to population development of Brandenburg state; Grey background: Time of Nazi rule; Red background: Time of communist rule)

Neuhardenberg: Population development
within the current boundaries (2013)

Year	Pop.	±% p.a.
1875	3,517	—
1890	3,250	−0.52%
1910	2,628	−1.06%
1925	2,733	+0.26%
1933	2,571	−0.76%
1939	2,455	−0.77%
1946	2,940	+2.61%
1950	3,179	+1.97%
1964	3,103	−0.17%
1971	3,799	+2.93%
1981	4,249	+1.13%
1985	4,587	+1.93%
1989	4,610	+0.13%
1990	4,555	−1.19%
1991	4,390	−3.62%
1992	4,305	−1.94%
1993	4,207	−2.28%
1994	4,237	+0.71%
1995	4,143	−2.22%
1996	4,086	−1.38%

Year	Pop.	±% p.a.
1997	3,865	−5.41%
1998	3,626	−6.18%
1999	3,417	−5.76%
2000	3,203	−6.26%
2001	3,094	−3.40%
2002	3,120	+0.84%
2003	3,035	−2.72%
2004	3,016	−0.63%
2005	2,924	−3.05%
2006	2,888	−1.23%
2007	2,840	−1.66%
2008	2,771	−2.43%
2009	2,698	−2.63%
2010	2,672	−0.96%
2011	2,464	−7.78%
2012	2,451	−0.53%
2013	2,479	+1.14%
2014	2,583	+4.20%
2015	2,715	+5.11%
2016	2,617	−3.61%

== Twin towns ==
- Myślibórz, Poland
- Hamminkeln, Germany
