= Rehfelde =

- Municipality
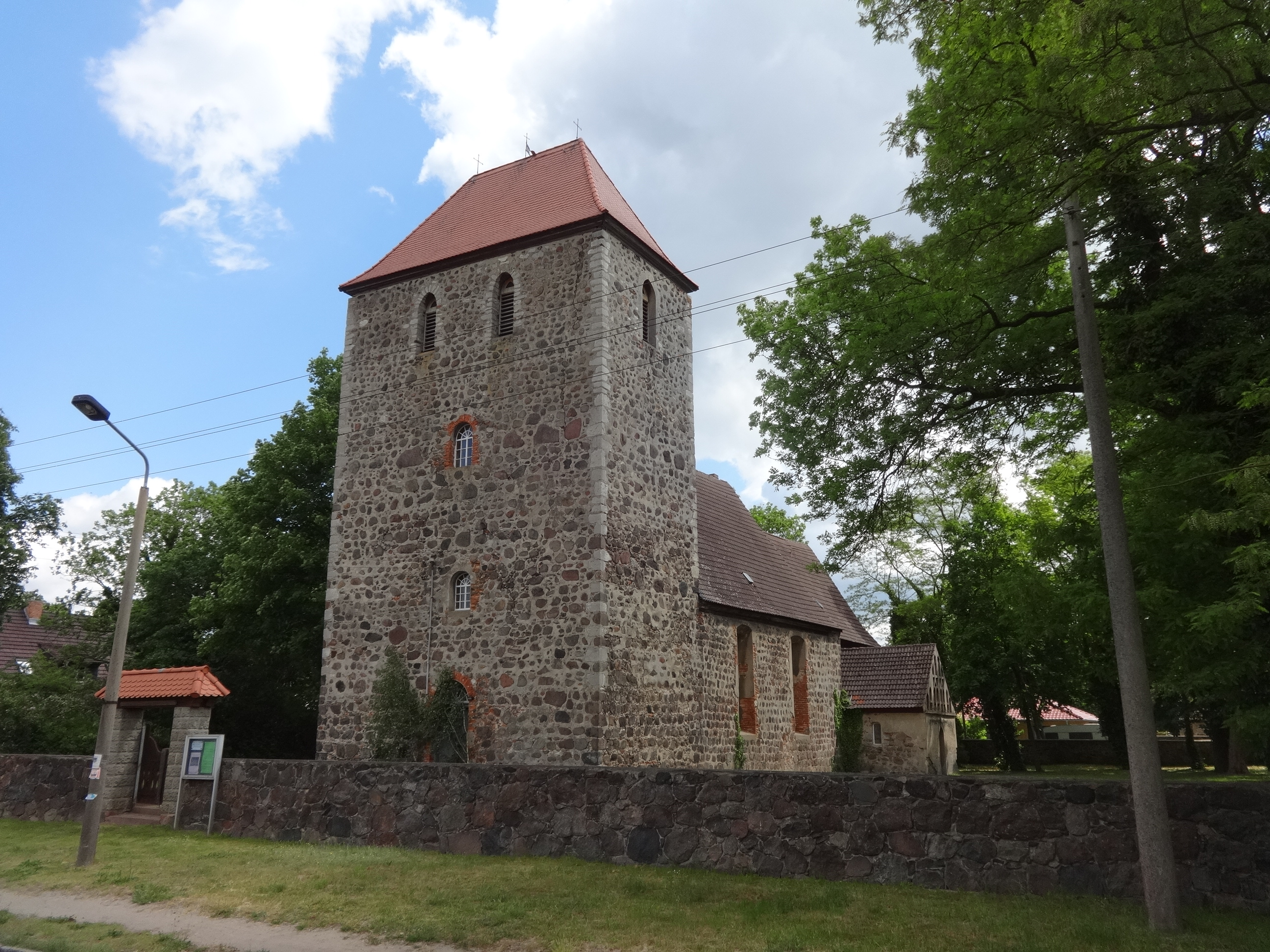
- Church in Rehfelde village

- Coat of arms

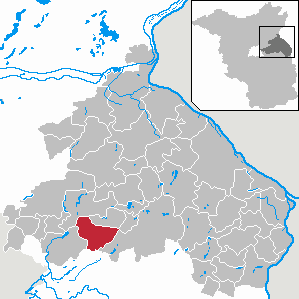
- Location of Rehfelde within Märkisch-Oderland district
- Interactive map of Rehfelde
- Location within Germany Location within Brandenburg
- Coordinates: 52°31′12″N 13°55′45″E
- Country: Germany
- State: Brandenburg
- District: Märkisch-Oderland
- Municipal assoc.: Märkische Schweiz
- Subdivisions: 3 Ortsteile

Government
  - Mayor (2024–29): Patrick Gumpricht

Area
  - Total: 46.15 km^{2} (17.82 sq mi)
- Elevation: 55 m (180 ft)

Population (2025-12-31)
  - Total: 5,386
  - Density: 116.7/km^{2} (302.3/sq mi)
- Time zone: UTC+01:00 (CET)
  - Summer (DST): UTC+02:00 (CEST)
- Postal codes: 15345
- Dialling codes: 033435
- Vehicle registration: MOL

Rehfelde is a municipality in the district Märkisch-Oderland, in Brandenburg, Germany.

== History ==
With the foundation of a plywood mill in 1906, the first manufacturing company came to Rehfelde. On September 3, 1907 the night the express train from Insterburg to Berlin derailed at a speed of about 85 km/h near Rehfelde station. On July 12, 1908 set up twelve citizens a volunteer fire department. In the early 20th century, the population rose sharply. This was due to rising rents in Berlin, which led to an increased influx. During World War I 24 community residents lost their lives. In 1922, the local branch of the Communist Party of Germany, five years later the Social Democratic Party were founded. In the period of National Socialism, some citizens of the municipality resisted the Nazis, including the communist Wilhelm Betke and the pastor Otto Perel. During World War II several houses were destroyed by bombing in the year 1944. Around 100 people lost their lives due to the war.

== After the war ==
During the land reforms in the years 1945 to 1949, the government distributed about 1,000 hectares of land to settlers and farmers. On 20 February 1953, the Landwirtschaftliche Produktionsgenossenschaft Friedrich Ebert was founded. A daycare center was opened on January 10, 1984, a youth club on October 7, 1989.

== Demography ==
Development of population since 1875 within the current boundaries (Blue line: Population; Dotted line: Comparison to population development of Brandenburg state; Grey background: Time of Nazi rule; Red background: Time of communist rule)

Rehfelde: Population development
within the current boundaries (2013)

Year	Pop.	±% p.a.
1875	1,236	—
1890	1,277	+0.22%
1910	1,501	+0.81%
1925	2,164	+2.47%
1933	2,843	+3.47%
1939	3,254	+2.28%
1946	3,395	+0.61%
1950	3,659	+1.89%
1964	3,423	−0.48%
1971	3,576	+0.63%
1981	3,234	−1.00%
1985	3,084	−1.18%
1989	2,912	−1.42%
1990	2,849	−2.16%
1991	2,841	−0.28%
1992	2,831	−0.35%
1993	2,873	+1.48%
1994	2,941	+2.37%
1995	3,045	+3.54%
1996	3,210	+5.42%
1997	3,383	+5.39%

Year	Pop.	±% p.a.
1998	3,687	+8.99%
1999	3,893	+5.59%
2000	4,088	+5.01%
2001	4,245	+3.84%
2002	4,419	+4.10%
2003	4,510	+2.06%
2004	4,569	+1.31%
2005	4,568	−0.02%
2006	4,587	+0.42%
2007	4,551	−0.78%
2008	4,502	−1.08%
2009	4,462	−0.89%
2010	4,457	−0.11%
2011	4,507	+1.12%
2012	4,551	+0.98%
2013	4,575	+0.53%
2014	4,670	+2.08%
2015	4,789	+2.55%
2016	4,847	+1.21%
2017	4,977	+2.68%
