= Seelow =

- Town
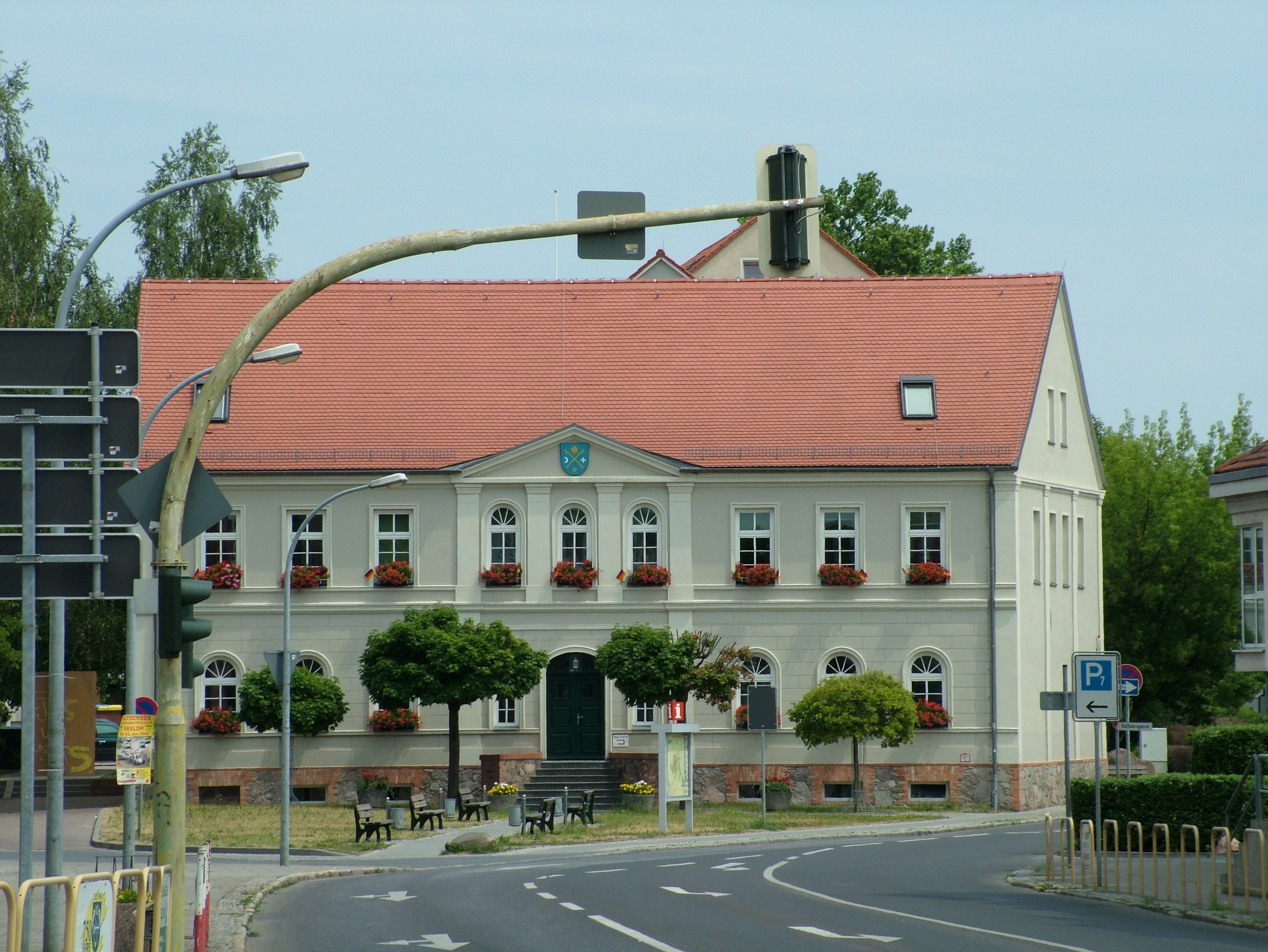
- Seelow Town Hall

- Coat of arms

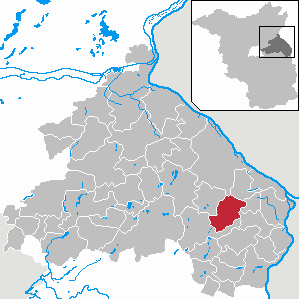
- Location of Seelow within Märkisch-Oderland district
- Interactive map of Seelow
- Location within Germany Location within Brandenburg
- Coordinates: 52°31′00″N 14°22′59″E
- Country: Germany
- State: Brandenburg
- District: Märkisch-Oderland

Government
  - Mayor (2023–31): Robert Nitz

Area
  - Total: 25.28 km^{2} (9.76 sq mi)
- Elevation: 52 m (171 ft)

Population (2025-12-31)
  - Total: 5,421
  - Density: 214.4/km^{2} (555.4/sq mi)
- Time zone: UTC+01:00 (CET)
  - Summer (DST): UTC+02:00 (CEST)
- Postal codes: 15306
- Dialling codes: 03346
- Vehicle registration: MOL, FRW, SEE, SRB
- Website: Official website

Seelow (German pronunciation: [ˈzeːloː]) is a German town, seat of the Märkisch-Oderland, a district of Brandenburg. As of 2013 its population was of 5,464.

== Geography ==
It is situated in the extreme east of Germany, 70 km (40 miles) east of Berlin, 16 km (10 miles) west of the border with Poland.

== History ==
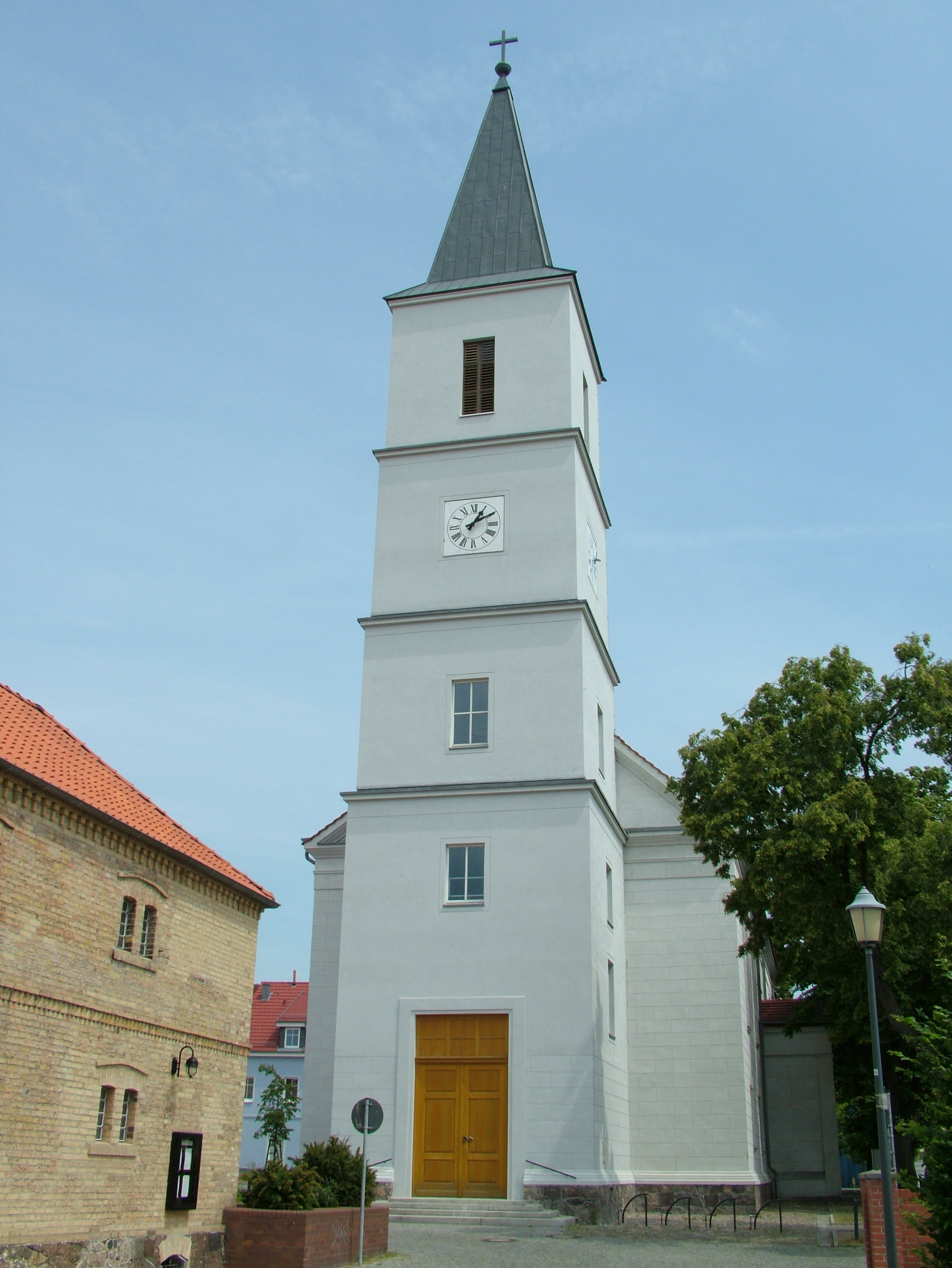
Church in Seelow

The village appears in the records held in 1252 by Archbishop Wilbrand of Magdeburg. At that time, listed as Villa Zelou, it was included in the property of the formerly Polish Bishopric of Lebus (Lubusz Land), contested between the Magdeburg archbishops and the Ascanian margraves of Brandenburg.

Seelow suffered damaging town fires in 1630, 1788 and again in 1809.

From 1816 Seelow was included for administrative purposes in the Lebus district, a subdivision of the Frankfurt Region within the Prussian Province of Brandenburg. In 1863 the district council office was relocated to Seelow and in 1950 "Lebus district" was renamed "Seelow district"; following frontier changes agreed with the Soviet Union in 1945, the town of Lebus itself had lost to Poland much of the agricultural area that had traditionally supported it. Between 1952 and 1993, Seelow was the administrative centre for the eponymous district within the larger Frankfurt territory.

Seelow was the location of one of the last major pitched battles in Europe during the Second World War - the Battle of the Seelow Heights. Between 16 and 19 April 1945, Soviet troops under Marshal Zhukov broke through the last German defensive line before Berlin. The town was largely destroyed during the battle, primarily through a major air attack which took place on 17 April 1945, and which was followed by extensive burning and plunder.

== Cultural references ==
Seelow is a playable map in the video game Call of Duty: World at War. The Battle of the Seelow Heights is featured extensively in Men of War.

== Demography ==
Development of Population since 1875 within the Current Boundaries (Blue Line: Population; Dotted Line: Comparison to Population Development of Brandenburg state; Grey Background: Time of Nazi rule; Red Background: Time of Communist rule)

Recent Population Development and Projections (Population Development before Census 2011 (blue line); Recent Population Development according to the Census in Germany in 2011 (blue bordered line); Official projections for 2005-2030 (yellow line); for 2017-2030 (scarlet line); for 2020-2030 (green line)

Seelow: Population development
within the current boundaries (2020)

Year	Pop.	±% p.a.
1875	5,736	—
1890	5,205	−0.65%
1910	4,492	−0.73%
1925	4,754	+0.38%
1939	4,420	−0.52%
1950	4,667	+0.50%
1964	5,652	+1.38%

Year	Pop.	±% p.a.
1971	5,804	+0.38%
1981	6,304	+0.83%
1985	6,457	+0.60%
1990	6,231	−0.71%
1995	5,829	−1.32%
2000	6,082	+0.85%
2005	5,776	−1.03%

Year	Pop.	±% p.a.
2010	5,540	−0.83%
2015	5,387	−0.56%
2016	5,451	+1.19%
2017	5,415	−0.66%
2018	5,426	+0.20%
2019	5,422	−0.07%
2020	5,394	−0.52%

== Twin towns – sister cities ==
Seelow is twinned with:

- Moers, Germany (1990)
- Kostrzyn nad Odrą, Poland (1998)
- Międzychód, Poland (1998)
- Nangis, France (1998)

== See also ==
- Seelow Heights
