= Lietzen =

- Municipality
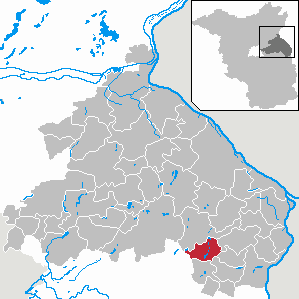
- Location of Lietzen within Märkisch-Oderland district
- Interactive map of Lietzen
- Location within Germany Location within Brandenburg
- Coordinates: 52°28′15″N 14°20′31″E
- Country: Germany
- State: Brandenburg
- District: Märkisch-Oderland
- Municipal assoc.: Seelow-Land

Government
  - Mayor (2024–29): Frank Kasper

Area
  - Total: 29.17 km^{2} (11.26 sq mi)
- Elevation: 48 m (157 ft)

Population (2025-12-31)
  - Total: 662
  - Density: 22.7/km^{2} (58.8/sq mi)
- Time zone: UTC+01:00 (CET)
  - Summer (DST): UTC+02:00 (CEST)
- Postal codes: 15306
- Dialling codes: 033470
- Vehicle registration: MOL
- Website: www.amt-seelow-land.de

Lietzen is a municipality in the district Märkisch-Oderland, in Brandenburg, Germany.

== Demography ==
Development of population since 1875 within the current boundaries (Blue line: Population; Dotted line: Comparison to population development of Brandenburg state; Grey background: Time of Nazi rule; Red background: Time of communist rule)

Lietzen: Population development
within the current boundaries (2013)

Year	Pop.	±% p.a.
1875	800	—
1890	754	−0.39%
1910	706	−0.33%
1925	903	+1.65%
1933	822	−1.17%
1939	769	−1.10%
1946	1,042	+4.44%
1950	1,100	+1.36%
1964	825	−2.03%
1971	764	−1.09%
1981	698	−0.90%
1985	711	+0.46%
1989	733	+0.76%
1990	717	−2.18%
1991	793	+10.60%
1992	778	−1.89%
1993	780	+0.26%
1994	757	−2.95%
1995	699	−7.66%
1996	771	+10.30%

Year	Pop.	±% p.a.
1997	861	+11.67%
1998	878	+1.97%
1999	906	+3.19%
2000	864	−4.64%
2001	856	−0.93%
2002	840	−1.87%
2003	808	−3.81%
2004	805	−0.37%
2005	812	+0.87%
2006	733	−9.73%
2007	725	−1.09%
2008	704	−2.90%
2009	703	−0.14%
2010	698	−0.71%
2011	682	−2.29%
2012	666	−2.35%
2013	676	+1.50%
2014	665	−1.63%
2015	736	+10.68%
2016	770	+4.62%
