= Märkisch-Oderland =

Coordinates: 52°38′N 14°8′E

- District
- Flag Coat of arms
- Country: Germany
- State: Brandenburg
- Capital: Seelow

Government
  - District admin.: Gernot Schmidt (SPD)

Area
  - Total: 2,127.7 km^{2} (821.5 sq mi)

Population (31 December 2025)
  - Total: 197,192
  - Density: 92.678/km^{2} (240.04/sq mi)
- Time zone: UTC+01:00 (CET)
  - Summer (DST): UTC+02:00 (CEST)
- Vehicle registration: MOL, FRW (former: SEE, SRB)
- Website: maerkisch-oderland.de

Märkisch-Oderland is a Landkreis (district) in the eastern part of Brandenburg, Germany. Neighboring this district are (from the north clockwise) the district of Barnim, the country of Poland, the district-free city of Frankfurt (Oder), the district of Oder-Spree and the Bundesland of Berlin. The administrative seat is the town of Seelow but the largest town is Strausberg.

== Geography ==
The district extends from the outskirts of Berlin in the west to the Oder river and the Polish border in the east. It includes a swampy area along the Oder known as the Oderbruch, about 60 km in length and 17 km in width. The Oderbruch was partially drained and populated in the 18th century. The rest of the district is mainly agricultural land.

== History ==
The district dates back to the district of Lebus and the district of Oberbarnim, which were both created in 1816. The district of Lebus dates back to the Land Lebus, the region around the town of Lebus. In 1863 Seelow became the seat of the administration of the district of Lebus, and in 1950 the district was renamed to Kreis Seelow. In 1952 the districts were split into three parts, the districts of Bad Freienwalde, Seelow and Strausberg. In 1993 the three parts were merged to form the current district - the new name refers to Northmarch lands at the Oder river.

== Demography ==
Development of Population since 1875 within the Current Boundaries (Blue Line: Population; Dotted Line: Comparison to Population Development of Brandenburg state)

Recent Population Development and Projections (Population Development before Census 2011 (blue line); Recent Population Development according to the Census in Germany in 2011 (blue bordered line); Official projections for 2005-2030 (yellow line); for 2014-2030 (red line); for 2017-2030 (scarlet line)

Landkreis Märkisch-Oderland: Population development
within the current boundaries (2025)

Year	Pop.	±% p.a.
1875	137,225	—
1890	134,950	−0.11%
1910	141,360	+0.23%
1925	157,667	+0.73%
1933	166,664	+0.70%
1939	177,555	+1.06%
1946	176,605	−0.08%
1950	192,609	+2.19%
1964	184,838	−0.29%
1971	186,206	+0.11%

Year	Pop.	±% p.a.
1981	178,519	−0.42%
1985	178,762	+0.03%
1990	174,356	−0.50%
1995	172,577	−0.20%
2000	188,277	+1.76%
2005	192,122	+0.41%
2010	190,502	−0.17%
2015	190,714	+0.02%
2020	197,195	+0.67%
2025	197,192	−0.00%

== Coat of arms ==
District banner includes the coat of arms

The coat of arms shows the eagle of Brandenburg in the upper half. The upper half also resembles the coat of arms of the former district of Oberbarnim. In the lower half are two boat-hooks and a star, both taken from the coat of arms of the former district of Seelow. The wavy line in the bottom represents the Oder river.

== Towns and municipalities ==
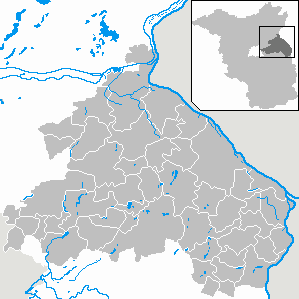
Clickable map of towns and municipalities in the district

Amt-free towns	Ämter
1. Altlandsberg; 2. Bad Freienwalde; 3. Müncheberg; 4. Seelow; 5. Strausberg; 6. Wriezen; Amt-free municipalities: 1. Fredersdorf-Vogelsdorf; 2. Hoppegarten; 3. Letschin; 4. Neuenhagen bei Berlin; 5. Petershagen-Eggersdorf; 6. Rüdersdorf bei Berlin	1. Barnim-Oderbruch; [seat: Wriezen]: 1. Bliesdorf; 2. Neulewin; 3. Neutrebbin; 4. Oderaue; 5. Prötzel; 6. Reichenow-Möglin; 2. Falkenberg-Höhe; 1. Beiersdorf-Freudenberg; 2. Falkenberg^{1}; 3. Heckelberg-Brunow; 4. Höhenland; 3. Golzow; 1. Alt Tucheband; 2. Bleyen-Genschmar; 3. Golzow^{1}; 4. Küstriner Vorland; 5. Zechin	4. Lebus; 1. Lebus^{1, 2}; 2. Podelzig; 3. Reitwein; 4. Treplin; 5. Zeschdorf; 5. Märkische Schweiz; 1. Buckow^{1, 2}; 2. Garzau-Garzin; 3. Märkische Höhe; 4. Oberbarnim; 5. Rehfelde; 6. Waldsieversdorf; 6. Seelow-Land; [seat: Seelow]: 1. Falkenhagen; 2. Gusow-Platkow; 3. Fichtenhöhe; 4. Lietzen; 5. Lindendorf; 6. Neuhardenberg; 7. Vierlinden
^{1}seat of the Amt; ^{2}town
