= Census in Germany =

Census

World map showing countries' most recent censuses as of 2020: 2015–2024 2005–2014 1995–2004 1985–1994

A national census in Germany (German: Volkszählung, pronounced [ˈfɔlksˌt͡sɛːlʊŋ]) was held every five years from 1875 to 1910. After the World Wars, only a few full population censuses have been held, the last in 1987. The most recent census, though not a national census, was the 2011 European Union census. A "micro census", with smaller samples has been held more frequently.

== Early history ==
Nuremberg in 1471 held a census, to be prepared in case of a siege. Brandenburg-Prussia in 1683 began to count its rural population. The first systematic population survey on the European continent was taken in 1719 in the Mark Brandenburg of the Kingdom of Prussia, in order to prepare the first general census of 1725.

In Habsburg ruled Austria, a population count had been introduced in 1754, but due to resistance by nobility and clerics, no full census was held after 1769. A century and many political changes later, census resumed in 1869, and were held also in 1880, 1890, 1900, 1910, in the same years as the German Empire census. Between the wars, census were held in 1920, 1923, 1934 and 1939, to be resumed in 1951 with a ten-year occurrence.

For 1806, a population of 24,241,000 for several Imperial Circles is quoted in the "Statistik des deutschen Reiches", even though the old Holy Roman Empire had fallen apart, and a new German Empire did not exist yet as a political entity. By 1821, the population within the newly founded German Confederation had grown to over 30 million.

== German Zollverein (1834–1867) ==
Zollverein and German unification

When the German Confederation had been founded in 1815, some states had been anxious to prove they had a small population in order to contribute fewer soldiers to the Federal Army. On the other hand, when the first custom union between southern states were formed, they wanted to show they had a large population in order to claim a larger share of the custom revenue. The German Customs Union, the Zollverein, conducted population counts from 1834 to 1867, every three years on 3 December, in order to share its revenue among the member states accordingly. The date of 3 December was chosen as most people of the „Zollabrechnungsbevölkerung“, the custom accounting population, were expected to be at home then. The Eastern parts of Prussia remained outside of the Confederation for most of the time, but the whole of Prussia was part of the Zollverein. While most states joined the Zollverein sooner or later, the Austrian Empire never did until the German Confederation and the Zollverein broke up in the civil war of 1866. The Zollverein regrouped and held another census in 1867, but the census of 1870 was postponed due to the ongoing Franco-German War and the foundation of the German Empire.

Date	Area in km^{2}	Population	Pop. per km^{2}	Area changes
3 December 1834	420,301	23,478,120	56	
3 December 1837	439,420	26,008,973	59	since 1835 including Land Baden and Herzogtum Nassau, since 1836 including Freie Stadt Frankfurt
3 December 1840	439,420	27,142,116	62	
3 December 1843	447,507	28,498,136	64	since 1841 including Herzogtum Braunschweig, since 1842 including Luxembourg
3 December 1846	447,507	29,461,381	66	
3 December 1849	447,507	29,800,063	67	
3 December 1852	447,507	30,492,792	68	
3 December 1855	492,621	32,721,344	66	since 1854 including Königreich Hannover, Großherzogtum Oldenburg and Schaumburg-Lippe
3 December 1858	492,621	33,542,352	68	
3 December 1861	492,621	34,670,277	70	
3 December 1864	492,621	35,886,302	73	
3 December 1867	510,628	37,512,005	73	since 1867 including Fürstentum Lübeck, Mecklenburg-Schwerin and Mecklenburg-Strelitz

== German Empire, Weimar Republic and Nazi Germany (1871–1945) ==
Starting in 1871, the census resumed in the newly united German Empire, continuing every five years from 1875 to 1910. The first large-scale census in the German Empire took place in 1895 (see German census of 1895). The last pre-war census was held on 1 December 1910. The 1915 census was canceled, but two war censuses were held on 5 December 1916 and 1917 to organize the sharing of food. Regular censuses resumed during the Weimar Republic, being held on 8 October 1919 and 16 June 1925.

Population density in the 1925 census

Occupation in the 1925 census

Religion in the 1925 census

The 1930 census was delayed until 1933 by the Depression, and another one was carried out in 1939, with both being affected by the bias of the Nazi government. Initially planned for 1937, the 1939 census now also included the areas of Austria, Sudetenland and Memelland. About 750,000 counters covered 22 million households and roughly 80 million inhabitants. Made in an atmosphere of terror, attacks on members of the Polish minority, and the demolition of Polish businesses, the census resulted in many Poles living in Germany giving their nationality as German, out of fear of losing their lives or the well-being of their families being endangered.

After the Second World War, the occupying powers started to count the population in their zones, first the Soviets on 1 December 1945, then the French on 26 January 1946. On 29 October 1946, a census was held in all four zones.

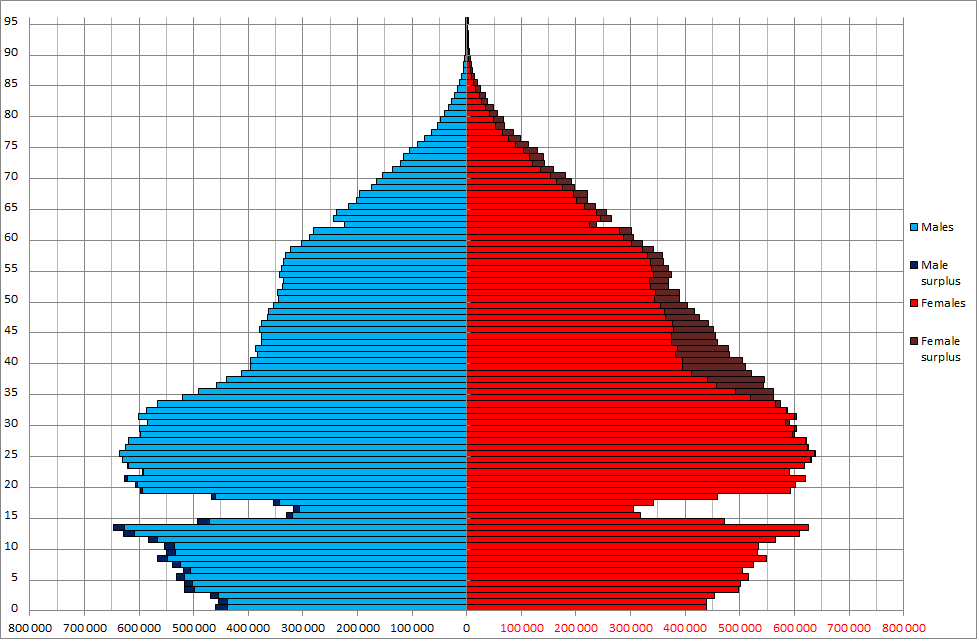
Population of Germany by аge and sex (demographic pyramid) as of 16 June 1933

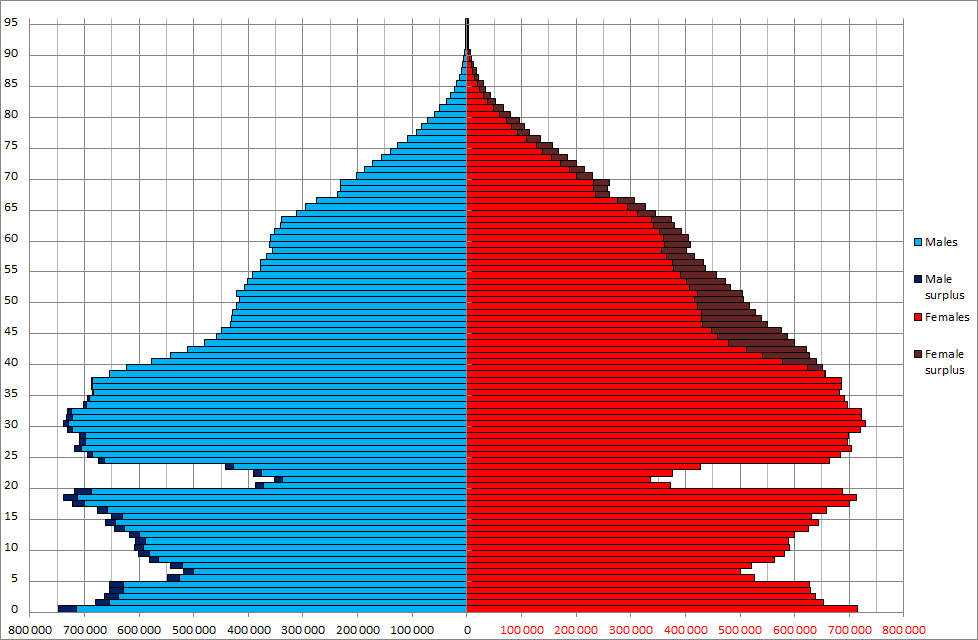
Population of Germany (includes Austria) by age and sex (demographic pyramid) as of 17 May 1939

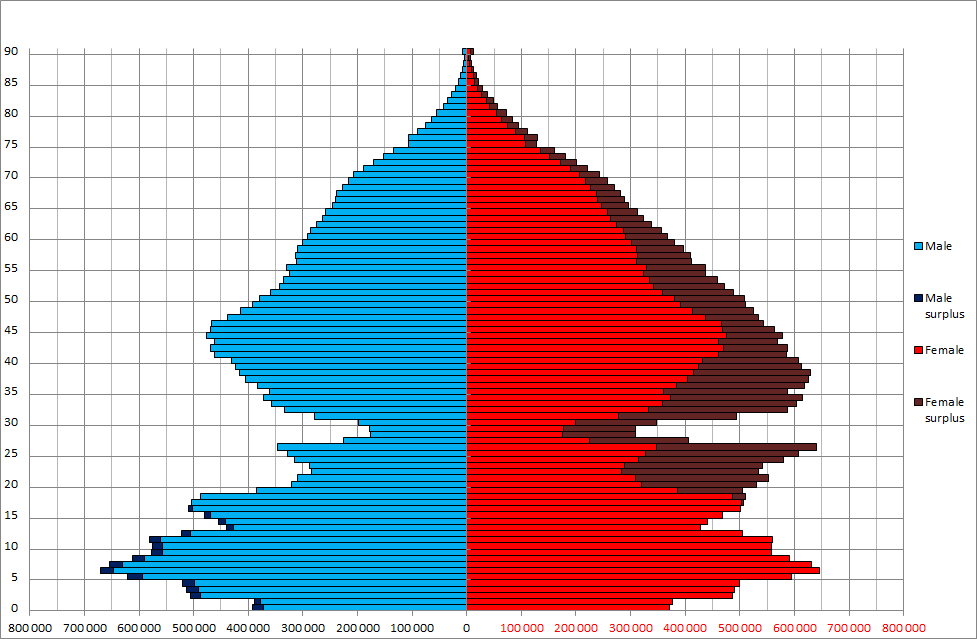
Population of Germany (excludes Saar) by аge and sex (demographic pyramid) as on 29 October 1946. Many former German soldiers didn't participate.

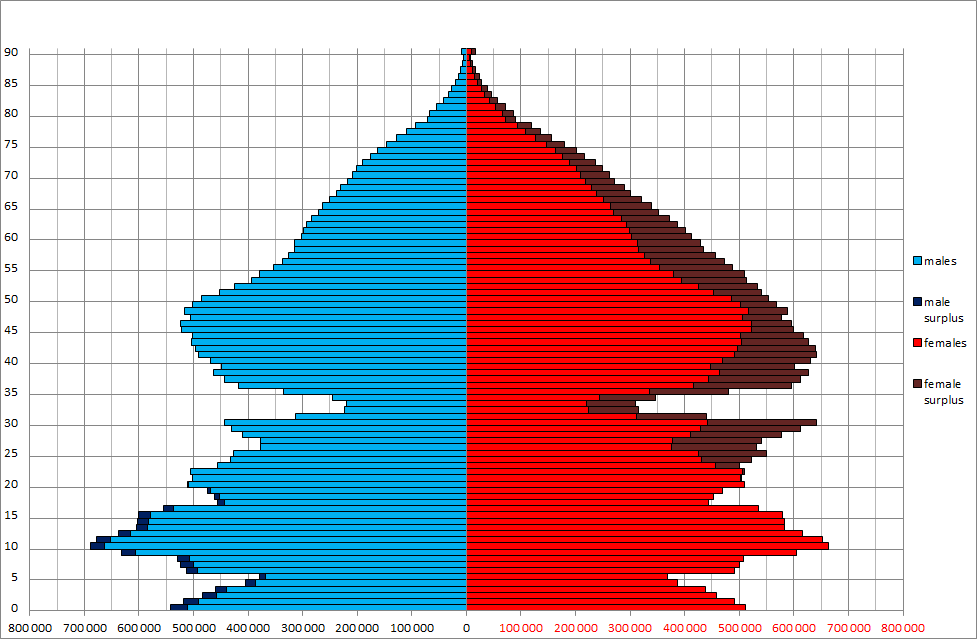
Population of Germany by аge and sex (demographic pyramid) as of 31 December 1950

Date	Area in km^{2}	Pop.	Pop. % Growth	Pop. per km^{2}	Area changes
1 December 1871	541,561	41,058,792	N/A	76	
1 December 1875	539,829	42,727,360	4.06%	79	
1 December 1880	540,522	45,234,061	5.87%	84	
1 December 1885	540,597	46,855,704	3.59%	87	
1 December 1890	540,504	49,428,470	5.49%	91	
2 December 1895	540,658	52,279,901	5.768%	97	
1 December 1900	540,743	56,367,178	7.81%	104	
1 December 1905	540,778	60,641,489	7.58%	112	
1 December 1910	540,858	64,925,993	7.07%	120	
1 December 1916	540,858	62,272,185	-4.09%	115	
5 December 1917	540,858	62,615,275	0.55%	116	
8 October 1919	474,304	60,898,584	-2.74%	128	since 1919 without Elsaß-Lothringen, Provinz Posen and Westpreußen
16 June 1925	468,718	62,410,619	2.48%	133	since 1920 without Memelland, Nordschleswig, Ostbelgien and Saargebiet, since 1922 without Ostoberschlesien
16 June 1933	468,787	65,362,115	4.73%	139	
17 May 1939	583,370	79,375,281	21.44%	136	since 1935 with Saargebiet, since 1938 with Ostmark and Sudetenland, since March 1939 with Memelland
27 May 1942					
1 March 1943					
29 October 1946	353,460	65,137,274	-17.94%	184	since 1945 without Ostgebiete des Deutschen Reiches, since 1946 without Saarland

=== Ethnic minorities in 1900 ===
According to the census of 1900, among the total population of 56,367,178 there were 51,883,131 with the German language as their first and only language, plus 252,918 bilingual Germans. The largest minority was the Polish, with 3,086,489 (not including 142,049 Masurians and 100,213 Kashubians). The census results also listed the districts with a minority larger than 5%, including many districts in which German speakers were a minority. Many of these areas would later become part of the Second Polish Republic as a result of German territorial losses in the Treaty of Versailles.

== East Germany (1949–1990) ==
The German Democratic Republic held four census during its existence, of which only the 1964 results were published in full. Unlike most European countries, which saw a significant growth of their populations, the GDR suffered a drop. Until the building of the Berlin Wall in 1961, over three million Germans had defected from the GDR to West Germany. As many young adults had chosen to leave, this also affected the numbers of babies born in the following decades.

Date	Area in km^{2}	Pop.	Pop. per km^{2}
31 August 1950	107,862	18,388,172	170
31 December 1964	108,304	17,003,655	157
1 January 1971	108,178	17,068,318	158
31 December 1981	108,333	16,705,635	154

== Federal Republic of Germany (formerly known as West Germany) (since 1949) ==
Census 2022 logo

Date	Area in km^{2}	Pop.	Pop. per km^{2}	Area changes
13 September 1950	245,770	49,842,624	203	since 1949 without East Germany, East Berlin and Saarland, with West Berlin
25 September 1956	245,860	52,195,100	212	
6 June 1961	248,456	56,174,826	226	since 1957 with Saarland
27 May 1970	248,469	60,650,584	244	
25 May 1987	248,626	61,077,042	246	
9 May 2011	357,168	80,200,000	225	since 1990 with East Germany and East Berlin
2022		82,719,540		

In the 1980s, attempts at introducing a census in West Germany sparked strong popular resentment since some felt that the questions to be asked were quite personal. Comparisons to Orwell's 1984 were drawn. Some campaigned for a boycott, or for intentional false statements. The Constitutional Court stopped the census in 1983, and required a revision of the process. The modified census was eventually held in 1987.

For 1991 a concurrent census in both West and East Germany had been planned, but it was canceled due to reunification, and replaced by a "micro census" population sample among 1 percent of house holds. Due to reunification and immigration from former Eastern Bloc states and the war-torn Balkans, the population has grown to c. 82 million in the 1990s, but no census has been held since 1987. As of July 2017 The CIA Factbook estimates the population at 80,159,662, and ranks Germany as 19th in the world. Former population censuses in Germany were complete enumerations obtained directly from the entire population in personal interviews or by questionnaire. For the 1987 population census, some 500 000 enumerators were required and for 2011, a change in methodology was planned, and the costs of the largely register-based census were expected to be only about one third of the expenditure of a traditional population census. Mainly the data already stored in the registers of the administrative authorities, in the population registers of the municipalities and the registers of the Federal Employment Agency was used. Additional data, like information on education, training and occupation, would be collected by an interview-based sample survey. The data on buildings and dwellings, for which there are no registers in Germany, would be collected by mail from all owners.

== See also ==
- Statistisches Bundesamt (Destatis)
- Demographics of Germany
- Judenzählung

== Literature ==
- Kaiserliches Statistisches Amt (Hrsg.): Statistisches Jahrbuch für das Deutsche Reich, 1880–1918
- Statistisches Reichsamt (Hrsg.): Statistisches Jahrbuch für das Deutsche Reich, 1919–1941/42
- Statistisches Bundesamt (Hrsg.): Statistisches Jahrbuch für die Bundesrepublik Deutschland, 1952 ff.
- Staatliche Zentralverwaltung für Statistik (Hrsg.): Statistisches Jahrbuch der Deutschen Demokratischen Republik, 1955–1989
