= List of Polish exonyms for places in Germany =

This is a list of Polish exonyms for cities, towns, municipalities, villages, islands, rivers, etc. located in Germany. Names officially used now are written in bold. Note that due to the complex Polish-German history, several listed names in eastern Germany have been in actual use as native names, and are thus NOT exonyms.

== Cities and towns ==
=== Brandenburg ===
==== Lubusz Land and Lusatia ====
- Beeskow Bezków
- Buckow Buków
- Calau Kaława
- Cottbus **Chociebuż**
- Döbern Debrzno
- Drebkau Drzewków
- Eisenhüttenstadt Żelazowa Huta
- Elsterwerda Wików
- Finsterwalde Grabin
- Forst (Lausitz) Barść
- Fürstenwalde Przybór
- Guben **Gubin**
- Lebus **Lubusz**
- Lieberose Luboradz/Luboraz
- Lübben (Spreewald) **Lubin**
- Lübbenau Lubniów
- Luckau Łuków
- Müllrose Miłoradz
- Müncheberg Lubiąż
- Peitz Picń/Pieczyn
- Ruhland Rolany
- Senftenberg Komorów Zły
- Seelow Zelów
- Sonnewalde Grodziszcze
- Spremberg Gródek
- Storkow Starków
- Vetschau Wietoszów

==== Uckermark ====
Part of Pomerania in the medieval period.

- Angermünde Dobrzyniec
- Brüssow Boryszewo
- Gartz Gardziec Odrzański
- Prenzlau Przęsław
- Schwedt Świecie Odrzańskie
- Templin Tęplin

==== Remainder ====
- Bad Belzig Bielczyk
- Bad Freienwalde Tarnowica
- Baruth/Mark Bart
- Brandenburg an der Havel Branibór
- Lenzen (Elbe) Łęczno
- Oderberg Odrzycko
- Potsdam **Poczdam**
- Schlieben Śliwin
- Teltow Dłutowo
- Uebigau Ubiegów
- Wriezen Wrzecień

=== Mecklenburg–Western Pomerania ===
==== Western Pomerania ====
- Anklam Nakło nad Pianą
- Barth Bardo
- Demmin Dymin
- Garz (Rügen) Gardziec Rugijski
- Greifswald Gryfia
- Gützkow Choćków
- Lassan Lesiany
- Pasewalk Pozdawilk
- Penkun Pieńkuń
- Putbus Podbórz
- Sassnitz Sośnica
- Stralsund Strzałów
- Strasburg Strażno
- Tribsees Trzebież
- Ueckermünde Wkryujście
- Usedom **Uznam**
- Wolgast Wołogoszcz

==== Mecklenburg ====
- Friedland Mirów
- Neubrandenburg Branibór Nowy
- Neustrelitz Strzelce Nowe
- Rostock Roztoka
- Schwerin Zwierzyn
- Wismar Wyszomierz

=== Saxony ===
==== Lower Silesia and Upper Lusatia ====
- Bad Muskau **Mużaków**
- Bad Schandau Szandawa
- Bautzen **Budziszyn**
- Bernsdorf Niedzichów
- Bernstadt auf dem Eigen Biernacice
- Bischofswerda Biskupice
- Görlitz Zgorzelec
- Hoyerswerda **Wojrowice**
- Herrnhut Ochranów
- Kamenz Kamieniec
- Königsbrück Kińsbork
- Lauta Łuta
- Löbau Lubiniec/Lubij
- Neugersdorf Gierałcice
- Neusalza-Spremberg Nowy Solec
- Niesky **Niska**
- Ostritz Ostrowiec
- Pulsnitz Połcznica
- Reichenbach (Oberlausitz) Rychbach
- Rothenburg, Oberlausitz Rozbork
- Schirgiswalde Zerachów
- Weißenberg Białogóra
- Weißwasser **Biała Woda**
- Wilthen Wielecin
- Wittichenau Kulów
- Zittau **Żytawa**

==== Remainder ====
- Aue Awa
- Belgern Białagóra
- Chemnitz Kamienica Saska
- Delitzsch Delicz
- Dohna Donin
- Dresden **Drezno**
- Groitzsch Groicz
- Großenhain Osiek Wielki
- Grimma Gryma
- Leipzig **Lipsk**
- Leisnig Lisnik
- Meißen **Miśnia**
- Mügeln Mogalin
- Netzschkau Nieczeków
- Neustadt in Sachsen Nowe Miasto
- Rochlitz Rochelice
- Roßwein Rozwin
- Stolpen Słupno
- Strehla Strzelin
- Torgau Torgawa
- Zwickau Ćwików

=== Saxony-Anhalt ===
- Calbe Kalwa
- Dessau Dessawa
- Gommern Gątymir
- Halle (Saale) Hala
- Lützen Łużyn
- Plön Plona
- Quedlinburg Kwedlinburg
- Querfurt Kwerfurt
- Teuchern Tucheryn
- Wettin Wettyn
- Wittenberg **Wittenberga**
- Zeitz Życz
- Zerbst Serbiszcze/Serbet

=== Other states ===
- Aachen **Akwizgran**
- Berlin Berolin, Braliń
- Braunschweig **Brunszwik**
- Bremen **Brema**
- Freiburg **Fryburg Bryzgowijski**
- Freising **Fryzynga**
- Geldern Geldrya
- Göttingen **Getynga**
- Hannover **Hanower**
- Kiel **Kilonia**
- Koblenz **Koblencja**
- Konstanz **Konstancja**
- Köln **Kolonia**
- Lübeck **Lubeka**
- Mainz **Moguncja**
- München **Monachium**
- Münster Monaster
- Nürnberg **Norymberga**
- Oldenburg in Holstein Starogród
- Passau **Pasawa**
- Regensburg **Ratyzbona**
- Schleswig **Szlezwik**
- Speyer **Spira**
- Trier **Trewir**
- Tübingen **Tybinga**
- Worms **Wormacja**
- Zweibrücken Dwamosty

== Municipalities, villages and districts ==
=== Brandenburg ===
==== Lubusz Land and Lusatia ====
- Atterwasch Ostrowiec
- Biehlen Belnach
- Bloischdorf Błoboszojce
- Bomsdorf Bogumiłów
- Booßen Bożeń
- Bremsdorf Broniszów
- Briesen (Mark) Brzezin
- Brieskow Wrzesko
- Burg (Spreewald) Borkowy
- Coschen Kosin
- Diedersdorf Górnica
- Diehlo Działów
- Döbberin Dobrzyń
- Doberlug Dobryług
- Dolgelin Dołgolin
- Drehnow Drzonów
- Falkenhagen Rokowo
- Friedersdorf Sienno
- Fünfeichen Dębiny
- Guhro Góry
- Genschmar Jęczmierz
- Golzow Golczów
- Gorgast Gorgoszcz
- Groß Breesen Brzezina
- Groß Döbbern Dobrynia Wielka
- Groß Drewitz Drzewice
- Groß Kölzig Kolsk Wielki
- Guhrow Góry
- Gulben Gółbin
- Großkoschen Wielka Koszyna
- Güldendorf Cieszonowo
- Gusow Guzów
- Henzendorf Wiesławiec
- Hohenbocka Buków
- Horno Rogów
- Hornow Rogów
- Hosena Gozdno
- Jacobsdorf Wadochowice
- Kieselwitz Kiślica
- Kleinkoschen Mała Koszyna
- Klettwitz Kletwice
- Klinge Klinka
- Kolkwitz Gołkojce
- Kroppen Kropno
- Küstrin-Kietz Chyża
- Lehde Leda
- Leipe Lipie/Lipna
- Letschin Lucin
- Lichtenberg Orlica
- Libbenichen Łubianka
- Lietzen Leśnica
- Lossow Łosowo
- Lubolz Lubolce
- Lugau Ług
- Markendorf Słubia
- Möbiskruge Laski
- Neuhardenberg Kwilica
- Neuhausen/Spree Kopańce
- Neulangsow Nowy Łększów
- Neupetershain-Nord Wiki
- Neuzelle Sławin
- Niederjesar Jezioro Dolne
- Niemtsch Niemieszk
- Obersdorf Stawno
- Peickwitz Pietrzykowice
- Petersdorf Piotrowice
- Petershagen Piotrówko
- Pillgram Pielgrzym
- Podelzig Podolsk
- Pohlitz Police
- Rathstock Roztok
- Reitwein Rytwiny
- Rießen Raszyn
- Sacro Zakrzów
- Schenkendöbern Dobrzyńsko
- Schönfließ Czeranowo
- Schönfließ Potoczna
- Sembten Czempiń
- Steinsdorf Szczeniowice
- Trebnitz Trzebnica
- Treplin Trzepielin
- Treppeln Trzebule
- Vogelsang Ptaszkowice
- Wellmitz Wielmice
- Werbig Wierzbki
- Wiesenau Sucha Grobla
- Zechin Czechyn
- Ziltendorf Sułocin

==== Uckermark ====
Part of Pomerania in the medieval period.

- Altkünkendorf Bakowo
- Battin Batyń
- Biesenbrow Wyszemborów
- Briest Brzeście/Brześć
- Carmzow Karniszów
- Casekow Kosków
- Criewen Krzywin
- Damme Dębno
- Dobberzin Dobrocin
- Felchow Wielichów
- Flemsdorf Dziężno
- Golm Chełm
- Gramzow Gręzowo
- Greiffenberg Gryfów
- Heinersdorf Radosław
- Hohenreinkendorf Trzebież
- Hohenselchow Zelechowo Górne
- Kerkow Kierzków
- Kunow Kunów
- Lützlow Lusław
- Meichow Miechów
- Mescherin Moskorzyn
- Neukünkendorf Kątki
- Passow Parsów
- Petershagen Parów
- Pinnow Pniów
- Schmargendorf Płoniec
- Schmölln Smolno
- Stolpe Słup
- Tantow Tętowa
- Vierraden Koła
- Wallmow Wolimów
- Wartin Warcin
- Wollschow Wilczków
- Woltersdorf Klicz
- Zichow Cichów

==== Remainder ====
- Altranft Dubielno
- Altreetz Stara Rzeczyca
- Bralitz Bralice
- Britz Brzózki
- Brodowin Brodwin
- Falkenberg Poradz
- Hohenfinow Winawa Górna
- Kloster Lehnin Lenin
- Liepe Lipa
- Lunow Łunów
- Neuenhagen Strzelice
- Neuglietzen Nowe Gliśno
- Neulewin Łowinek
- Neutrebbin Trzebin
- Niederfinow Winawa Dolna
- Neurüdnitz Nowa Rudnica
- Parstein Parszczyn
- Senftenhütte Sulisław

=== Mecklenburg–Western Pomerania ===
==== Western Pomerania ====
- Ahlbeck Przyjezierze
- Ahlbeck, Heringsdorf Czernin
- Alt Kosenow Koszonów
- Altkamp Kępa Stara
- Altwarp Stare Warpno
- Bansin Badzyń Morski
- Benz Benice
- Bergen auf Rügen Góra
- Binz Bińce
- Bismark Bezmierzów
- Breege Brzeg
- Bugewitz Boguszewice
- Dargen Darginia
- Dranske Dręska
- Ducherow Tchórzów
- Eggesin Kcynia
- Gager Jawory
- Garz (Usedom) Gardziszcze
- Gellenthin Jelęcin
- Gingst Jińszcz
- Glasow Głazów
- Gnies Kniezice/Gniedzice
- Göhren Górzno
- Grambin Grąbin
- Grambow Grębowo
- Granskevitz Grążkowice
- Grieben Grzybno
- Groß Kubbelkow Kobełków Wielki
- Gummlin Chomlin
- Gumnitz Gumienica
- Hanshagen Januszów
- Heringsdorf Cieszęcin
- Hintersee Zajezierze
- Hoppenwalde Chmielisz
- Jabelitz Jablice
- Jatznick Jasiennik
- Kammin Kamień
- Kamminke Kamionka
- Kampe Kępa
- Karnitz Karnice
- Karow Karwów
- Kasnevitz Karśniewice
- Kemnitz Kamienica
- Klein Kubbelkow Kobełków Mały
- Kluis Kluczyce
- Kluptow Kłopotów
- Koblentz Kobelnica
- Koldevitz Kołowice
- Korswandt Kurozwęcz
- Koserow Kosarzewo
- Kowall Kowal
- Krackow Kraków
- Krakvitz Krakowice
- Kröslin Chroślin
- Krugsdorf Świechcin
- Krummin Kromnin
- Lebbin Lubień
- Lehsten Leszczno
- Libnitz Lubanowice
- Liepgarten Lipia Góra
- Lieschow Lisków
- Lietzow Lisów
- Lipsitz Lubieszyce
- Litzenhagen Lisów
- Lohme Łom
- Löcknitz Łęknica
- Löwitz Łowicz
- Lubkow Lubków
- Lubmin Lubomin
- Mellenthin Mielęcin
- Mewegen Niedźwiady
- Mönkebude Miękiebuty
- Murchin Mrochyń
- Mönchow Minchów
- Nadrensee Nadręże
- Neuenkirchen Jamno
- Peenemünde Pianoujście
- Pudagla Podegłowa
- Putgarten Podgrodzie
- Putzar Pożar
- Rankwitz Rankowice
- Ranzin Rądzieszyn
- Retzin Rzeczyn
- Rubkow Robaków
- Sagard Zagrodzie
- Schaprode Zabrodzie
- Schlatkow Składkowice
- Schwichtenberg Świekotów
- Sellin Zieleń
- Sommersdorf Sambórz
- Sonnenberg Świątniki
- Stolpe an der Peene Słup
- Stolpe auf Usedom Słup
- Storkow Starków
- Streu Zdroje
- Thiessow Cisów
- Torgelow Stare Turzegłowy
- Trips Trzebieszyce
- Viereck Krzewiec
- Warsin Warszyn
- Welzin Wilczyn
- Wollin Wolino
- Wusterhusen Ostrożno
- Zarnekow Czarnków
- Zemitz Siemice
- Zempin Czempin
- Zerrenthin Czarnocino
- Ziethen Sitno
- Zinnowitz Cis
- Zirchow Sierchów

=== Saxony ===
==== Lower Silesia and Upper Lusatia ====
- Altliebel Lubolin
- Arnsdorf Warnołcice
- Auritz Wurice
- Auschkowitz Uczkowice
- Baruth bei Bautzen Bart
- Baßlitz Pazlice
- Bernbruch Barbuk
- Bluno Błonie/Bluń
- Boblitz Bobolce
- Boritz Boruz
- Bornitz Boranowice
- Breitendorf Ujazd
- Bröthen Bretnia
- Boxberg Hamor
- Brießnitz Brzezowice
- Brösa Brysin
- Buchholz Krzyzów
- Buchwalde Bukojna
- Burgneudorf Nowa Wieś
- Burkau Porchów
- Caßlau Koslow
- Commerau Komarów
- Daubitz Dębiec/Dubc
- Deutsch Ossig Osiek
- Diehsa Dzieża
- Doberschau Dobrusz
- Döbschütz Dobszyce
- Döhlen Delany
- Dörgenhausen Niemcy
- Dretschen Drzeczyn
- Ebendörfel Bielczyce
- Förstgen Długa Borszcz
- Gablenz Jabłoniec
- Gaußig Huska
- Geierswalde Lejno
- Glaubnitz Hłupońca
- Göda Hodżij
- Groß Düben Dziewin
- Groß Krauscha Grusza
- Großhänchen Wosyk Wielki
- Hagenwerder Niekras
- Horka Górka
- Halbendorf Brzezówka
- Halbendorf/Spree Półpica
- Jahmen Jamno
- Jauernick Jawornik
- Jetscheba Jatrzob
- Keula Kuja
- Kittlitz Kietlice
- Kirschau Korzym
- Klein Düben Dziewink
- Klein Priebus Mały Przewóz
- Kleinhänchen Wosyk Mały
- Kleinseidau Zajdow
- Klitten Kletno
- Kollm Chełm
- Krauschwitz Kruszwica
- Kreba Krzebów
- Kunnerwitz Koniarzewice
- Laubusch Lubusz
- Lauske Łusk
- Lauske Łusk
- Lautitz Łuwocice
- Lehn Lejno
- Lehn Lejno
- Leipgen Lipniki
- Lippitsch Lipicz
- Lohsa Łaz
- Lömischau Lemiszów
- Lomske Łomsk
- Lomske Łomsk
- Luppa Łupoj
- Melaune Mirów
- Meuselwitz Myślice
- Michalken Michałki
- Mücka Mików
- Mühlrose Miłoraz
- Mulkwitz Mułkowice
- Neudorf Nowa Wieś
- Neudorf Nowa Wieś
- Neudorf Nowa Wieś
- Neuwiese Nowa Łuka
- Pechern Smolarze
- Petershain Hoźnica
- Podrosche Podroże
- Prachenau Prochnów
- Quolsdorf Chwalice
- Reichwalde Rychwałd
- Rietschen Ryczyn
- Rohne, Schleife Równe
- Sagar Zagórze
- Särichen Żdżary
- Schleife Ślepe
- Schwarzkollm Czarny Chełmiec
- Spohla Spale
- Spreewiese Lichań
- Spreewitz Sprewice
- Strehla Strzelin
- Trebendorf Trebin
- Uhyst Ujazd
- Weinhübel Leszwice
- Weißig Wysoka
- Weißig Wysoka
- Weißkeißel Wuskidz
- Wiednitz Wiednice
- Wurschen Dworce/Worczyn
- Zeißig Cisk

==== Remainder ====
- Groitzsch Grodziszcze
- Lohmen Łomno
- Lommatzsch Łomacz
- Räcknitz Raknica

=== Berlin ===
- Friedrichstadt Bedrzychów
- Friedrichswerder Bedrzyckie Wyspy
- Köpenick Kopanica
- Spandau Spandawa

=== Saxony-Anhalt ===
- Großgörschen Goresin
- Leitzkau Liszka

== Natural locations ==
- Donau **Dunaj** (river)
- Elbe **Łaba** (river)
- Fränkische Saale **Soława Frankońska** (river)
- Ganznowsee Jezioro Chąsinów (lake)
- Golm Chełm (hill)
- Greifswalder Oie Święty Ostrów (island)
- Großer Koblentzer See Jezioro Kobelnica (lake)
- Havel **Hawela** (river)
- Isar **Izara** (river)
- Jasmund Jasmat (peninsula)
- Koschenberg Koszyńska Góra (hill)
- Löbauer Wasser Łubata (river)
- Main **Men** (river)
- Malxe Małksa (river)
- Mönchgut Mnichów (peninsula)
- Mosel **Mozela** (river)
- Mulde **Mulda** (river)
- Nordfriesischen Inseln **Wyspy Północnofryzyjskie**
- Ostfriesische Inseln **Wyspy Wschodniofryzyjskie**
- Peene **Piana** (river)
- Pulsnitz Półcznica (river)
- Putzarer See Jezioro Pożar (lake)
- Randow Rędowa (river)
- Recknitz Reknica (river)
- Rhein **Ren** (river)
- Riether Werder Ostrów (island)
- Roter Main **Czerwony Men** (river)
- Ruden Rudno (island)
- Rügen **Rugia** (island)
- Ruhr **Ruhra** (river)
- Saale **Soława** (river)
- Saar **Saara** (river)
- Schmollensee Jezioro Smolno (lake)
- Schwarze Elster **Czarna Elstera** (river)
- Schwarzer Schöps Czarny Szepc (river)
- Schweriner See Jezioro Zwierzyńskie (lake)
- Spree **Sprewa** (river)
- Trebel Trzebież (river)
- Uecker **Wkra** (river)
- Unstrut **Unstruta** (river)
- Vilm Ilmo (island)
- Weiße Elster **Biała Elstera** (river)
- Weißer Main **Biały Men** (river)
- Weser **Wezera** (river)
- Wolgastsee Jezioro Ołogoszcz (lake)

== See also ==
- List of European exonyms
- List of German exonyms for places in Poland

== Bibliography ==
- Damrot, Konstanty (1896). Die älteren Ortsnamen Schlesiens, ihre Entstehung und Bedeutung. Mit einem Anhange über die schlesisch-polnischen Personennamen. Beiträge zur schlesischen Geschichte und Volkskunde (in German). Verlag von Felix Kasprzyk.
- Jordan, Jan Pětr (1845). Vollständiges Taschenwörterbuch der polnischen und deutschen Sprache/Dokładny słowniczek polsko-niemiecki i niemiecko-polski (in Polish and German). Leipzig.
- Kozierowski, Stanisław (1935). Atlas nazw geograficznych Słowiańszczyzny Zachodniej. Zeszyt IIB (in Polish). Poznań.
- Linde, Samuel Bogumił (1857). Słownik języka polskiego (in Polish). Vol. III. Lwów: Zakład Ossolińskich.
- Mrongovius, Christoph Cölestin (1823). Słownik niemiecko-polski. Deutsch-polnisches Handworterbuch (in Polish and German). Danzig.
- Rehman, Antoni (1904). Niżowa Polska opisana pod względem fizyczno-geograficznym (in Polish). Lwów.
- Sieniawski, Karol Emil (1881). Pogląd na dzieje Słowian zachodnio-północnych między Łabą (Elbą) a granicami dawnej Polski od czasu wystąpienia ich na widownię dziejową aż do utraty politycznego bytu i znamion narodowych (in Polish). Gniezno.
- Zarański, Stanisław (1878). Geograficzne imiona słowiańskie zestawione alfabetycznie według nazw ich niemieckich, włoskich, rumuńskich, węgierskich i tureckich, z dodaniem niektórych łotyskich i innych zagranicznych spolszczonych (in Polish). Kraków.
- Leksykon Polactwa w Niemczech (in Polish). Opole: Związek Polaków w Niemczech. 1939.
- Skorowidz gmin Śląska Dolnego i Opolskiego z niemieckimi i polskimi nazwami miejscowości według stanu z dnia 1 stycznia 1941 (in Polish). Katowice: Instytut Śląski. 1945.
- Skorowidz Niemiecko-Polski i Polsko-Niemiecki miast, miasteczek i większych wsi Prus Książęcych i Królewskich, W. Ks. Poznańskiego i Śląska (in Polish). Warszawa: Zakłady Graficzne Ministerstwa Spraw Wojsk. 1919.
- Słownik geograficzny Królestwa Polskiego i innych krajów słowiańskich, Tom I (in Polish). Warszawa. 1880.
- Słownik geograficzny Królestwa Polskiego i innych krajów słowiańskich, Tom II (in Polish). Warszawa. 1881.
- Słownik geograficzny Królestwa Polskiego i innych krajów słowiańskich, Tom III (in Polish). Warszawa. 1882.
- Słownik geograficzny Królestwa Polskiego i innych krajów słowiańskich, Tom IV (in Polish). Warszawa. 1883.
- Słownik geograficzny Królestwa Polskiego i innych krajów słowiańskich, Tom V (in Polish). Warszawa. 1884.
- Słownik geograficzny Królestwa Polskiego i innych krajów słowiańskich, Tom IX (in Polish). Warszawa. 1888.
- Słownik geograficzny Królestwa Polskiego i innych krajów słowiańskich, Tom XII (in Polish). Warszawa. 1892.
- Słownik geograficzny Królestwa Polskiego i innych krajów słowiańskich, Tom XIV (in Polish). Warszawa. 1895.
