= Raklitza =

River in Germany

Location
- Country: Germany
- State: Saxony

Physical characteristics
- Mouth
  - location: Weißer Schöps
  - coordinates: 51.3974°N 14.7483°E

Basin features
- Progression: Weißer Schöps→ Schwarzer Schöps→ Spree→ Havel→ Elbe→ North Sea

Raklitza is a river of Saxony, Germany. It is a right tributary of the Weißer Schöps, which it joins near Rietschen.

== See also ==
- List of rivers of Saxony
