= Teicha (Rietschen) =

Teicha Hatk
- Village
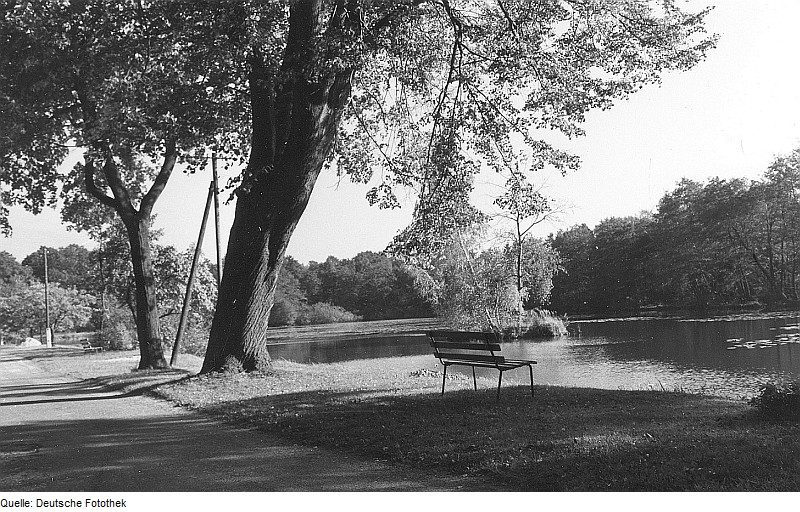
- Overlooking the mill pond (1985)

- Location within Germany
- Coordinates: 51°23′15″N 14°48′55″E
- Country: Germany
- State: Saxony
- Established: 1402 or before

Area
  - Total: 1.07 sq mi (2.77 km^{2})
- Elevation: 469 ft (143 m)

Population (2009)
  - Total: 208
  - Density: 194/sq mi (75.1/km^{2})
- ZIP: 02956
- Area code: 035 772

Teicha is a village and district of the municipality of Rietschen in the Saxon district of Görlitz.

== Geography ==
Teicha lies on the northern edge of the Teichaer Hill Chain, the last foothills of the Lusatian Hill Country, southeast of Rietschen on the northwest side of the railway line Berlin-Görlitz between the stations Rietschen and Hähnichen. The place is surrounded with mainly meadows and fields in the south and west. This is followed a wooded area in the north and east. Southeast of the settlement border, is the mill pond and the larger Oats Pond.

The adjacent places are Rietschen and Neuhammer in the northwest, Daubitz in the northeast, Quolsdorf and Hähnichen in the southeast, Zedlig in the southwest, and Prauske in the west. The village is divided into the areas of Dorfteile Teicha, Neu-Teicha, Buschmühle, and Alte Ziegelei.

== History ==
The oldest known written mention of Teicha was in 1402. By the beginning of the following century, the village belonged to Daubitz.

Teicha then became a parish after Daubitz. During or shortly after the reformation, a school was established.

In the wake of the Peace of Prague, Teicha created Upper and Lower Lusatia.

In the 18th and 19th Century, Teicha had two water-powered mills (including an oil mill) and a water-powered Garnbleiche. They existed until 1895.

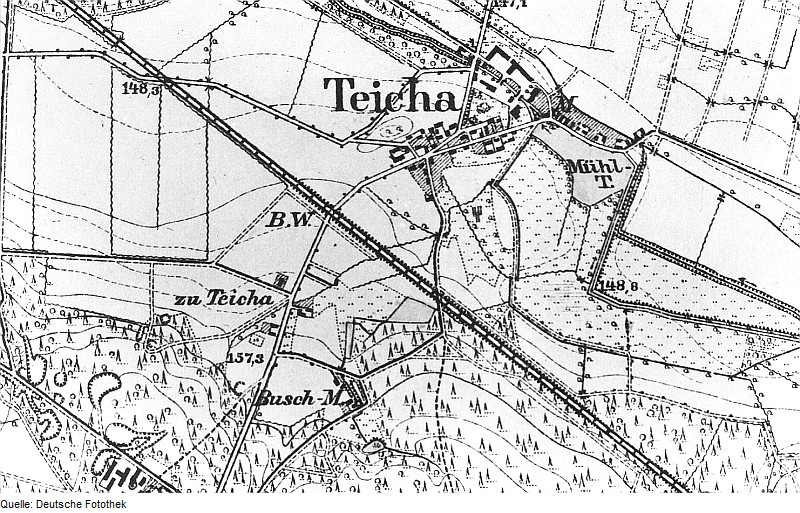
1880s map

Teicha has had a fire department since 1915.

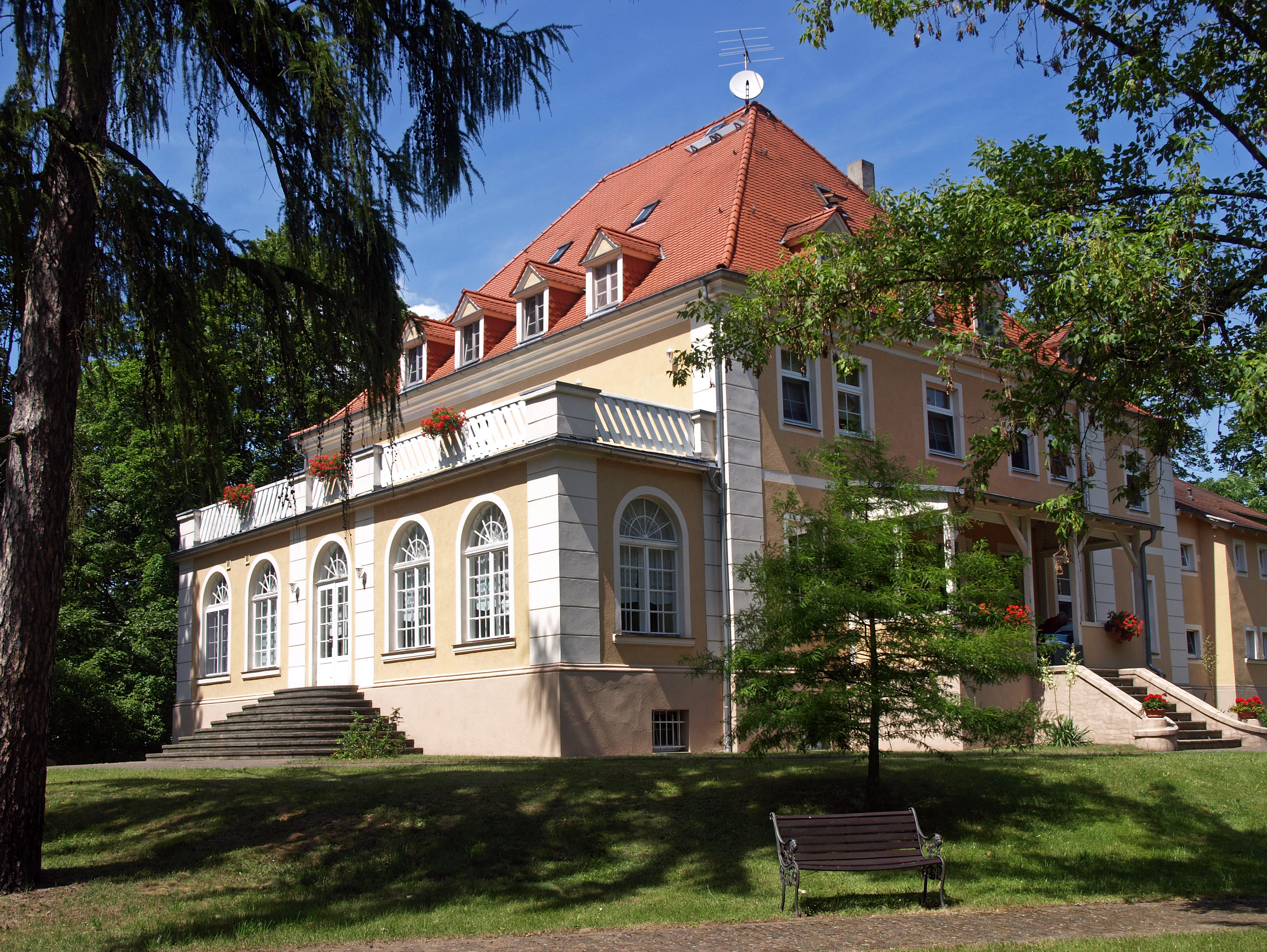
A mansion in Teicha.

== Demographics ==
Year Population

- 1825 190
- 1863 220
- 1871 246
- 1885 228
- 1905 263
- 1925 344
- 1939 329
- 1946 283
- 1950 312
- 1964 276
- 1971 288
- 1988 218
- 1990 218
- 1999 222
- 2002 244
- 2009 208

From the first population census in 1825, the population nearly doubled from 190 to 344 in 1925, but then fell back to around 280 in 1946. Apart from some fluctuations, it remained in this state until the 1970s, then, the population fell to about 220 in the 1980s and 1990s. Around the beginning of the 2000s, Teicha had almost 250 inhabitants, there were only 208 in 2009.

Around the end of the 19th century, Teicha was almost purely German and was near the edge of the Sorbian area.
