= Weißer Schöps =

River in Germany

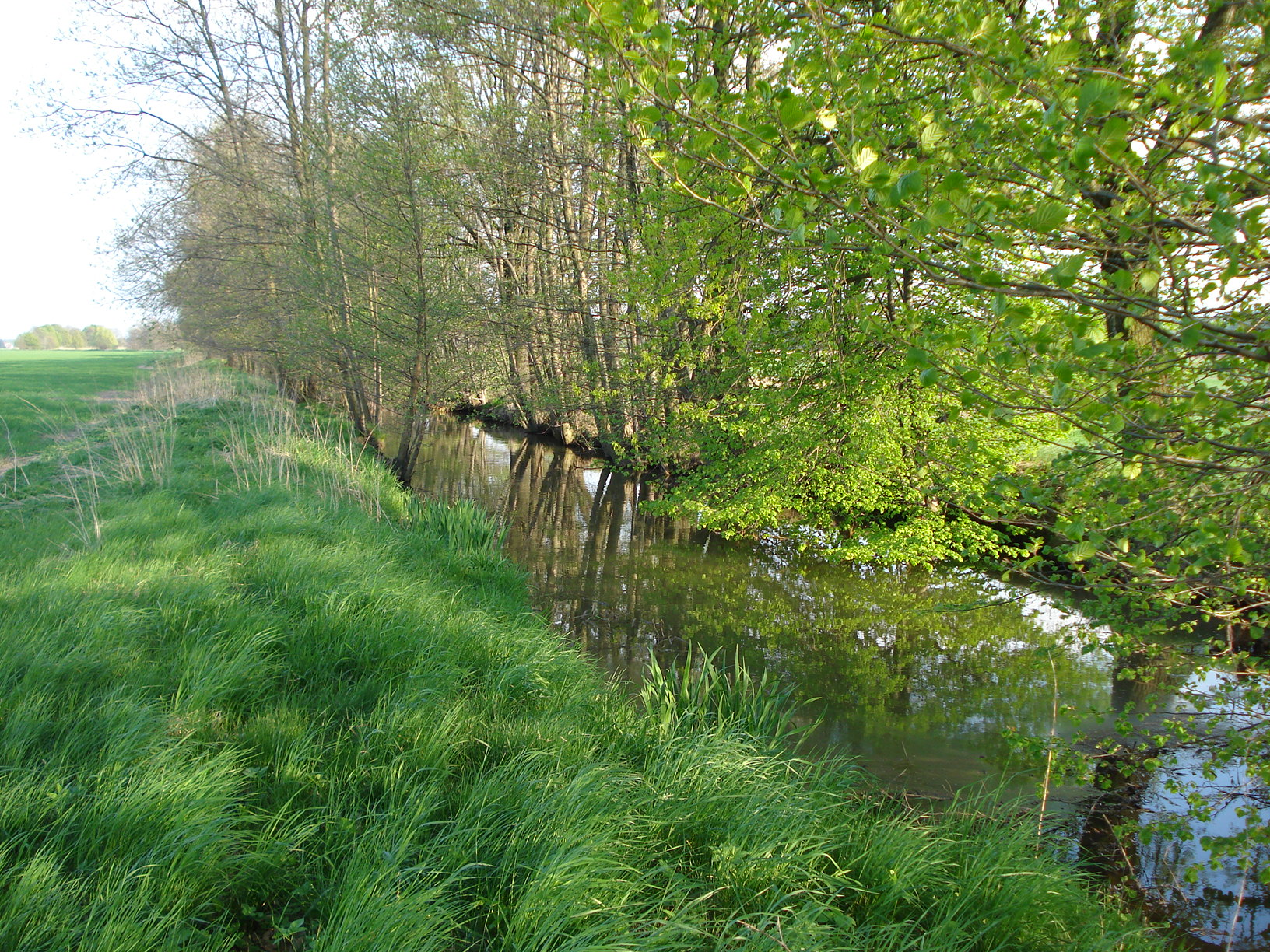

Location
- Country: Germany
- State: Saxony

Physical characteristics
- Mouth
  - location: Schwarzer Schöps
  - coordinates: 51.3997°N 14.6104°E

Basin features
- Progression: Schwarzer Schöps→ Spree→ Havel→ Elbe→ North Sea
- Tributaries
  - right: Raklitza

The Weißer Schöps is a river of Saxony, Germany. It is a right tributary of the Schwarzer Schöps, which it joins near Boxberg.

== See also ==
- List of rivers of Saxony
