= Jetscheba =

Coordinates: 51°18′N 14°29′E

Jetscheba (Upper Sorbian: Jatřob, pronounced [ˈjat.ʃɔp]) is a village in the east of the district of Bautzen, in Saxony. Part of Commerau since 1936, it has belonged to the municipality of Großdubrau since 1994. The population is 77 (2016). The village is located in Upper Lusatia and belongs to the settlement area of the Sorbs.
