= Ragow-Merz =

- Municipality
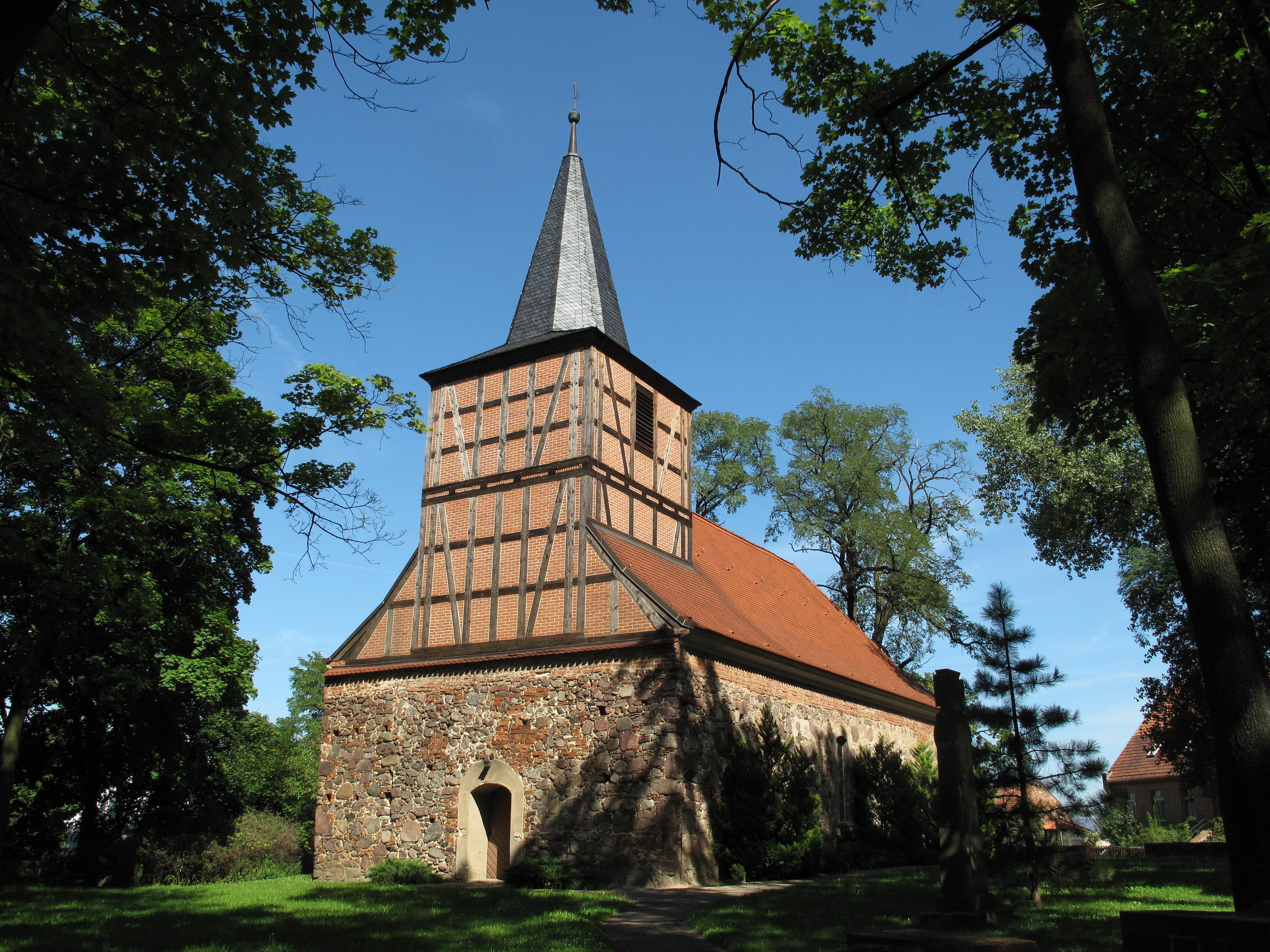
- Listed Fieldstone church in Merz

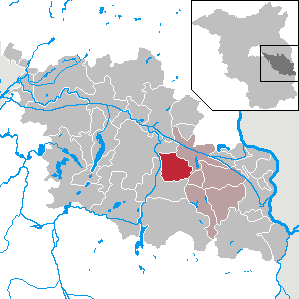
- Location of Ragow-Merz within Oder-Spree district
- Interactive map of Ragow-Merz
- Location within Germany Location within Brandenburg
- Coordinates: 52°12′00″N 14°18′00″E
- Country: Germany
- State: Brandenburg
- District: Oder-Spree
- Municipal assoc.: Schlaubetal
- Subdivisions: 2 districts

Government
  - Mayor (2024–29): Michael Schrobbach

Area
  - Total: 43.54 km^{2} (16.81 sq mi)
- Elevation: 46 m (151 ft)

Population (2025-12-31)
  - Total: 507
  - Density: 11.6/km^{2} (30.2/sq mi)
- Time zone: UTC+01:00 (CET)
  - Summer (DST): UTC+02:00 (CEST)
- Postal codes: 15848
- Dialling codes: 03366
- Vehicle registration: LOS
- Website: www.amt-schlaubetal.de

Ragow-Merz is a municipality in the Oder-Spree district, in Brandenburg, Germany.

== History ==
The municipality of Ragow-Merz was formed on 1 June 2002 by merging the municipalities of Ragow and Merz.

From 1815 to 1947, Ragow and Merz were part of the Prussian Province of Brandenburg.

After World War II, the constituent localities of Ragow-Merz were incorporated into the State of Brandenburg from 1947 to 1952 and the Bezirk Frankfurt of East Germany from 1952 to 1990. Since 1990 Ragow and Merz are again part of Brandenburg, since 2002 united as the municipality of Ragow-Merz.

== Demography ==
Development of population since 1875 within the current Boundaries (Blue Line: Population; Dotted Line: Comparison to Population development in Brandenburg state; Grey Background: Time of Nazi Germany; Red Background: Time of communist East Germany)

Ragow-Merz: Population development
within the current boundaries (2020)

Year	Pop.	±% p.a.
1875	667	—
1890	484	−2.12%
1910	459	−0.26%
1925	582	+1.60%
1933	510	−1.64%
1939	503	−0.23%
1946	660	+3.96%
1950	759	+3.56%
1964	605	−1.61%
1971	553	−1.28%
1981	478	−1.45%
1985	455	−1.23%
1989	461	+0.33%
1990	463	+0.43%
1991	464	+0.22%

Year	Pop.	±% p.a.
1992	453	−2.37%
1993	443	−2.21%
1994	463	+4.51%
1995	475	+2.59%
1996	500	+5.26%
1997	497	−0.60%
1998	526	+5.84%
1999	545	+3.61%
2000	560	+2.75%
2001	564	+0.71%
2002	573	+1.60%
2003	560	−2.27%
2004	539	−3.75%
2005	534	−0.93%
2006	510	−4.49%

Year	Pop.	±% p.a.
2007	502	−1.57%
2008	506	+0.80%
2009	494	−2.37%
2010	478	−3.24%
2011	515	+7.74%
2012	516	+0.19%
2013	510	−1.16%
2014	504	−1.18%
2015	516	+2.38%
2016	507	−1.74%
2017	514	+1.38%
2018	514	+0.00%
2019	521	+1.36%
2020	527	+1.15%
