= Lebus (Amt) =

- Amt
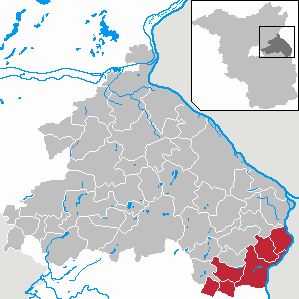
- Map of Märkisch-Oderland highlighting Lebus
- Interactive map of Lebus
- Location within Germany Location within Brandenburg
- Coordinates: 52°26′N 14°32′E
- Country: Germany
- State: Brandenburg
- District: Märkisch-Oderland
- Seat: Lebus
- Subdivisions: 5 municipalities

Area
  - Total: 155.34 km^{2} (59.98 sq mi)

Population (2025-12-31)
  - Total: 5,949
  - Density: 38.30/km^{2} (99.19/sq mi)
- Time zone: UTC+01:00 (CET)
  - Summer (DST): UTC+02:00 (CEST)
- Website: www.amt-lebus.de

Amt Lebus is an Amt ("collective municipality") in the district of Märkisch-Oderland, in Brandenburg, Germany. Its seat is in Lebus.

The Amt Lebus consists of the following municipalities:

1. Lebus
2. Podelzig
3. Reitwein
4. Treplin
5. Zeschdorf

== Demography ==
Development of Population since 1875 within the Current Boundaries (Blue Line: Population; Dotted Line: Comparison to Population Development of Brandenburg state; Grey Background: Time of Nazi rule; Red Background: Time of Communist rule)

Recent Population Development and Projections (Population Development before Census 2011 (blue line); Recent Population Development according to the Census in Germany in 2011 (blue bordered line); Official projections for 2005-2030 (yellow line); for 2017-2030 (scarlet line); for 2020-2030 (green line)

Amt Lebus: Population development
within the current boundaries (2020)

Year	Pop.	±% p.a.
1875	8,118	—
1890	7,790	−0.27%
1910	6,213	−1.12%
1925	7,467	+1.23%
1939	6,717	−0.75%
1950	7,381	+0.86%
1964	6,715	−0.67%
1971	6,620	−0.20%
1981	5,617	−1.63%

Year	Pop.	±% p.a.
1985	5,483	−0.60%
1990	5,420	−0.23%
1995	5,658	+0.86%
2000	6,710	+3.47%
2005	6,769	+0.18%
2010	6,398	−1.12%
2015	6,083	−1.00%
2020	6,098	+0.05%
2025	5,949	−0.49%
