= Am Stettiner Haff =

- Amt
- Location of Am Stettiner Haff within Vorpommern-Greifswald district
- Interactive map of Am Stettiner Haff
- Location within Germany Location within Mecklenburg-Vorpommern
- Coordinates: 53°41′N 14°05′E
- Country: Germany
- State: Mecklenburg-Vorpommern
- District: Vorpommern-Greifswald

Government
  - Mayor: Gerhard Seike

Area
  - Total: 429.23 km^{2} (165.73 sq mi)

Population (2025-12-31)
  - Total: 10,120
  - Density: 23.58/km^{2} (61.06/sq mi)
- Time zone: UTC+01:00 (CET)
  - Summer (DST): UTC+02:00 (CEST)
- Vehicle registration: VG
- Website: www.amt-am-stettiner-haff.de

Am Stettiner Haff is an Amt in the district of Vorpommern-Greifswald, in Mecklenburg-Vorpommern, Germany. The seat of the Amt is in Eggesin.

== Subdivision ==
The Amt Am Stettiner Haff consists of the following municipalities:

1. Ahlbeck
2. Altwarp
3. Eggesin
4. Grambin
5. Hintersee
6. Leopoldshagen
7. Liepgarten
8. Lübs
9. Luckow
10. Meiersberg
11. Mönkebude
12. Vogelsang-Warsin
