= Grunow-Dammendorf =

- Municipality
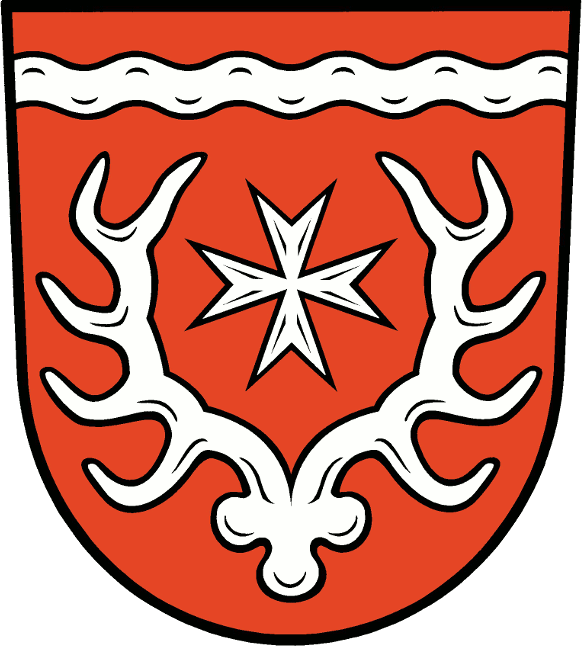
- Coat of arms

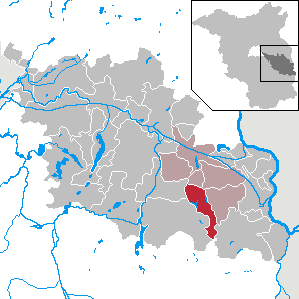
- Location of Grunow-Dammendorf within Oder-Spree district
- Interactive map of Grunow-Dammendorf
- Location within Germany Location within Brandenburg
- Coordinates: 52°08′59″N 14°25′00″E
- Country: Germany
- State: Brandenburg
- District: Oder-Spree
- Municipal assoc.: Schlaubetal
- Subdivisions: 2 districts

Government
  - Mayor (2024–29): Katharina Staar

Area
  - Total: 44.71 km^{2} (17.26 sq mi)
- Elevation: 70 m (230 ft)

Population (2025-12-31)
  - Total: 479
  - Density: 10.7/km^{2} (27.7/sq mi)
- Time zone: UTC+01:00 (CET)
  - Summer (DST): UTC+02:00 (CEST)
- Postal codes: 15299
- Dialling codes: 033655
- Vehicle registration: LOS

Grunow-Dammendorf is a municipality in the Oder-Spree district, in Brandenburg, Germany.

== History ==
The municipality of Grunow-Dammendorf was formed in 2003 by merging the municipalities of Grunow and Dammendorf.

From 1815 to 1947, Grunow and Dammendorf were part of the Prussian Province of Brandenburg.

After World War II, Grunow and Dammendorf were incorporated into the State of Brandenburg from 1947 to 1952 and the Bezirk Frankfurt of East Germany from 1952 to 1990. Since 1990, Grunow and Dammendorf are again part of Brandenburg, since 2003 united as Grunow-Dammendorf.

== Geography ==
=== Division of the municipality ===
- Dammendorf
- Grunow

== Demography ==
Development of Population since 1875 within the Current Boundaries (Blue Line: Population; Dotted Line: Comparison to Population Development of Brandenburg state; Grey Background: Time of Nazi rule; Red Background: Time of Communist rule)

Grunow-Dammendorf: Population development
within the current boundaries (2020)

Year	Pop.	±% p.a.
1875	601	—
1890	565	−0.41%
1910	539	−0.24%
1925	530	−0.11%
1933	544	+0.33%
1939	499	−1.43%
1946	720	+5.38%
1950	753	+1.13%
1964	671	−0.82%
1971	662	−0.19%
1981	570	−1.49%
1985	539	−1.39%
1989	526	−0.61%
1990	531	+0.95%
1991	515	−3.01%

Year	Pop.	±% p.a.
1992	502	−2.52%
1993	510	+1.59%
1994	509	−0.20%
1995	529	+3.93%
1996	547	+3.40%
1997	565	+3.29%
1998	576	+1.95%
1999	583	+1.22%
2000	591	+1.37%
2001	590	−0.17%
2002	600	+1.69%
2003	598	−0.33%
2004	607	+1.51%
2005	605	−0.33%
2006	587	−2.98%

Year	Pop.	±% p.a.
2007	588	+0.17%
2008	590	+0.34%
2009	570	−3.39%
2010	558	−2.11%
2011	532	−4.66%
2012	525	−1.32%
2013	519	−1.14%
2014	509	−1.93%
2015	501	−1.57%
2016	502	+0.20%
2017	499	−0.60%
2018	508	+1.80%
2019	510	+0.39%
2020	527	+3.33%

== See also ==
- Grunow (disambiguation)
