= Lübs =

- Municipality
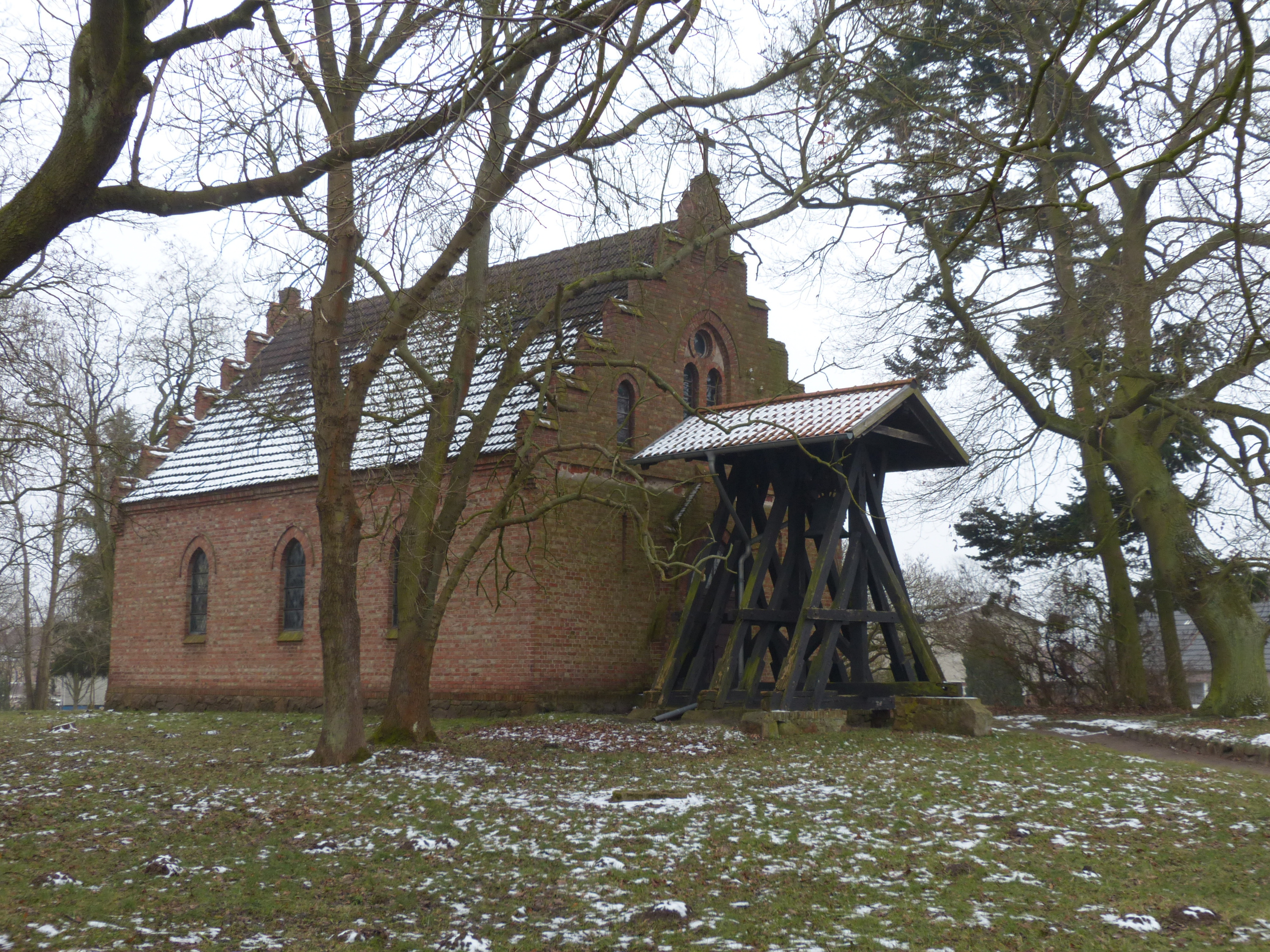
- Village church in Lübs

- Location of Lübs within Vorpommern-Greifswald district
- Interactive map of Lübs
- Location within Germany Location within Mecklenburg-Vorpommern
- Coordinates: 53°44′N 13°53′E
- Country: Germany
- State: Mecklenburg-Vorpommern
- District: Vorpommern-Greifswald
- Municipal assoc.: Am Stettiner Haff

Government
  - Mayor: Rainer Jaeschke

Area
  - Total: 30.2 km^{2} (11.7 sq mi)
- Elevation: 12 m (39 ft)

Population (2025-12-31)
  - Total: 303
  - Density: 10.0/km^{2} (26.0/sq mi)
- Time zone: UTC+01:00 (CET)
  - Summer (DST): UTC+02:00 (CEST)
- Postal codes: 17379
- Dialling codes: 039771, 039777
- Vehicle registration: VG
- Website: www.amt-am-stettiner-haff.de

Lübs (German pronunciation: [lʏps]) is a municipality in the Vorpommern-Greifswald district, in Mecklenburg-Vorpommern, Germany.

== History ==
From 1648 to 1720, Lübs was part of Swedish Pomerania. From 1720 to 1945, it was part of the Prussian Province of Pomerania, from 1945 to 1952 of the State of Mecklenburg-Vorpommern, from 1952 to 1990 of the Bezirk Neubrandenburg of East Germany and since 1990 again of Mecklenburg-Vorpommern.
