= Schlaubetal (Amt) =

- Amt
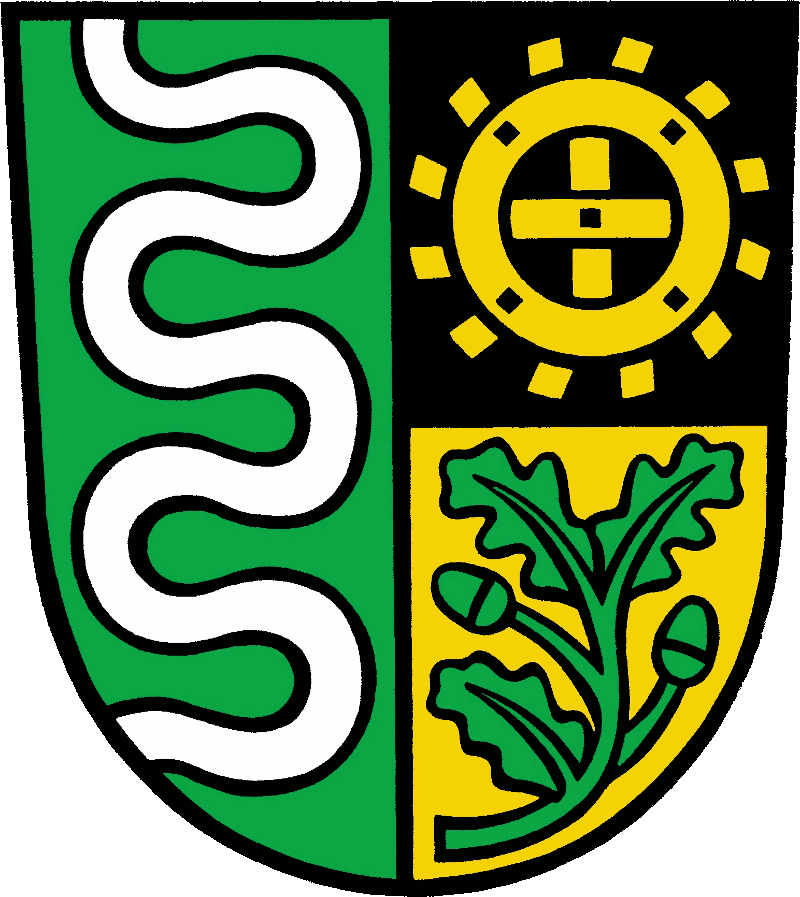
- Coat of arms

- Map of Oder-Spree highlighting Schlaubetal
- Interactive map of Schlaubetal
- Location within Germany Location within Brandenburg
- Coordinates: 52°15′N 14°26′E
- Country: Germany
- State: Brandenburg
- District: Oder-Spree
- Seat: Müllrose
- Subdivisions: 6 municipalities

Area
  - Total: 297.56 km^{2} (114.89 sq mi)

Population (2025-12-31)
  - Total: 9,721
  - Density: 32.67/km^{2} (84.61/sq mi)
- Time zone: UTC+01:00 (CET)
  - Summer (DST): UTC+02:00 (CEST)
- Website: www.amt-schlaubetal.de

Amt Schlaubetal is an Amt ("collective municipality") in the district of Oder-Spree, in Brandenburg, Germany. Its seat is in Müllrose. Its name refers to the river Schlaube.

The Amt Schlaubetal consists of the following municipalities:

1. Grunow-Dammendorf
2. Mixdorf
3. Müllrose
4. Ragow-Merz
5. Schlaubetal
6. Siehdichum

== Demography ==
Development of Population since 1875 within the Current Boundaries (Blue Line: Population; Dotted Line: Comparison to Population Development of Brandenburg state; Grey Background: Time of Nazi rule; Red Background: Time of Communist rule)

Recent Population Development and Projections (Population Development before Census 2011 (blue line); Recent Population Development according to the Census in Germany in 2011 (blue bordered line); Official projections for 2005-2030 (yellow line); for 2020-2030 (green line); for 2017-2030 (scarlet line)

Amt Schlaubetal: Population development
within the current boundaries (2020)

Year	Pop.	±% p.a.
1875	7,161	—
1890	6,769	−0.37%
1910	6,460	−0.23%
1925	7,105	+0.64%
1933	7,134	+0.05%
1939	6,789	−0.82%
1946	8,366	+3.03%
1950	8,635	+0.79%
1964	7,324	−1.17%
1971	7,225	−0.19%

Year	Pop.	±% p.a.
1981	6,627	−0.86%
1985	6,658	+0.12%
1990	6,495	−0.49%
1995	7,443	+2.76%
2000	10,048	+6.19%
2005	10,368	+0.63%
2010	9,971	−0.78%
2015	9,826	−0.29%
2020	9,979	+0.31%
2025	9,721	−0.52%
