= Grünow, Mecklenburg-Vorpommern =

Grünow
- Municipality
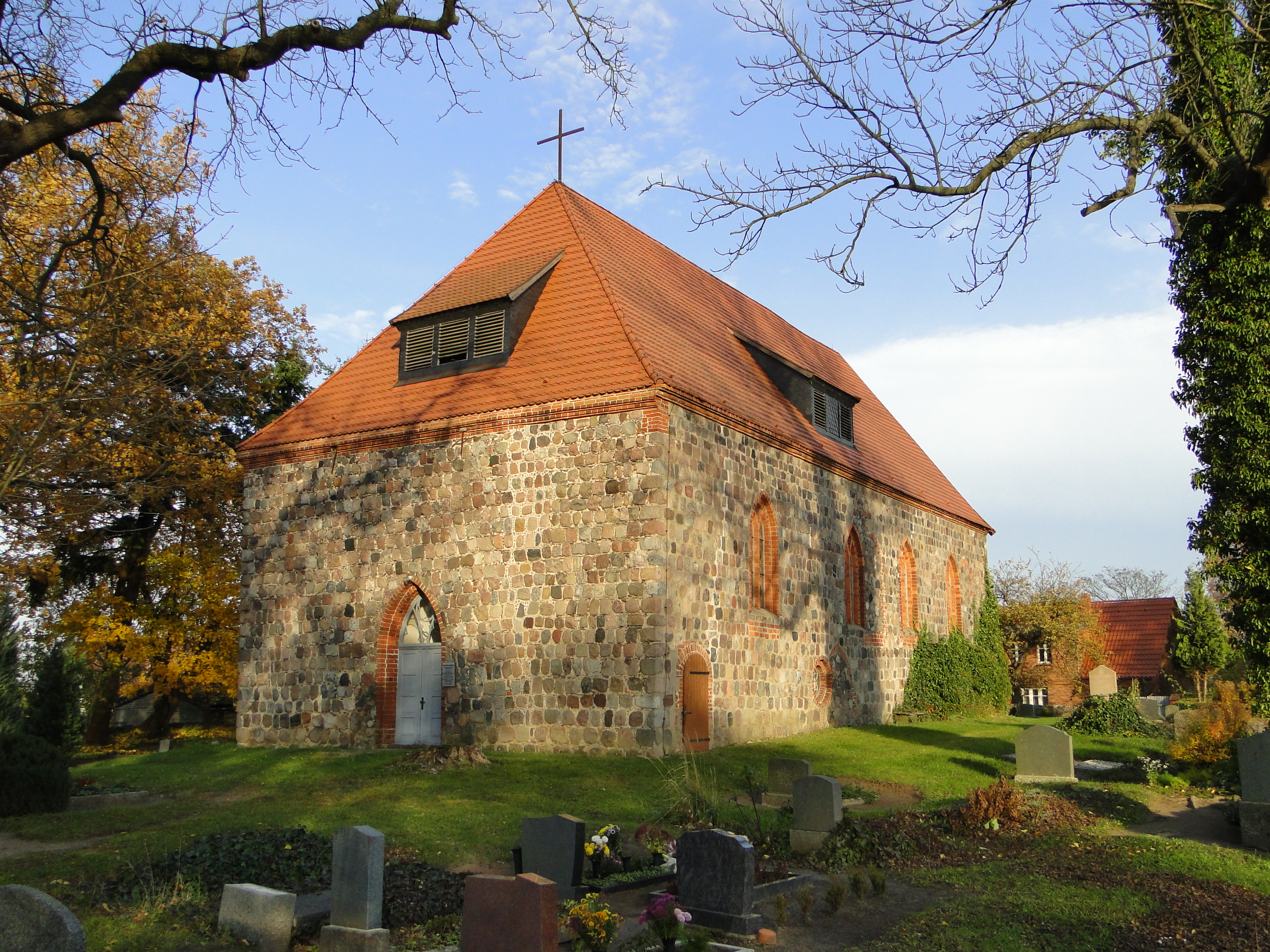
- Medieval church in Grünow

- Location of Grünow within Mecklenburgische Seenplatte district
- Interactive map of Grünow
- Location within Germany Location within Mecklenburg-Vorpommern
- Coordinates: 53°20′N 13°19′E
- Country: Germany
- State: Mecklenburg-Vorpommern
- District: Mecklenburgische Seenplatte
- Municipal assoc.: Neustrelitz-Land

Government
  - Mayor: Lothar Niendorf

Area
  - Total: 23.19 km^{2} (8.95 sq mi)
- Elevation: 105 m (344 ft)

Population (2025-12-31)
  - Total: 308
  - Density: 13.3/km^{2} (34.4/sq mi)
- Time zone: UTC+01:00 (CET)
  - Summer (DST): UTC+02:00 (CEST)
- Postal codes: 17237
- Dialling codes: 039821
- Vehicle registration: MST
- Website: www.amtneustrelitz-land.de

Grünow is a municipality in the Mecklenburgische Seenplatte district, in Mecklenburg-Vorpommern, Germany.

== See also ==
- Grunow (disambiguation)
