= Klein Priebus =

Human settlement in Germany

- Ortsteil of Krauschwitz
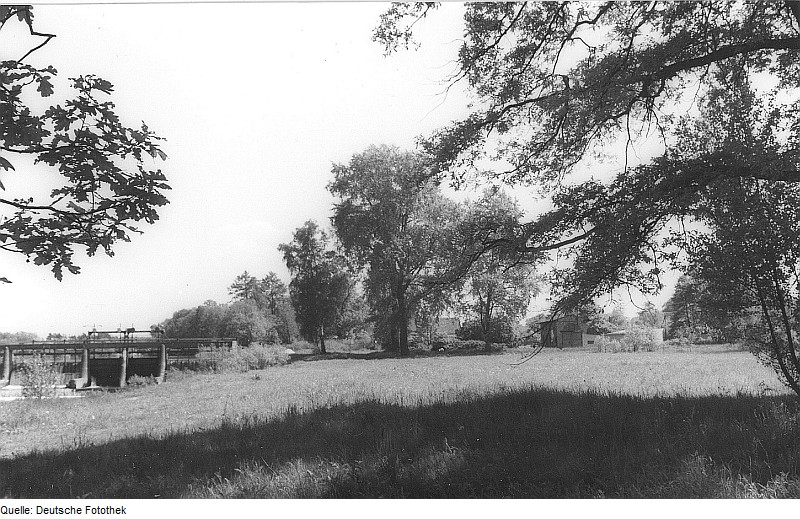
- View of the village from the 1980s
- Interactive map of Klein Priebus
- Location within Germany Location within Saxony
- Coordinates: 51°27′N 14°57′E
- Country: Germany
- State: Saxony
- District: Görlitz
- Municipality: Krauschwitz
- Time zone: UTC+01:00 (CET)
  - Summer (DST): UTC+02:00 (CEST)

Klein Priebus (Sorbian: Přibuzk; Polish: Mały Przewóz) is a village in the municipality of Krauschwitz in Saxony in eastern Germany, opposite of the Polish village of Przewóz.

In 1842, the village had a population of 130. Before World War II the village was located in the Province of Lower Silesia.
