= Podelzig =

- Municipality
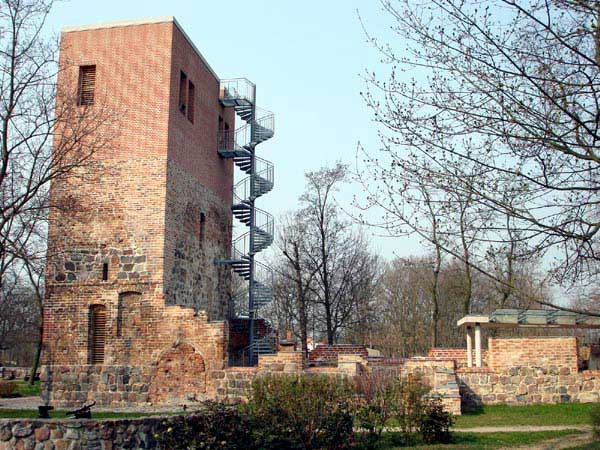
- Remains of village church

- Coat of arms

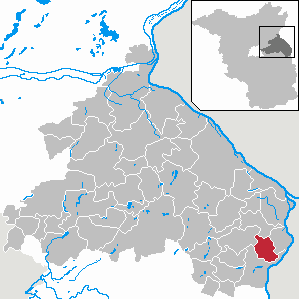
- Location of Podelzig within Märkisch-Oderland district
- Interactive map of Podelzig
- Location within Germany Location within Brandenburg
- Coordinates: 52°28′00″N 14°31′59″E
- Country: Germany
- State: Brandenburg
- District: Märkisch-Oderland
- Municipal assoc.: Lebus

Government
  - Mayor (2024–29): Thomas Mix

Area
  - Total: 25.14 km^{2} (9.71 sq mi)
- Elevation: 48 m (157 ft)

Population (2025-12-31)
  - Total: 875
  - Density: 34.8/km^{2} (90.1/sq mi)
- Time zone: UTC+01:00 (CET)
  - Summer (DST): UTC+02:00 (CEST)
- Postal codes: 15326
- Dialling codes: 033601
- Vehicle registration: MOL
- Website: Kirche Podelzig

Podelzig is a municipality in the district Märkisch-Oderland, in Brandenburg, Germany.

== Demography ==
Development of Population since 1875 within the Current Boundaries (Blue Line: Population; Dotted Line: Comparison to Population Development of Brandenburg state; Grey Background: Time of Nazi rule; Red Background: Time of Communist rule)

Podelzig: Population development
within the current boundaries (2013)

Year	Pop.	±% p.a.
1875	1,922	—
1890	1,675	−0.91%
1910	1,306	−1.24%
1925	1,415	+0.54%
1933	1,350	−0.59%
1939	1,172	−2.33%
1946	894	−3.79%
1950	1,199	+7.61%
1964	1,230	+0.18%
1971	1,230	+0.00%
1981	1,038	−1.68%
1985	993	−1.10%
1989	916	−2.00%
1990	923	+0.76%
1991	909	−1.52%
1992	884	−2.75%
1993	877	−0.79%
1994	877	+0.00%
1995	899	+2.51%
1996	890	−1.00%

Year	Pop.	±% p.a.
1997	900	+1.12%
1998	935	+3.89%
1999	960	+2.67%
2000	1,000	+4.17%
2001	1,000	+0.00%
2002	1,005	+0.50%
2003	1,010	+0.50%
2004	1,005	−0.50%
2005	992	−1.29%
2006	999	+0.71%
2007	1,016	+1.70%
2008	988	−2.76%
2009	955	−3.34%
2010	951	−0.42%
2011	908	−4.52%
2012	887	−2.31%
2013	879	−0.90%
2014	880	+0.11%
2015	855	−2.84%
2016	852	−0.35%
