= Zeschdorf =

- Municipality
- Coat of arms

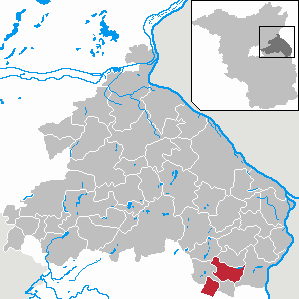
- Location of Zeschdorf within Märkisch-Oderland district
- Interactive map of Zeschdorf
- Location within Germany Location within Brandenburg
- Coordinates: 52°25′41″N 14°26′39″E
- Country: Germany
- State: Brandenburg
- District: Märkisch-Oderland
- Municipal assoc.: Lebus
- Subdivisions: 3 Ortsteile

Government
  - Mayor (2024–29): Helke Gertrud Baltz

Area
  - Total: 40.32 km^{2} (15.57 sq mi)
- Elevation: 54 m (177 ft)

Population (2025-12-31)
  - Total: 1,241
  - Density: 30.78/km^{2} (79.72/sq mi)
- Time zone: UTC+01:00 (CET)
  - Summer (DST): UTC+02:00 (CEST)
- Postal codes: 15326
- Dialling codes: 033602, 033470, 033602
- Vehicle registration: MOL
- Website: Gemeinde Zeschdorf

Zeschdorf is a municipality in the district Märkisch-Oderland, in Brandenburg, Germany. It is administered by the Amt Lebus, based in the nearby town of Lebus. The municipality lies approximately 70 kilometers east of Berlin and 11 kilometers west of Frankfurt.

== Demography ==
Development of population since 1875 within the current boundaries (Blue line: Population; Dotted line: Comparison to population development of Brandenburg state; Grey background: Time of Nazi rule; Red background: Time of communist rule)

Zeschdorf: Population development
within the current boundaries (2013)

Year	Pop.	±% p.a.
1875	1,440	—
1890	1,308	−0.64%
1910	1,098	−0.87%
1925	1,236	+0.79%
1933	1,040	−2.14%
1939	1,054	+0.22%
1946	1,420	+4.35%
1950	1,725	+4.98%
1964	1,588	−0.59%
1971	1,533	−0.50%
1981	1,298	−1.65%
1985	1,290	−0.15%
1989	1,276	−0.27%
1990	1,272	−0.31%
1991	1,207	−5.11%
1992	1,196	−0.91%
1993	1,198	+0.17%
1994	1,199	+0.08%
1995	1,200	+0.08%
1996	1,246	+3.83%

Year	Pop.	±% p.a.
1997	1,336	+7.22%
1998	1,356	+1.50%
1999	1,401	+3.32%
2000	1,407	+0.43%
2001	1,454	+3.34%
2002	1,456	+0.14%
2003	1,447	−0.62%
2004	1,451	+0.28%
2005	1,451	+0.00%
2006	1,410	−2.83%
2007	1,402	−0.57%
2008	1,373	−2.07%
2009	1,364	−0.66%
2010	1,347	−1.25%
2011	1,267	−5.94%
2012	1,252	−1.18%
2013	1,247	−0.40%
2014	1,225	−1.76%
2015	1,242	+1.39%
2016	1,250	+0.64%
