= Schlaubetal =

- Municipality
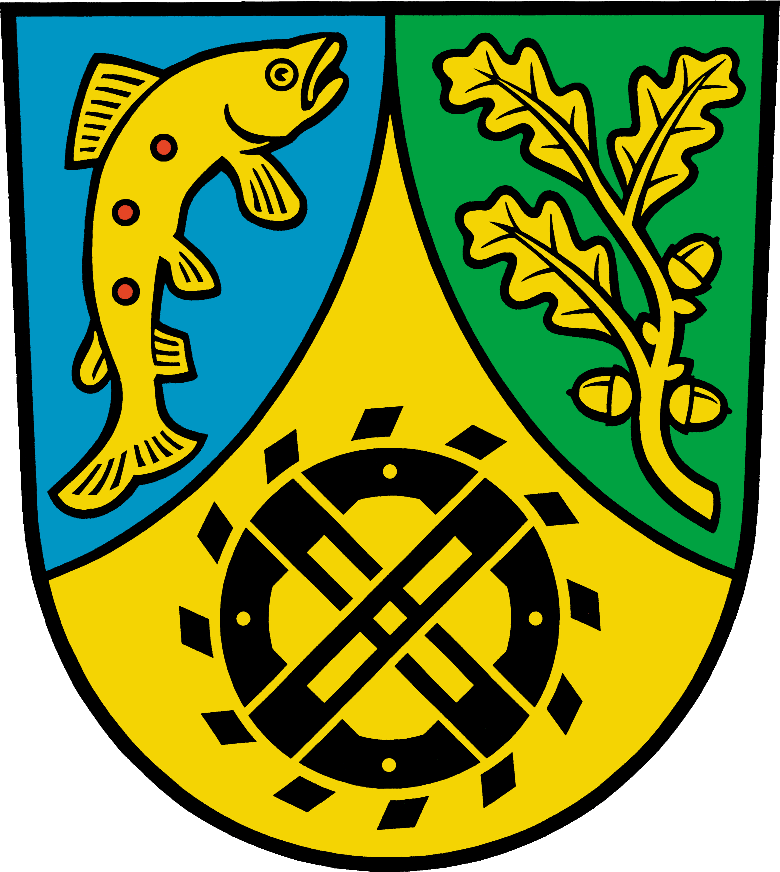
- Coat of arms

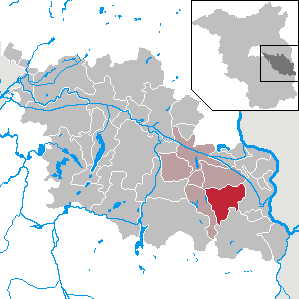
- Location of Schlaubetal within Oder-Spree district
- Interactive map of Schlaubetal
- Location within Germany Location within Brandenburg
- Coordinates: 52°07′00″N 14°30′00″E
- Country: Germany
- State: Brandenburg
- District: Oder-Spree
- Municipal assoc.: Schlaubetal
- Subdivisions: 3 districts

Government
  - Mayor (2024–29): Thomas Dittrich

Area
  - Total: 52.34 km^{2} (20.21 sq mi)
- Elevation: 118 m (387 ft)

Population (2025-12-31)
  - Total: 1,765
  - Density: 33.72/km^{2} (87.34/sq mi)
- Time zone: UTC+01:00 (CET)
  - Summer (DST): UTC+02:00 (CEST)
- Postal codes: 15890
- Dialling codes: 033654
- Vehicle registration: LOS

Schlaubetal is a municipality in the Oder-Spree district, in Brandenburg, Germany.

== History ==
The municipality of Schlaubetal was formed on 26 October 2003 by merging the municipalities of Bremsdorf, Fünfeichen und Kieselwitz.

From 1815 to 1947, Bremsdorf, Fünfeisen and Kieselwitz were part of the Prussian Province of Brandenburg.

After World War II, the constituent localities of Schlaubetal were incorporated into the State of Brandenburg from 1947 to 1952 and the Bezirk Frankfurt of East Germany from 1952 to 1990. Since 1990 they are again part of Brandenburg, since 2003 united as the municipality of Schlaubetal.

== Demography ==
Development of population since 1875 within the current Boundaries (Blue Line: Population; Dotted Line: Comparison to Population development in Brandenburg state; Grey Background: Time of Nazi Germany; Red Background: Time of communist East Germany)

Schlaubetal: Population development
within the current boundaries (2020)

Year	Pop.	±% p.a.
1875	1,312	—
1890	1,330	+0.09%
1910	1,228	−0.40%
1925	1,322	+0.49%
1933	1,404	+0.76%
1939	1,282	−1.50%
1946	1,631	+3.50%
1950	1,531	−1.57%
1964	1,304	−1.14%
1971	1,288	−0.18%
1981	1,253	−0.28%
1985	1,297	+0.87%
1989	1,359	+1.17%
1990	1,339	−1.47%
1991	1,328	−0.82%

Year	Pop.	±% p.a.
1992	1,325	−0.23%
1993	1,304	−1.58%
1994	1,353	+3.76%
1995	1,429	+5.62%
1996	1,503	+5.18%
1997	1,606	+6.85%
1998	1,748	+8.84%
1999	1,918	+9.73%
2000	1,980	+3.23%
2001	2,002	+1.11%
2002	2,046	+2.20%
2003	2,056	+0.49%
2004	2,025	−1.51%
2005	1,999	−1.28%
2006	1,988	−0.55%

Year	Pop.	±% p.a.
2007	1,977	−0.55%
2008	1,963	−0.71%
2009	1,928	−1.78%
2010	1,920	−0.41%
2011	1,890	−1.56%
2012	1,853	−1.96%
2013	1,849	−0.22%
2014	1,828	−1.14%
2015	1,815	−0.71%
2016	1,841	+1.43%
2017	1,848	+0.38%
2018	1,840	−0.43%
2019	1,814	−1.41%
2020	1,844	+1.65%
