= Jacobsdorf =

- Municipality
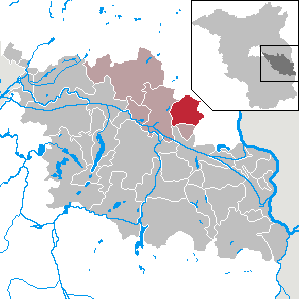
- Location of Jacobsdorf within Oder-Spree district
- Interactive map of Jacobsdorf
- Location within Germany Location within Brandenburg
- Coordinates: 52°20′N 14°21′E
- Country: Germany
- State: Brandenburg
- District: Oder-Spree
- Municipal assoc.: Odervorland
- Subdivisions: 3 districts

Government
  - Mayor (2024–29): Peter Stumm

Area
  - Total: 50.26 km^{2} (19.41 sq mi)
- Elevation: 65 m (213 ft)

Population (2025-12-31)
  - Total: 1,793
  - Density: 35.67/km^{2} (92.40/sq mi)
- Time zone: UTC+01:00 (CET)
  - Summer (DST): UTC+02:00 (CEST)
- Postal codes: 15236
- Dialling codes: 033608
- Vehicle registration: LOS
- Website: www.jacobsdorf.de

Jacobsdorf is a municipality in the Oder-Spree district, in Brandenburg, Germany.

== Demography ==
Development of population since 1875 within the current Boundaries (Blue Line: Population; Dotted Line: Comparison to Population development in Brandenburg state; Grey Background: Time of Nazi Germany; Red Background: Time of communist East Germany)

Jacobsdorf: Population development
within the current boundaries (2013)

Year	Pop.	±% p.a.
1875	1,938	—
1890	1,767	−0.61%
1910	1,909	+0.39%
1925	1,886	−0.08%
1933	1,859	−0.18%
1939	1,808	−0.46%
1946	2,499	+4.73%
1950	2,530	+0.31%
1964	2,110	−1.29%
1971	2,092	−0.12%
1981	1,648	−2.36%
1985	1,532	−1.81%
1989	1,516	−0.26%
1990	1,488	−1.85%
1991	1,413	−5.04%
1992	1,414	+0.07%
1993	1,426	+0.85%
1994	1,457	+2.17%
1995	1,496	+2.68%
1996	1,599	+6.89%

Year	Pop.	±% p.a.
1997	1,750	+9.44%
1998	1,871	+6.91%
1999	1,915	+2.35%
2000	1,943	+1.46%
2001	2,018	+3.86%
2002	2,051	+1.64%
2003	2,005	−2.24%
2004	1,980	−1.25%
2005	1,987	+0.35%
2006	1,953	−1.71%
2007	1,924	−1.48%
2008	1,912	−0.62%
2009	1,935	+1.20%
2010	1,880	−2.84%
2011	1,870	−0.53%
2012	1,869	−0.05%
2013	1,858	−0.59%
2014	1,876	+0.97%
2015	1,863	−0.69%
2016	1,887	+1.29%
