= Reitwein =

- Municipality

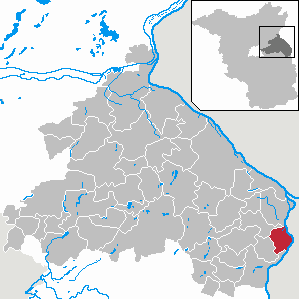
- Location of Reitwein within Märkisch-Oderland district
- Interactive map of Reitwein
- Location within Germany Location within Brandenburg
- Coordinates: 52°30′00″N 14°34′59″E
- Country: Germany
- State: Brandenburg
- District: Märkisch-Oderland
- Municipal assoc.: Lebus

Government
  - Mayor (2024–29): Detlef Schieberle

Area
  - Total: 23.80 km^{2} (9.19 sq mi)
- Elevation: 13 m (43 ft)

Population (2025-12-31)
  - Total: 462
  - Density: 19.4/km^{2} (50.3/sq mi)
- Time zone: UTC+01:00 (CET)
  - Summer (DST): UTC+02:00 (CEST)
- Postal codes: 15328
- Dialling codes: 033601
- Vehicle registration: MOL

Reitwein is a municipality in the district Märkisch-Oderland, in Brandenburg, in eastern Germany, on the border with Poland. It is part of the historic Lubusz Land.

== History ==
There was an early medieval stronghold in Rytwiny, as it was known in Polish, predating the foundation of Poland, which then became a Polish defensive stronghold against a possible German invasion from the west. Following the fragmentation of Poland into smaller provincial duchies, it formed part of the duchies of Silesia, Greater Poland, Lubusz and Legnica, and afterwards passed to the Margraviate of Brandenburg and Kingdom of Prussia.

== Demography ==
Development of population since 1875 within the current boundaries (Blue line: Population; Dotted line: Comparison to population development of Brandenburg state; Grey background: Time of Nazi rule; Red background: Time of communist rule)

Reitwein: Population development
within the current boundaries (2013)

Year	Pop.	±% p.a.
1875	957	—
1890	1,006	+0.33%
1910	831	−0.95%
1925	909	+0.60%
1933	857	−0.73%
1939	835	−0.43%
1946	859	+0.41%
1950	1,100	+6.38%
1964	788	−2.35%
1971	775	−0.24%
1981	577	−2.91%
1985	525	−2.33%
1989	507	−0.87%
1990	509	+0.39%

Year	Pop.	±% p.a.
1991	501	−1.57%
1992	497	−0.80%
1993	499	+0.40%
1994	484	−3.01%
1995	475	−1.86%
1996	493	+3.79%
1997	517	+4.87%
1998	535	+3.48%
1999	535	+0.00%
2000	534	−0.19%
2001	544	+1.87%
2002	545	+0.18%
2003	538	−1.28%
2004	526	−2.23%

Year	Pop.	±% p.a.
2005	535	+1.71%
2006	530	−0.93%
2007	505	−4.72%
2008	489	−3.17%
2009	491	+0.41%
2010	503	+2.44%
2011	482	−4.17%
2012	477	−1.04%
2013	454	−4.82%
2014	466	+2.64%
2015	463	−0.64%
2016	459	−0.86%

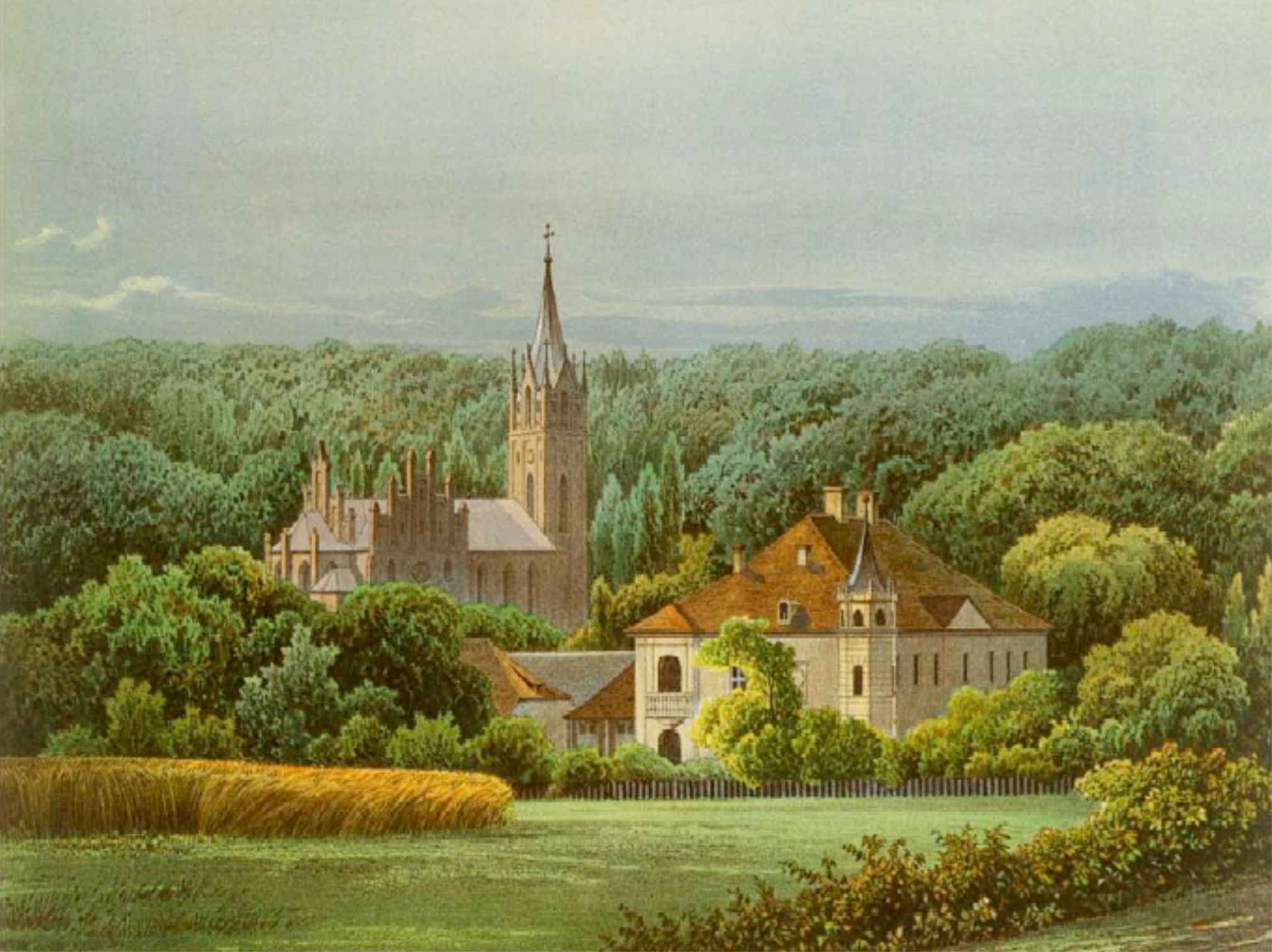
Stülerchurch with palace Reitwein, around 1860, edition by Alexander Duncker
