= Hintersee, Mecklenburg-Vorpommern =

Hintersee
- Municipality
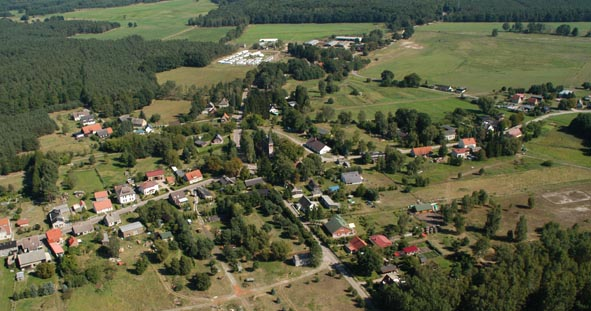
- Aerial view of Hintersee

- Location of Hintersee within Vorpommern-Greifswald district
- Interactive map of Hintersee
- Location within Germany Location within Mecklenburg-Vorpommern
- Coordinates: 53°37′N 14°16′E
- Country: Germany
- State: Mecklenburg-Vorpommern
- District: Vorpommern-Greifswald
- Municipal assoc.: Am Stettiner Haff

Government
  - Mayor: Peggy Kundschaft

Area
  - Total: 44.42 km^{2} (17.15 sq mi)
- Elevation: 14 m (46 ft)

Population (2025-12-31)
  - Total: 293
  - Density: 6.60/km^{2} (17.1/sq mi)
- Time zone: UTC+01:00 (CET)
  - Summer (DST): UTC+02:00 (CEST)
- Postal codes: 17375
- Dialling codes: 039776
- Vehicle registration: VG
- Website: www.hintersee-online.de

Hintersee is a municipality in the Vorpommern-Greifswald district, in Mecklenburg-Vorpommern, Germany. It is located near the border with Poland.

== History ==
From 1648 to 1720, Hintersee was part of Swedish Pomerania. From 1720 to 1945, it was part of the Prussian Province of Pomerania, from 1945 to 1952 of the State of Mecklenburg-Vorpommern, from 1952 to 1990 of the Bezirk Neubrandenburg of East Germany and since 1990 again of Mecklenburg-Vorpommern.
