= Siehdichum =

- Municipality
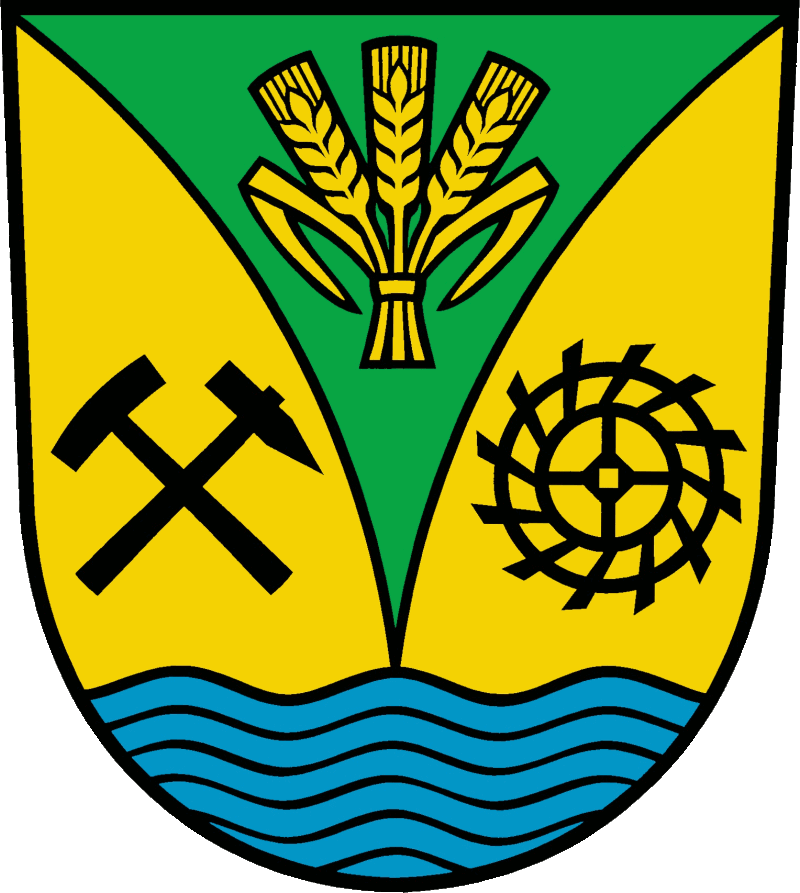
- Coat of arms

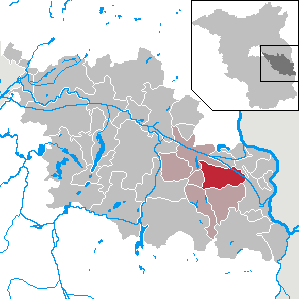
- Location of Siehdichum within Oder-Spree district
- Interactive map of Siehdichum
- Location within Germany Location within Brandenburg
- Coordinates: 52°11′40″N 14°32′0″E
- Country: Germany
- State: Brandenburg
- District: Oder-Spree
- Municipal assoc.: Schlaubetal
- Subdivisions: 3 districts

Government
  - Mayor (2024–29): Robert Meus

Area
  - Total: 73.00 km^{2} (28.19 sq mi)
- Elevation: 51–74 m (167–243 ft)

Population (2025-12-31)
  - Total: 1,444
  - Density: 19.78/km^{2} (51.23/sq mi)
- Time zone: UTC+01:00 (CET)
  - Summer (DST): UTC+02:00 (CEST)
- Postal codes: 15890
- Dialling codes: 033653/4/6
- Vehicle registration: LOS

Siehdichum is a municipality in the Oder-Spree district, in Brandenburg, Germany. The name literally means "have a look around you".

== History ==
The municipality of Siehdichum was formed in 2003 by merging the municipalities of Pohlitz, Rießen and Schernsdorf.

From 1815 to 1947, the constituent localities of Siehdichum were part of the Prussian Province of Brandenburg.

After World War II, Pohlitz, Rießen and Schernsdorf were incorporated into the State of Brandenburg from 1947 to 1952 and the Bezirk Frankfurt of East Germany from 1952 to 1990. Since 1990, they are again part of Brandenburg, since 2003 united as the municipality of Siehdichum.

== Demography ==
Development of population since 1875 within the current Boundaries (Blue Line: Population; Dotted Line: Comparison to Population development in Brandenburg state; Grey Background: Time of Nazi Germany; Red Background: Time of communist East Germany)

Siehdichum: Population development
within the current boundaries (2020)

Year	Pop.	±% p.a.
1875	1,201	—
1890	1,247	+0.25%
1910	1,046	−0.87%
1925	1,218	+1.02%
1933	1,139	−0.83%
1939	1,082	−0.85%
1946	1,452	+4.29%
1950	1,427	−0.43%
1964	1,157	−1.49%
1971	1,026	−1.70%
1981	892	−1.39%
1985	846	−1.31%
1989	864	+0.53%
1990	849	−1.74%
1991	864	+1.77%

Year	Pop.	±% p.a.
1992	876	+1.39%
1993	902	+2.97%
1994	979	+8.54%
1995	1,032	+5.41%
1996	1,163	+12.69%
1997	1,425	+22.53%
1998	1,520	+6.67%
1999	1,584	+4.21%
2000	1,677	+5.87%
2001	1,742	+3.88%
2002	1,763	+1.21%
2003	1,779	+0.91%
2004	1,788	+0.51%
2005	1,773	−0.84%
2006	1,765	−0.45%

Year	Pop.	±% p.a.
2007	1,744	−1.19%
2008	1,703	−2.35%
2009	1,658	−2.64%
2010	1,616	−2.53%
2011	1,566	−3.09%
2012	1,564	−0.13%
2013	1,542	−1.41%
2014	1,535	−0.45%
2015	1,522	−0.85%
2016	1,525	+0.20%
2017	1,553	+1.84%
2018	1,531	−1.42%
2019	1,516	−0.98%
2020	1,535	+1.25%
