= Schenkendöbern =

Municipality in Brandenburg, Germany

Schenkendöbern/Derbno
- Municipality
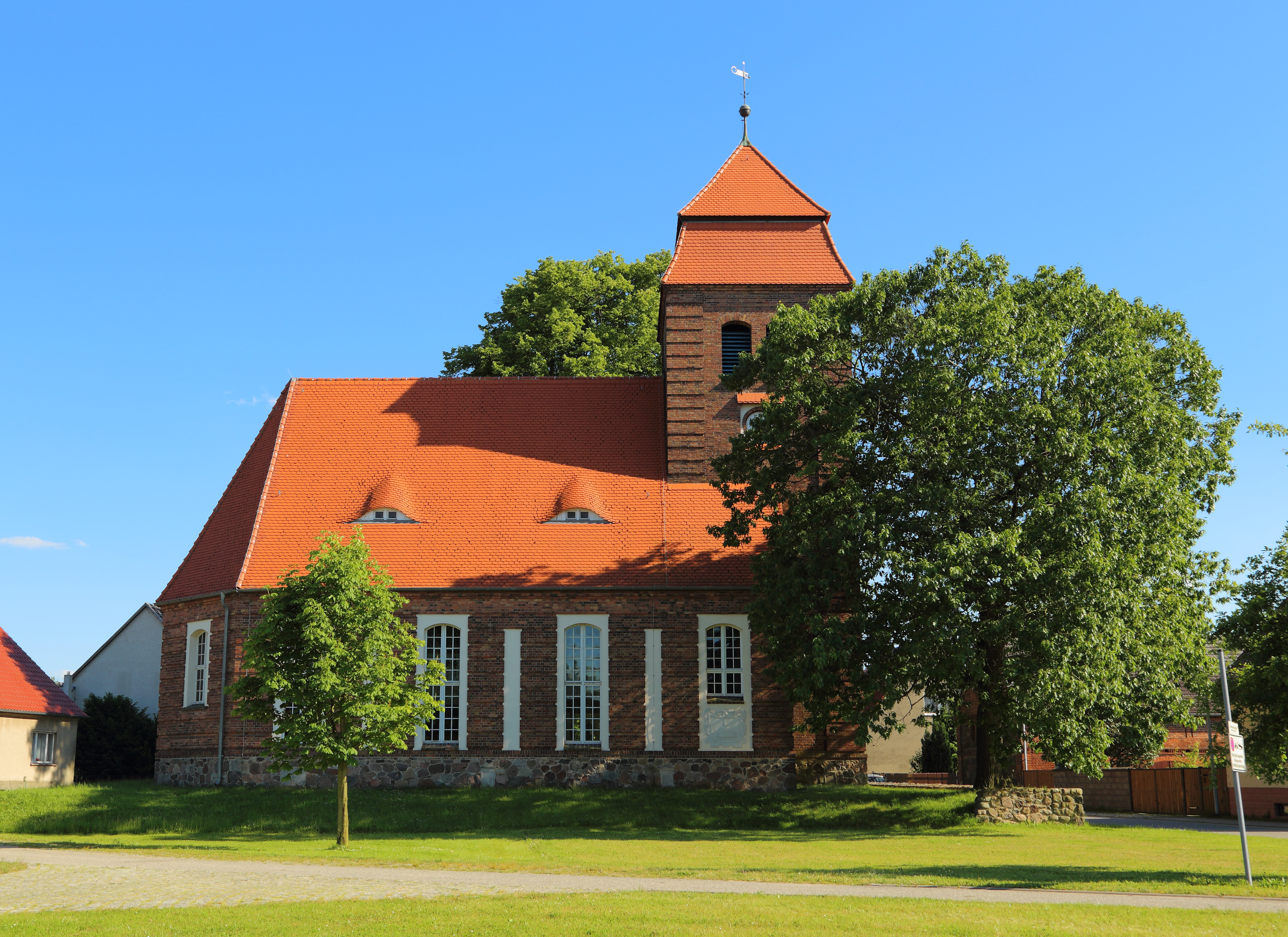
- Church in Pinnow

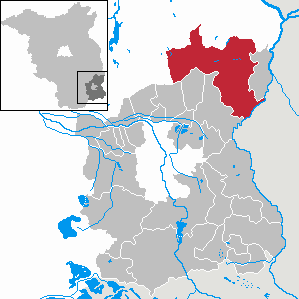
- Location of Schenkendöbern/Derbno within Spree-Neiße district
- Interactive map of Schenkendöbern/Derbno
- Location within Germany Location within Brandenburg
- Coordinates: 51°56′01″N 14°37′20″E
- Country: Germany
- State: Brandenburg
- District: Spree-Neiße

Government
  - Mayor (2019–27): Ralph Homeister

Area
  - Total: 213.89 km^{2} (82.58 sq mi)
- Elevation: 51 m (167 ft)

Population (2025-12-31)
  - Total: 3,313
  - Density: 15.49/km^{2} (40.12/sq mi)
- Time zone: UTC+01:00 (CET)
  - Summer (DST): UTC+02:00 (CEST)
- Postal codes: 03172
- Dialling codes: 03561, 035691, 035692, 035693
- Vehicle registration: SPN
- Website: www.schenkendoebern.de

Schenkendöbern (German) or Derbno (Lower Sorbian) is a municipality in the district of Spree-Neiße, in Lower Lusatia, Brandenburg, Germany.

The first place in Schenkendöbern to be mentioned in print was the village of Krayne in 1465.

Parts of the municipality are in the Sorbian settlement area; in those areas, the German and Lower Sorbian languages have equal status.

== History ==
From 1815 to 1947, Schenkendöbern was part of the Prussian Province of Brandenburg. From 1952 to 1990, it was part of the Bezirk Cottbus of East Germany.

== Demography ==
Development of population since 1875 within the current Boundaries (Blue Line: Population; Dotted Line: Comparison to Population development in Brandenburg state; Grey Background: Time of Nazi Germany; Red Background: Time of communist East Germany)

Recent Population Development and Projections (Population Development before Census 2011 (blue line); Recent Population Development according to the Census in Germany in 2011 (blue bordered line); Official projections for 2005-2030 (yellow line); for 2017-2030 (scarlet line); for 2020-2030 (green line)

Schenkendöbern: Population development
within the current boundaries (2020)

Year	Pop.	±% p.a.
1875	4,674	—
1890	4,259	−0.62%
1910	4,286	+0.03%
1925	4,459	+0.26%
1939	4,314	−0.24%
1950	6,484	+3.77%
1964	5,225	−1.53%

Year	Pop.	±% p.a.
1971	4,791	−1.23%
1981	4,170	−1.38%
1985	4,037	−0.81%
1990	3,904	−0.67%
1995	4,120	+1.08%
2000	4,545	+1.98%
2005	4,264	−1.27%

Year	Pop.	±% p.a.
2010	3,942	−1.56%
2015	3,662	−1.46%
2016	3,613	−1.34%
2017	3,613	+0.00%
2018	3,599	−0.39%
2019	3,572	−0.75%
2020	3,543	−0.81%
