= Carmzow-Wallmow =

- Municipality
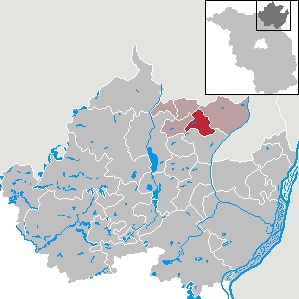
- Location of Carmzow-Wallmow within Uckermark district
- Interactive map of Carmzow-Wallmow
- Location within Germany Location within Brandenburg
- Coordinates: 53°22′N 14°04′E
- Country: Germany
- State: Brandenburg
- District: Uckermark
- Municipal assoc.: Brüssow (Uckermark)

Government
  - Mayor (2024–29): Jörn Muranko

Area
  - Total: 31.86 km^{2} (12.30 sq mi)
- Elevation: 62 m (203 ft)

Population (2025-12-31)
  - Total: 565
  - Density: 17.7/km^{2} (45.9/sq mi)
- Time zone: UTC+01:00 (CET)
  - Summer (DST): UTC+02:00 (CEST)
- Postal codes: 17291
- Dialling codes: 039862
- Vehicle registration: UM
- Website: www.amt-bruessow.de

Carmzow-Wallmow is a municipality in the Uckermark district, in Brandenburg, Germany.

== Demography ==
Development of Population since 1875 within the Current Boundaries (Blue Line: Population; Dotted Line: Comparison to Population Development of Brandenburg state; Grey Background: Time of Nazi rule; Red Background: Time of Communist rule)

Carmzow-Wallmow: Population development
within the current boundaries (2020)

Year	Pop.	±% p.a.
1875	776	—
1890	738	−0.33%
1910	1,029	+1.68%
1925	1,262	+1.37%
1939	1,079	−1.11%
1950	1,719	+4.32%
1964	1,191	−2.59%

Year	Pop.	±% p.a.
1971	1,188	−0.04%
1981	891	−2.84%
1985	870	−0.59%
1990	814	−1.32%
1995	748	−1.68%
2000	736	−0.32%
2005	715	−0.58%

Year	Pop.	±% p.a.
2010	678	−1.06%
2015	634	−1.33%
2016	636	+0.32%
2017	614	−3.46%
2018	608	−0.98%
2019	616	+1.32%
2020	616	+0.00%
