= Krauschwitz =

Krauschwitz/Krušwica
- Municipality
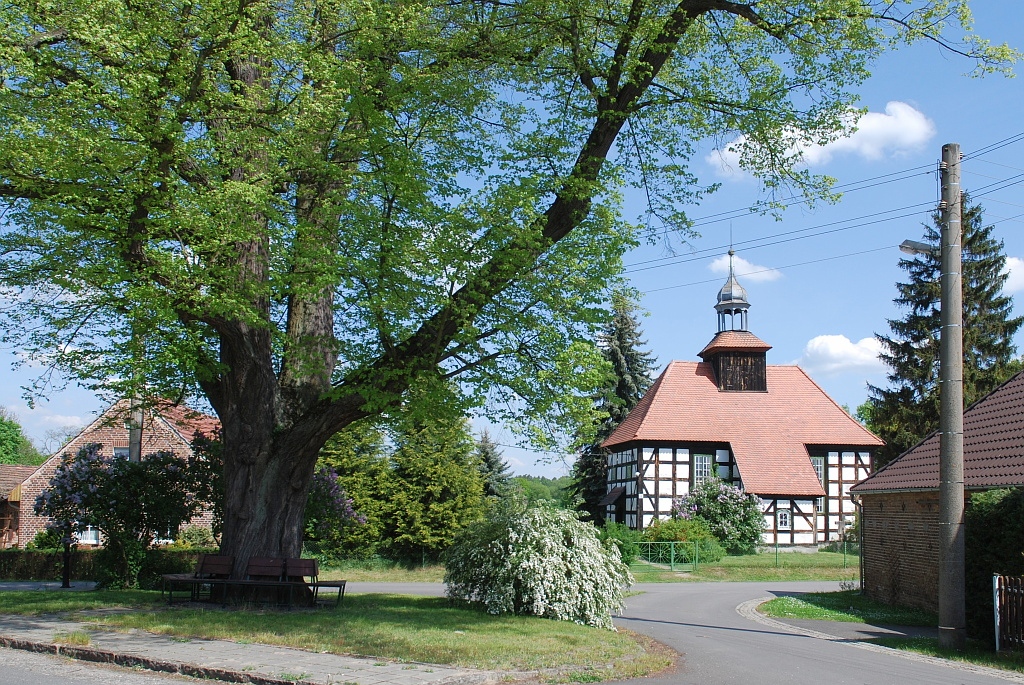
- Parish church in Pechern

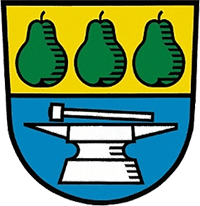
- Coat of arms

- Location of Krauschwitz/Krušwica within Görlitz district
- Interactive map of Krauschwitz/Krušwica
- Location within Germany Location within Saxony
- Coordinates: 51°31′N 14°42′E
- Country: Germany
- State: Saxony
- District: Görlitz
- Subdivisions: 7

Government
  - Mayor (2019–26): Tristan Mühl (FW)

Area
  - Total: 106.62 km^{2} (41.17 sq mi)
- Elevation: 119 m (390 ft)

Population (2025-12-31)
  - Total: 3,130
  - Density: 29.4/km^{2} (76.0/sq mi)
- Time zone: UTC+01:00 (CET)
  - Summer (DST): UTC+02:00 (CEST)
- Postal codes: 02957
- Dialling codes: 035771
- Vehicle registration: GR, LÖB, NOL, NY, WSW, ZI
- Website: www.krauschwitz.de

Krauschwitz (German) or Krušwica (Upper Sorbian pronunciation: [ˈkʁuʃwʲitsa]; full German name: Krauschwitz i.d. O.L.) is a municipality in the Görlitz district of Saxony, Germany at the border with Poland. It is situated on the western banks of the Lusatian Neisse river, south of Bad Muskau. The municipality was established on 1 January 1994 by the merger of the villages Klein Priebus, Krauschwitz, Pechern, Podrosche, Sagar, Skerbersdorf, and Werdeck.

The municipality is part of the recognized Sorbian settlement area in Saxony. Upper Sorbian has an official status next to German, all villages bear names in both languages.

The settlement Kruswica, after Upper Sorbian: Krušwa ("pear"), was first mentioned in a 1400 deed. Most of the area then belonged to the Upper Lusatian Muskau state country, except for the village of Pechern (Pěchč), which - together with abandoned Neudorf - formed the westernmost part of the Silesian Duchy of Żagań.

At Podrosche (Podroždź) is a road border crossing to the Polish village of Przewóz.

== Twin towns ==
- Gmina Przewóz, Poland
- Ottersweier, Germany
