= Grunow =

Grunow may refer to:

== German municipalities ==
- Grünow, Brandenburg
- Grunow-Dammendorf
- Grünow, Mecklenburg-Vorpommern

== People ==
- Albert Grunow (1826–1914), German-Austrian chemist and phycologist
- Gertrud Grunow (1870–1944), first woman teacher at the Bauhaus art school
