= Vogelsang-Warsin =

- Municipality
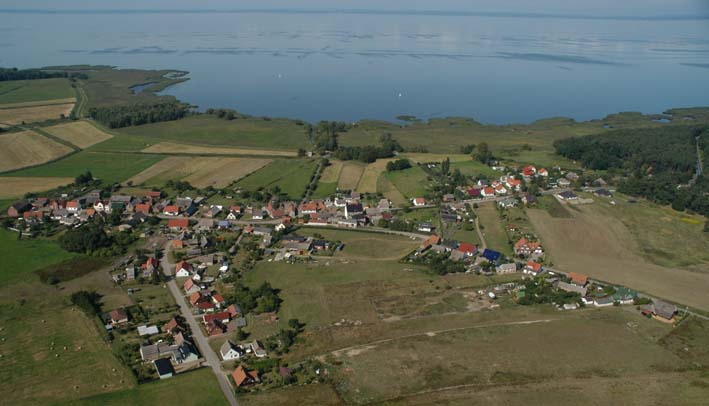
- Aerial view of Warsin

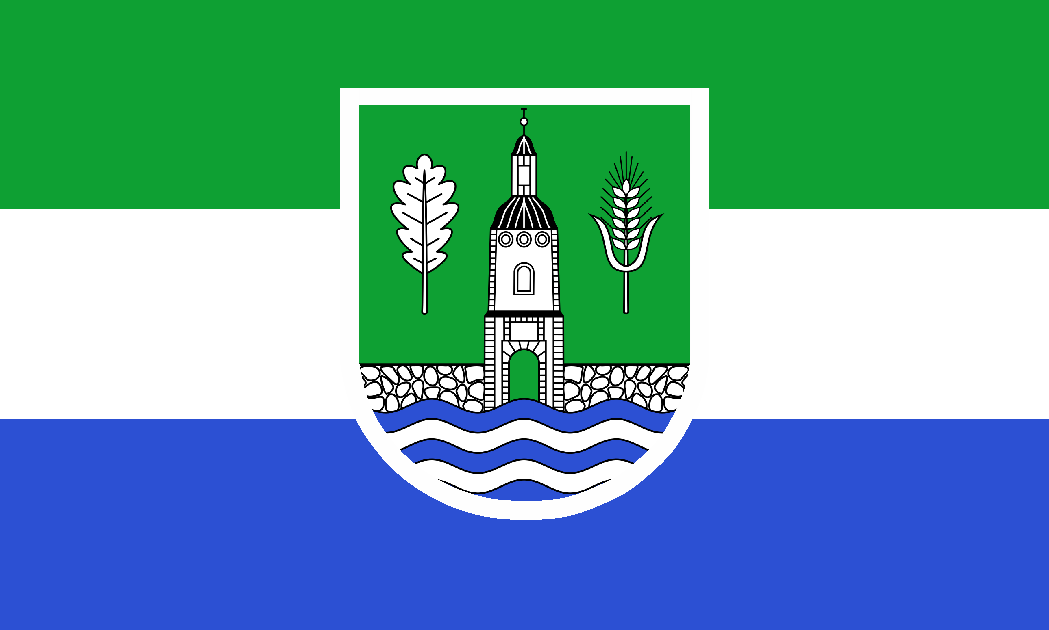
- Flag Coat of arms

- Location of Vogelsang-Warsin within Vorpommern-Greifswald district
- Interactive map of Vogelsang-Warsin
- Location within Germany Location within Mecklenburg-Vorpommern
- Coordinates: 53°43′N 14°11′E
- Country: Germany
- State: Mecklenburg-Vorpommern
- District: Vorpommern-Greifswald
- Municipal assoc.: Am Stettiner Haff

Government
  - Mayor: Ingo Grönow

Area
  - Total: 63.20 km^{2} (24.40 sq mi)
- Elevation: 5 m (16 ft)

Population (2025-12-31)
  - Total: 375
  - Density: 5.93/km^{2} (15.4/sq mi)
- Time zone: UTC+01:00 (CET)
  - Summer (DST): UTC+02:00 (CEST)
- Postal codes: 17375
- Dialling codes: 039773
- Vehicle registration: VG
- Website: www.amt-am-stettiner-haff.de

Vogelsang-Warsin is a municipality in the Vorpommern-Greifswald district, in Mecklenburg-Vorpommern, Germany.

== History ==
From 1648 to 1720, Vogelsang-Warsin was part of Swedish Pomerania. From 1720 to 1945, it was part of the Prussian Province of Pomerania, from 1945 to 1952 of the State of Mecklenburg-Vorpommern, from 1952 to 1990 of the Bezirk Neubrandenburg of East Germany and since 1990 again of Mecklenburg-Vorpommern.
