= Treplin =

- Municipality
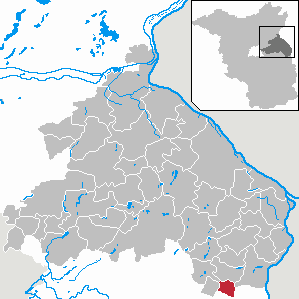
- Location of Treplin within Märkisch-Oderland district
- Interactive map of Treplin
- Location within Germany Location within Brandenburg
- Coordinates: 52°23′29″N 14°23′52″E
- Country: Germany
- State: Brandenburg
- District: Märkisch-Oderland
- Municipal assoc.: Lebus

Government
  - Mayor (2024–29): Sabine Rosslau

Area
  - Total: 11.24 km^{2} (4.34 sq mi)
- Elevation: 88 m (289 ft)

Population (2025-12-31)
  - Total: 356
  - Density: 31.7/km^{2} (82.0/sq mi)
- Time zone: UTC+01:00 (CET)
  - Summer (DST): UTC+02:00 (CEST)
- Postal codes: 15236
- Dialling codes: 033602
- Vehicle registration: MOL
- Website: Gemeinde Treplin

Treplin is a municipality in the district Märkisch-Oderland, in Brandenburg, Germany.

== Demography ==
Development of Population since 1875 within the Current Boundaries (Blue Line: Population; Dotted Line: Comparison to Population Development of Brandenburg state; Grey Background: Time of Nazi rule; Red Background: Time of Communist rule)

Treplin: Population development
within the current boundaries (2013)

Year	Pop.	±% p.a.
1875	415	—
1890	394	−0.35%
1910	377	−0.22%
1925	397	+0.35%
1933	439	+1.26%
1939	407	−1.25%
1946	456	+1.64%
1950	495	+2.07%
1964	358	−2.29%
1971	342	−0.65%
1981	279	−2.02%
1985	285	+0.53%
1989	287	+0.17%
1990	291	+1.39%
1991	285	−2.06%
1992	270	−5.26%
1993	273	+1.11%
1994	314	+15.02%
1995	382	+21.66%
1996	418	+9.42%

Year	Pop.	±% p.a.
1997	453	+8.37%
1998	462	+1.99%
1999	477	+3.25%
2000	468	−1.89%
2001	431	−7.91%
2002	445	+3.25%
2003	438	−1.57%
2004	429	−2.05%
2005	421	−1.86%
2006	425	+0.95%
2007	427	+0.47%
2008	423	−0.94%
2009	424	+0.24%
2010	405	−4.48%
2011	389	−3.95%
2012	391	+0.51%
2013	382	−2.30%
2014	378	−1.05%
2015	377	−0.26%
2016	374	−0.80%
