= Daubitz =

Daubitz Dubc
- Village
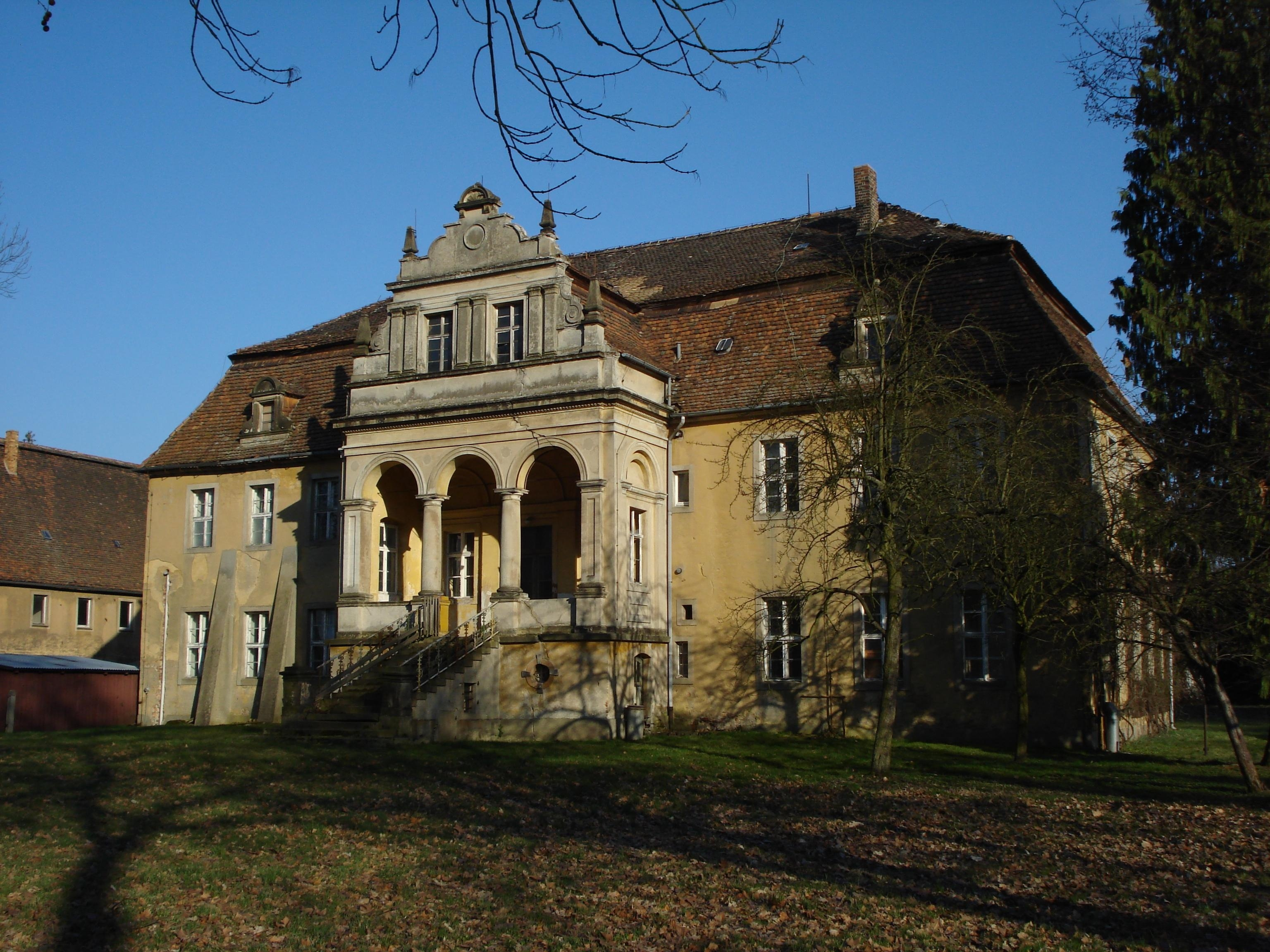
- Baroque castle in Daubitz (2008)

- Location within Germany
- Coordinates: 51°23′50″N 14°49′50″E
- Country: Germany
- State: Saxony
- First mentioned: 1346

Area
  - Total: 8.68 sq mi (22.49 km^{2})
- Elevation: 469 ft (143 m)

Population (2009)
  - Total: 563
  - Density: 64.8/sq mi (25.0/km^{2})
- Postal code: 02956
- Area code: 035 772

Daubitz (Upper Sorbian: Dubc, pronounced [ˈdupts]) is a village and district of the municipality of Rietschen in the Saxon district of Görlitz. It is part of the Sorbian-inhabited region of Lusatia.

== History ==
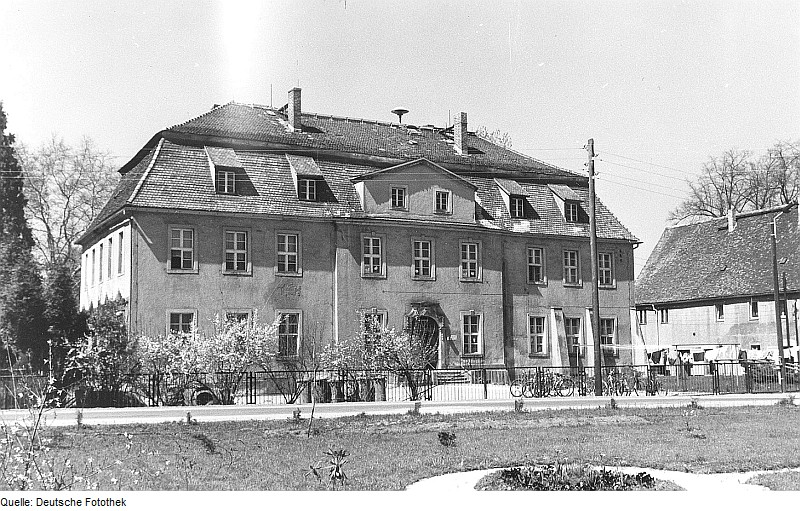
Castle in Daubitz, 1986

The oldest known mention of the village comes from 1346. In 1398 it was mentioned under its Sorbian name Ducz. It was established in the Middle Ages as a Sorbian village.

During World War II, the Germans operated a forced labor subcamp of the Stalag VIII-A prisoner-of-war camp in the village.

== Demographics ==
Year	Population
1825	788
1871	1142
1885	1089
1905	1020
1910	1081
1925	1094
1939	988
1946	1304
1950	1298
1960	1107
1964	981
1970	959
1980	867
1985	787
1990	707
1996	631
2005	621
2008	550
2009	563
