= Großdubrau =

Großdubrau/Wulka Dubrawa
- Municipality
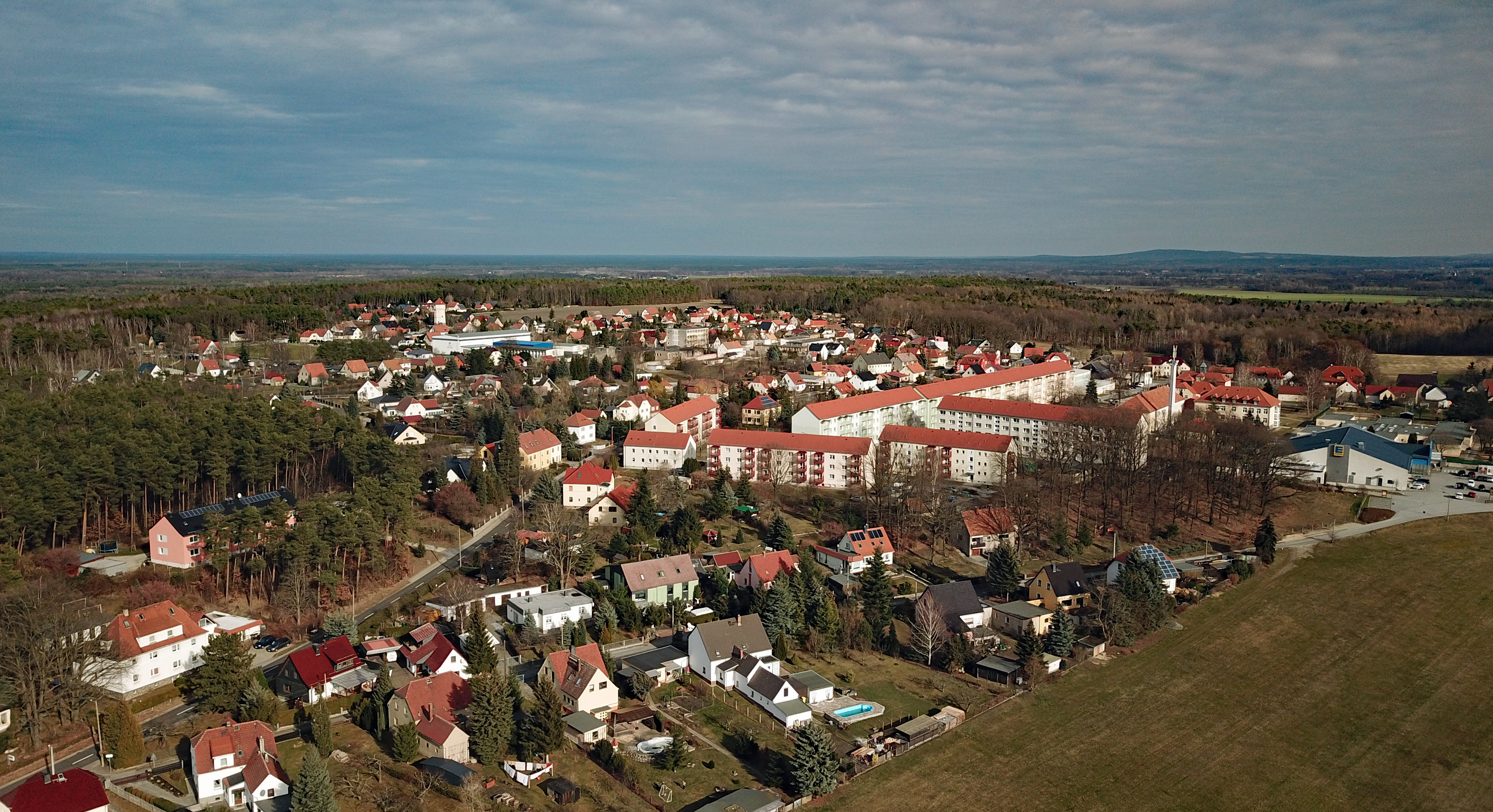
- Aerial view

- Coat of arms

- Location of Großdubrau/Wulka Dubrawa within Bautzen district
- Interactive map of Großdubrau/Wulka Dubrawa
- Location within Germany Location within Saxony
- Coordinates: 51°15′N 14°28′E
- Country: Germany
- State: Saxony
- District: Bautzen
- Subdivisions: 20

Government
  - Mayor (2022–29): Hardy Glausch (Ind.)

Area
  - Total: 54.22 km^{2} (20.93 sq mi)
- Elevation: 156 m (512 ft)

Population (2025-12-31)
  - Total: 3,978
  - Density: 73.37/km^{2} (190.0/sq mi)
- Time zone: UTC+01:00 (CET)
  - Summer (DST): UTC+02:00 (CEST)
- Postal codes: 02694
- Dialling codes: 035934
- Vehicle registration: BZ, BIW, HY, KM
- Website: www.grossdubrau.de

Großdubrau (German) or Wulka Dubrawa (Upper Sorbian, pronounced [ˈwulka ˈdubʁawa]) is a municipality in eastern Saxony, Germany. It belongs to Bautzen district and lies north of the town of Bautzen.

The municipality is part of the recognized Sorbian settlement area in Saxony. Upper Sorbian has an official status next to German, all villages bear names in both languages.

== Geography ==
The municipality is situated in the Upper Lusatian flatland.

== Villages ==
Twenty villages belong to the municipality, within Großdubrau's five smaller municipalities (Gemeinden).

Place names are given in German/Upper Sorbian, followed by the number of inhabitants:

- Großdubrau/Wulka Dubrawa, with the villages:
  - Großdubrau/Wulka Dubrawa, 1,752 inh.
  - Kleindubrau/Mała Dubrawa, 136 inh.
  - Brehmen/Brěmjo, 127 inh.
  - Crosta/Chróst, 474 inh.
- Commerau/Komorow, with the villages:
  - Commerau/Komorow, 163 inh.
  - Kauppa/Kupoj, 83 inh.
  - Jetscheba/Jatřob, 77 inh.
  - Göbeln/Kobjelń, 62 inh.
- Klix/Klukš, with the villages:
  - Klix/Klukš, 253 inh.
  - Spreewiese/Lichań, 121 inh. (German name Leichnam until 1911)
  - Särchen/Zdźar, 70 inh.
  - Salga/Załhow, 70 inh.
  - Neusärchen/Nowe Zdźarki, 34 inh.
- Quatitz/Chwaćicy, with the villages:
  - Quatitz/Chwaćicy, 251 inh.
  - Dahlowitz/Dalicy, 90 inh.
  - Jeschütz/Ješicy, 59 inh.
  - Kronförstchen/Křiwa Boršć, 80 inh.
  - Margarethenhütte/Margarěćina hěta, 23 inh.
- Sdier/Zdźěr, with the villages:
  - Sdier/Zdźěr, 274 inh.
  - Zschillichau/Čelchow, 77 inh.

== History ==
From 1952 to 1990, Großdubrau was part of the Bezirk Dresden of East Germany.
