= Rietschen =

Rietschen Rěčicy
- Municipality
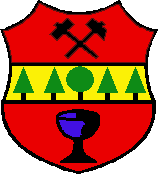
- Coat of arms

- Location of Rietschen within Görlitz district
- Interactive map of Rietschen
- Location within Germany Location within Saxony
- Coordinates: 51°24′N 14°47′E
- Country: Germany
- State: Saxony
- District: Görlitz
- Subdivisions: 6

Government
  - Mayor (2017–24): Ralf Brehmer

Area
  - Total: 72.75 km^{2} (28.09 sq mi)
- Elevation: 143 m (469 ft)

Population (2025-12-31)
  - Total: 2,385
  - Density: 32.78/km^{2} (84.91/sq mi)
- Demonym(s): German: Rietschener; Upper Sorbian: Rěčican (m.), Rěčicanka (f.)
- Time zone: UTC+01:00 (CET)
  - Summer (DST): UTC+02:00 (CEST)
- Postal codes: 02956
- Dialling codes: 035772
- Vehicle registration: GR, LÖB, NOL, NY, WSW, ZI
- Website: www.rietschen-online.de

Rietschen (German) or Rěčicy (Upper Sorbian pronunciation: [ˈʁʲɪtʃitsɨ]) is a municipality in the district of Görlitz, Saxony, Germany. It consists of the Ortsteile (divisions) Rietschen, Daubitz, Teicha, Altliebel, Hammerstadt and Neuliebel.

The municipality is part of the recognized Sorbian settlement area in Saxony. Upper Sorbian has an official status next to German, all villages bear names in both languages.
