= Schwarzer Schöps =

River in Germany

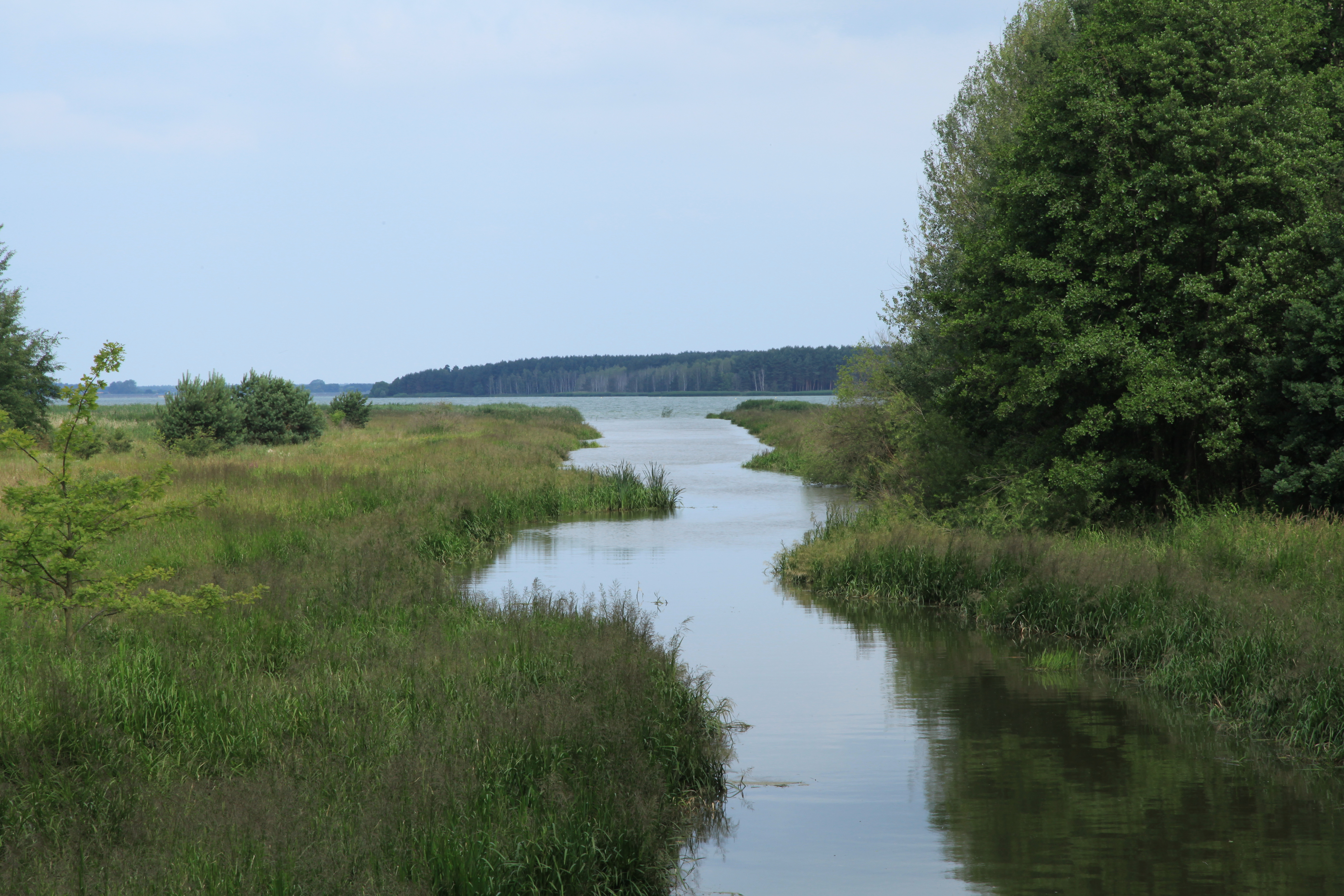

Location
- Country: Germany
- States: Saxony

Physical characteristics
- Mouth
  - location: Spree
  - coordinates: 51.4297°N 14.5239°E

Basin features
- Progression: Spree→ Havel→ Elbe→ North Sea

Schwarzer Schöps is a river of Saxony, Germany. It is a right tributary of the Spree, which it joins northwest of Boxberg.

== See also ==
- List of rivers of Saxony
