= Sophienfließ =

River in Germany

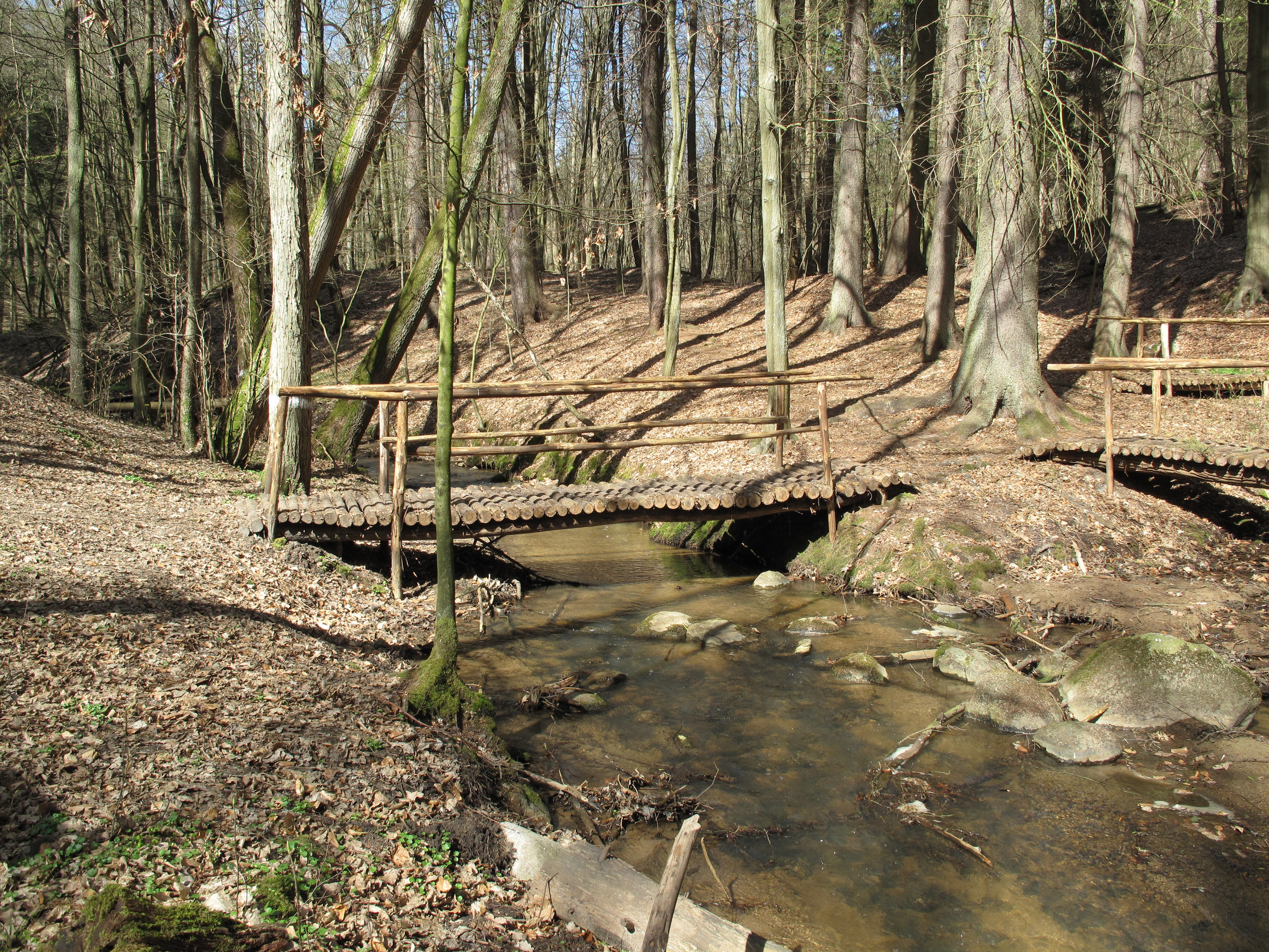

Location
- Country: Germany
- State: Brandenburg

Physical characteristics
- Source
  - location: Schloßsee at Prötzel
- Mouth
  - location: Schermützelsee at Buckow
  - coordinates: 52.5767°N 14.0677°E
- Length: 10 km (6.2 mi)

Basin features
- Progression: Werderfließ→ Stöbber→ Alte Oder→ Oder→ Baltic Sea

Sophienfließ is a river in the hill country „Märkische Schweiz“ and the Märkische Schweiz Nature Park, District Märkisch-Oderland, Brandenburg, Germany. The stream runs over a distance of approximately 10 km (6 mi).

The water passes across the Schermützelsee and the Werderfließ to the Buckowsee, who is flown through by the river Stöbber.

== See also ==
- List of rivers of Brandenburg
