= Hohenstein (Strausberg) =

- Ortsteil of Strausberg
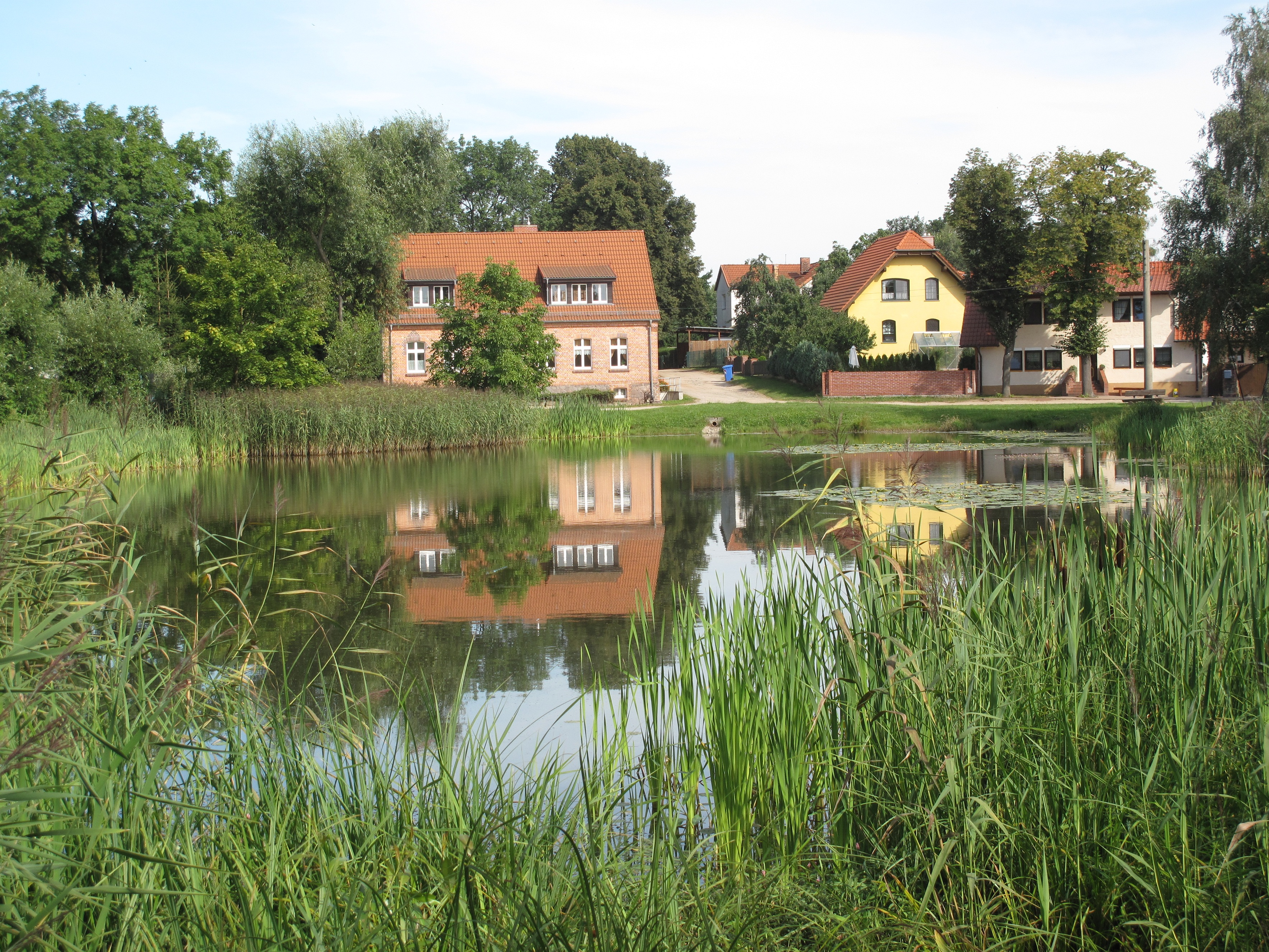
- Village pond and some houses
- Interactive map of Hohenstein
- Location within Germany Location within Brandenburg
- Coordinates: 52°34′3″N 13°58′14″E
- Country: Germany
- State: Brandenburg
- District: Märkisch-Oderland
- Municipality: Strausberg
- Elevation: 94 m (308 ft)

Population (2007-12-31)
  - Total: 233
- Time zone: UTC+01:00 (CET)
  - Summer (DST): UTC+02:00 (CEST)
- Postal codes: 15344
- Dialling codes: 03341
- Vehicle registration: MOL
- Website: Official website

Hohenstein (German pronunciation: [ˈhoːənˌʃtaɪn]) is a village and a civil parish (Ortsteil) of the German town of Strausberg, located in the district of Märkisch-Oderland in Brandenburg. As of 2007 its population was of 233.

== History ==
The village was first mentioned in 1375 with the name of Hohensten.

== Geography ==
Hohenstein is situated in the east of Strausberg, on a road linking the town and Buckow, close to Ruhlsdorf and to the western entrance to the Märkische Schweiz Nature Park. It is also connected with the nearby village of Gladowshöhe by a road that links Rehfelde and Garzau-Garzin with Klosterdorf.

== See also ==
- Strausberg
- Gladowshöhe
- Ruhlsdorf
