= Stöbber =

River in Germany

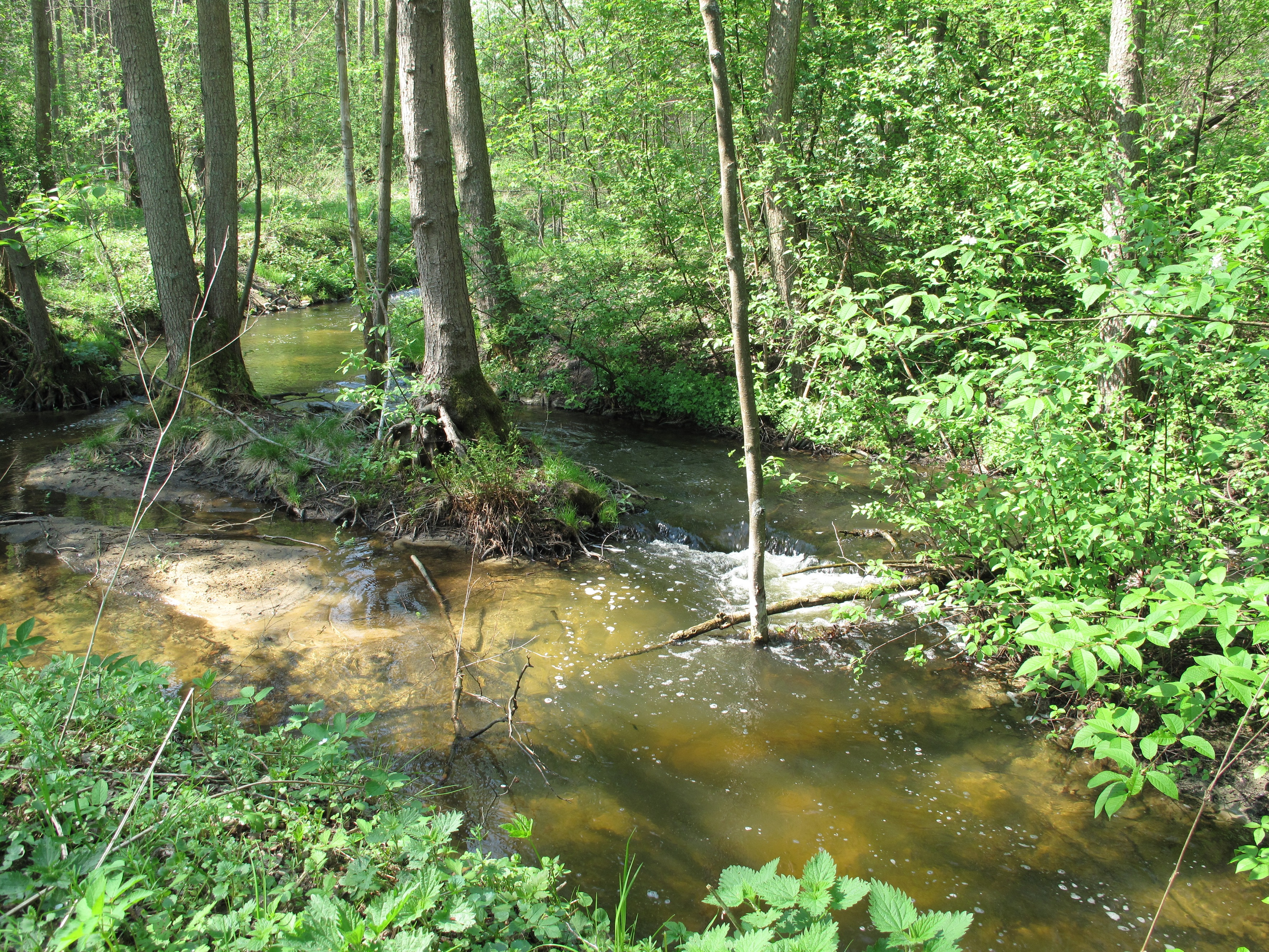
- The Stobber between Waldsieversdorf and Buckow

Location
- Country: Germany
- State: Brandenburg
- District: Märkisch-Oderland

Physical characteristics
- Source
  - location: Rotes Luch on the Drainage divide between the Baltic Sea and the North Sea
  - elevation: 48 m (157 ft)
- Mouth
  - location: nearby Altfriedland confluence with the Quappendorfer Kanal to the Friedländer Strom
  - coordinates: 52.6402°N 14.2249°E
  - elevation: 5 m (16 ft)
- Length: 25 km (16 mi)
- Basin size: 220 km^{2} (85 sq mi)

Basin features
- Progression: Alte Oder→ Oder→ Baltic Sea
- Landmarks: Small towns: Buckow, Müncheberg; Villages: Garzau-Garzin, Waldsieversdorf, Oberbarnim, Märkische Höhe, Neuhardenberg
- Tributaries
  - left: Sophienfließ, Höllenbach (also: Hölle)
  - right: Mühlenfließ, Hoher Graben
- Waterbodies: Lakes: Buckowsee, Griepensee

The Stöbber (also: Stobber) is the central river in the hilly landscape of "Märkische Schweiz" and the Märkische Schweiz Nature Park, Brandenburg, Germany. The stream runs over a distance of 25 kilometres (16 mi) from the fen and source region of Rotes Luch towards the northeast through Buckow to the Oderbruch. Near Neuhardenberg the Stöbber flows into the Alte Oder, whose waters run over some canals to the Oder River and the Baltic Sea. On a roughly 13-kilometre-long (8.1 mi) route of its course there is designated the nature protection area "Naturschutzgebiet Stobbertal". In Altfriedland, the river passes the Damm-Mühle (watermill) and, directly alongside the Kietzer See (lake), a Special European Protection Area (SPA) for the conservation of wild living birds (Birds Directive).

== See also ==
- List of rivers of Brandenburg
