= Ruhlsdorf =

Ruhlsdorf may refer to several places in Germany:

- Ruhlsdorf (Jessen), a civil parish of Jessen, in Brandenburg
- Ruhlsdorf (Marienwerder), a civil parish of Marienwerder, in Brandenburg
- Ruhlsdorf (Nuthe-Urstromtal), a civil parish of Nuthe-Urstromtal, in Brandenburg
- Ruhlsdorf (Strausberg), a civil parish of Strausberg, in Brandenburg
- Ruhlsdorf (Teltow), a civil parish of Teltow, in Brandenburg
