= Ruhlsdorf (Strausberg) =

- Ortsteil of Strausberg
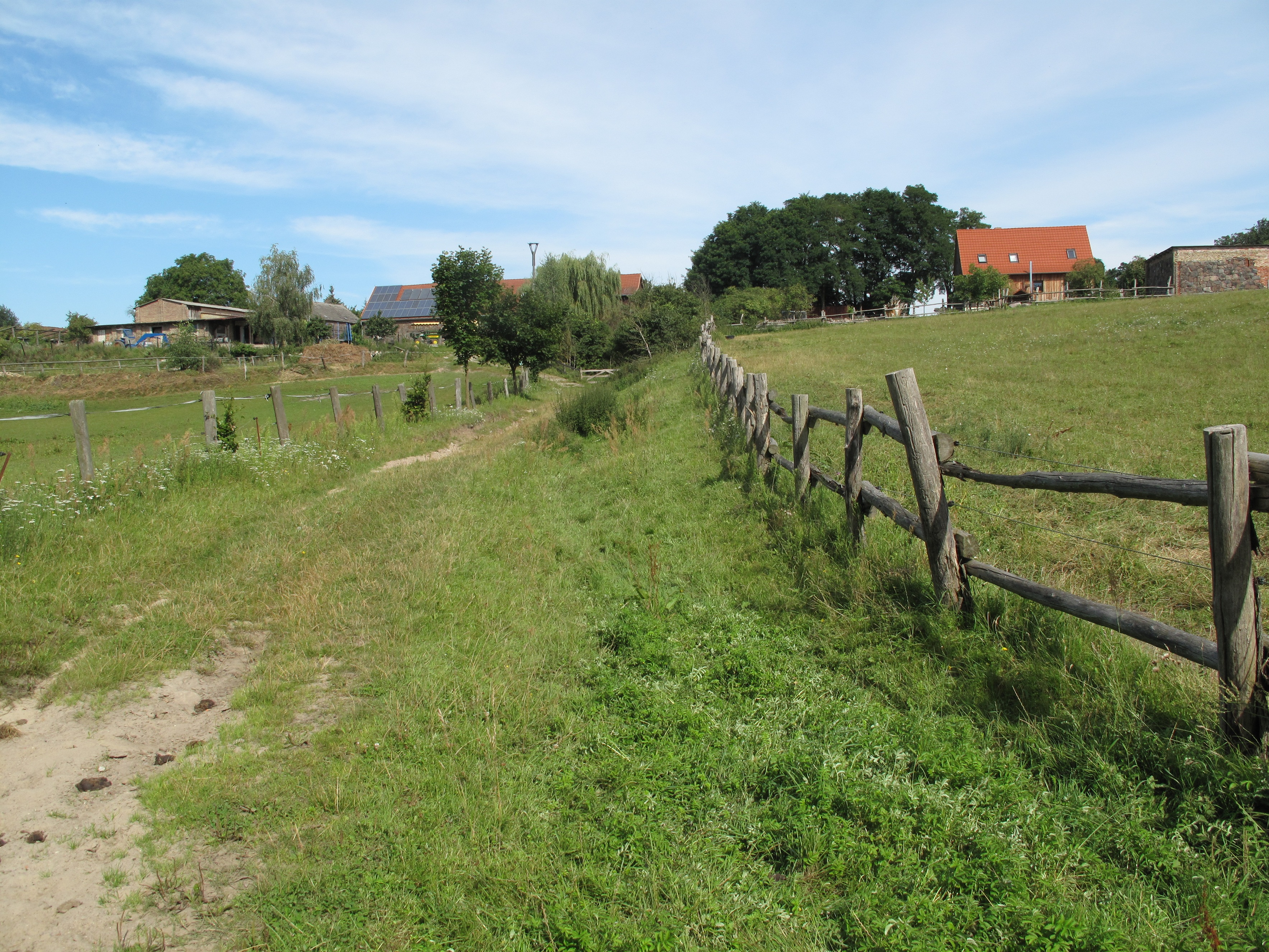
- Landscape in south of Ruhlsdorf
- Interactive map of Ruhlsdorf
- Location within Germany Location within Brandenburg
- Coordinates: 52°34′10″N 13°59′36″E
- Country: Germany
- State: Brandenburg
- District: Märkisch-Oderland
- Municipality: Strausberg
- Elevation: 94 m (308 ft)

Population (2007-12-31)
  - Total: 44
- Time zone: UTC+01:00 (CET)
  - Summer (DST): UTC+02:00 (CEST)
- Postal codes: 15344
- Dialling codes: 03341
- Vehicle registration: MOL

Ruhlsdorf is a village and a civil parish (Ortsteil) of the German town of Strausberg, located in the district of Märkisch-Oderland in Brandenburg. With a population of 44 (as of 2007), it is the littlest one of its municipality.

== Geography ==
The village is situated at the eastern borders of its municipality, close to Hohenstein and in the territory of the Märkische Schweiz Nature Park. It is crossed by a road linking Strausberg and Buckow and, in south of the inhabited area, it lies a little lake named Ruhlsdorfer See.

== Tourism ==
Ruhlsdorf is a receptive place for tourism due to its natural environment and to its position in a nature park.

== See also ==
- Strausberg
- Gladowshöhe
- Hohenstein
