= Gladowshöhe =

- Ortsteil of Strausberg
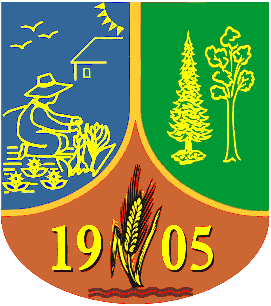
- Coat of arms
- Interactive map of Gladowshöhe
- Location within Germany Location within Brandenburg
- Coordinates: 52°33′13″N 13°56′44″E
- Country: Germany
- State: Brandenburg
- District: Märkisch-Oderland
- Municipality: Strausberg
- Elevation: 94 m (308 ft)

Population (2007-12-31)
  - Total: 217
- Time zone: UTC+01:00 (CET)
  - Summer (DST): UTC+02:00 (CEST)
- Postal codes: 15344
- Dialling codes: 03341
- Vehicle registration: MOL
- Website: Official website

Gladowshöhe is a village and a civil parish (Ortsteil) of the German town of Strausberg, located in the district of Märkisch-Oderland in Brandenburg. As of 2007 its population was of 217.

== History ==
The place developed between 1904 and 1906 on the boundaries of the landowner Ferdinand Gladow, which let also measure this range and after that the place was designated. Village's name means "Gladow's Height".

== Geography ==
Gladowshöhe is located in the south-eastern area of Strausberg, few km to the western borders of the Märkische Schweiz Nature Park, on a road linking Rehfelde and Garzau-Garzin to Hohenstein.

== See also ==
- Strausberg
- Hohenstein
- Ruhlsdorf
