= Märkisch-Oderland II =

State electoral district of Germany

32: Märkisch-Oderland II
- Electoral district for the Landtag of Brandenburg
- Märkisch-Oderland II in 2024
- District: Märkisch-Oderland
- Electorate: 48,510 (2024)
- Major settlements: Strausberg

Current electoral district
- Created: 1994
- Party: AfD
- Member: Erik Pardeik

Märkisch-Oderland II is an electoral constituency (German: Wahlkreis) represented in the Landtag of Brandenburg. It elects one member via first-past-the-post voting. Under the constituency numbering system, it is designated as constituency 32. It is located in within the district of Märkisch-Oderland.

== Geography ==
The constituency includes the town of Strausberg, the communities of Petershagen/Eggersdorf and Rüdersdorf.

There were 48,510 eligible voters in 2024.

== Members ==
| Election | Member | Party | % |
|---|---|---|---|
| 2004 | Kerstin Kaiser | PDS | 39.8 |
| 2009 | Kerstin Kaiser | Left | 40.4 |
| 2014 | Kerstin Kaiser | Left | 31.5 |
| 2019 | Elske Hilderbrandt | SPD | 25.9 |
| 2024 | Erik Pardeik | AfD | 33.5 |

== Election results ==
=== 2024 election ===
State election (2024): Märkisch-Oderland II
| Notes: | Blue background denotes the winner of the electorate vote. Pink background denotes a candidate elected from their party list. Yellow background denotes an electorate win by a list member, or other incumbent. A ✓ or ✗ denotes status of any incumbent, win or lose respectively. | | | | | | |
| Party | Candidate | Votes | % | ±% | Party votes | % | ±% |
|---|---|---|---|---|---|---|---|
| AfD | Erik Pardeik | 11,440 | 33.5 | ▲11.9 | 10,127 | 29.5 | ▲6.9 |
| SPD | ✗ Elske Hildebrandt | 10,996 | 32.2 | ▲6.3 | 9,659 | 28.1 | ▲2.3 |
| BSW | | | | | 5,793 | 16.9 | |
| CDU | Juschka | 4,335 | 12.7 | ▼4.2 | 3,599 | 10.5 | ▼2.6 |
| Left | Kaiser | 3,190 | 9.3 | ▼7.7 | 1,378 | 4.0 | ▼11.9 |
| BVB/FW | Hauser | 2,895 | 8.5 | ▲1.7 | 959 | 2.8 | ▼2.6 |
| Greens | Göritz-Vorhof | 755 | 2.2 | ▼5.9 | 1,052 | 3.1 | ▼6.5 |
| APT | | | | | 913 | 2.7 | ▼0.2 |
| Plus | | | | | 345 | 1.0 | ▼0.2 |
| FDP | Bewer | 582 | 1.7 | ▼1.4 | 284 | 0.8 | ▼2.6 |
| DLW | | | | | 105 | 0.3 | |
| Values | | | | | 85 | 0.2 | |
| Third Way | | | | | 36 | 0.1 | |
| DKP | | | | | 32 | 0.1 | |
| Informal votes | | 482 | | | 308 | | |
| Total valid votes | | 34,193 | | | 34,367 | | |
| Turnout | | 34,675 | 71.5 | ▲14.9 | | | |
| AfD gain from SPD | Majority | 444 | 1.3 | | | | |

=== 2019 election ===
State election (2019): Märkisch-Oderland II
| Notes: | Blue background denotes the winner of the electorate vote. Pink background denotes a candidate elected from their party list. Yellow background denotes an electorate win by a list member, or other incumbent. A ✓ or ✗ denotes status of any incumbent, win or lose respectively. | | | | | | |
| Party | Candidate | Votes | % | ±% | Party votes | % | ±% |
|---|---|---|---|---|---|---|---|
| SPD | Elske Hildebrandt | 6,964 | 25.9 | ▼4.4 | 6,935 | 25.8 | ▼5.5 |
| AfD | Erik Pardeik | 5,802 | 21.6 | ▲9.4 | 6,050 | 22.5 | ▲9.8 |
| Left | Gregor Weiß | 4,578 | 17.0 | ▼14.5 | 4,270 | 15.9 | ▼10.5 |
| CDU | André Schaller | 4,540 | 16.9 | ▼1.3 | 3,500 | 13.0 | ▼5.0 |
| Greens | René Trocha | 2,178 | 8.1 | ▲4.4 | 2,565 | 9.6 | ▲5.0 |
| BVB/FW | Hans-Joachim Kannekowitz | 1,828 | 6.8 | ▲4.2 | 1,460 | 5.4 | ▲3.4 |
| FDP | Monique Bewer | 830 | 3.1 | ▲1.7 | 909 | 3.4 | ▲2.2 |
| Tierschutzpartei | | | | | 772 | 2.9 | |
| ÖDP | | | | | 164 | 0.6 | |
| German Communist Party | Nils Borchert | 160 | 0.6 | | | | |
| Pirates | | | | | 155 | 0.6 | ▼0.7 |
| V-Partei3 | | | | | 74 | 0.3 | |
| Informal votes | | 348 | | | 374 | | |
| Total valid votes | | 26,880 | | | 26,854 | | |
| Turnout | | 27,228 | 56.6 | ▲12.3 | | | |
| SPD gain from Left | Majority | 1,162 | 4.3 | | | | |

=== 2014 election ===
State election (2014): Märkisch-Oderland II
| Notes: | Blue background denotes the winner of the electorate vote. Pink background denotes a candidate elected from their party list. Yellow background denotes an electorate win by a list member, or other incumbent. A ✓ or ✗ denotes status of any incumbent, win or lose respectively. | | | | | | |
| Party | Candidate | Votes | % | ±% | Party votes | % | ±% |
|---|---|---|---|---|---|---|---|
| Left | ✓ Kerstin Kaiser | 6,509 | 31.5 | ▼8.9 | 5,466 | 26.4 | ▼9.1 |
| SPD | Ravindra Gujjula | 6,261 | 30.3 | ▲8.1 | 6,483 | 31.3 | ▲3.5 |
| CDU | Daniel Krebs | 3,751 | 18.2 | ▼1.2 | 3,722 | 18.0 | ▲1.4 |
| AfD | Maria-Theresia Patzer | 2,524 | 12.2 | | 2,625 | 12.7 | |
| Greens | Matthias Michel | 769 | 3.7 | ▼1.2 | 956 | 4.6 | ▼0.3 |
| NPD | | | | | 418 | 2.0 | ▼0.4 |
| BVB/FW | Susanne Kannekowitz | 544 | 2.6 | ▼0.1 | 412 | 2.0 | Steady |
| Pirates | | | | | 275 | 1.3 | |
| FDP | Robert Krause | 297 | 1.4 | ▼5.6 | 253 | 1.2 | ▼5.5 |
| DKP | | | | | 73 | 0.4 | ▲0.2 |
| REP | | | | | 32 | 0.2 | Steady |
| Informal votes | | 324 | | | 264 | | |
| Total valid votes | | 20,655 | | | 20,715 | | |
| Turnout | | 20,979 | 44.3 | ▼20.5 | | | |
| Left hold | Majority | 248 | 1.2 | ▼17.0 | | | |

=== 2009 election ===
State election (2009): Märkisch-Oderland II
| Notes: | Blue background denotes the winner of the electorate vote. Pink background denotes a candidate elected from their party list. Yellow background denotes an electorate win by a list member, or other incumbent. A ✓ or ✗ denotes status of any incumbent, win or lose respectively. | | | | | | |
| Party | Candidate | Votes | % | ±% | Party votes | % | ±% |
|---|---|---|---|---|---|---|---|
| Left | ✓ Kerstin Kaiser | 12,244 | 40.4 | ▲0.6 | 10,838 | 35.5 | ▼0.9 |
| SPD | Sibylle Bock | 6,728 | 22.2 | ▼7.3 | 8,482 | 27.8 | ▼1.0 |
| CDU | Beate Blechinger | 5,885 | 19.4 | ▲1.8 | 5,078 | 16.6 | ▲0.5 |
| FDP | Thomas Frenzel | 2,119 | 7.0 | ▲3.8 | 2,045 | 6.7 | ▲4.3 |
| Greens | Georg Stockburger | 1,473 | 4.9 | ▲2.4 | 1,505 | 4.9 | ▲2.2 |
| NPD | Antje Kottusch | 1,088 | 3.6 | | 729 | 2.4 | |
| DVU | | | | | 640 | 2.1 | ▼4.3 |
| BVB/FW | Matthias Kelm | 807 | 2.7 | | 607 | 2.0 | |
| RRP | | | | | 197 | 0.6 | |
| 50Plus | | | | | 177 | 0.6 | Steady |
| Die-Volksinitiative | | | | | 80 | 0.3 | |
| REP | | | | | 71 | 0.2 | |
| DKP | | | | | 66 | 0.2 | ▼0.2 |
| Informal votes | | 934 | | | 763 | | |
| Total valid votes | | 30,344 | | | 30,515 | | |
| Turnout | | 31,278 | 64.8 | ▲9.9 | | | |
| Left hold | Majority | 5,516 | 18.2 | ▲7.9 | | | |

=== 2004 election ===
State election (2004): Märkisch-Oderland II
| Notes: | Blue background denotes the winner of the electorate vote. Pink background denotes a candidate elected from their party list. Yellow background denotes an electorate win by a list member, or other incumbent. A ✓ or ✗ denotes status of any incumbent, win or lose respectively. | | | | | | |
| Party | Candidate | Votes | % | ±% | Party votes | % | ±% |
|---|---|---|---|---|---|---|---|
| PDS | Kerstin Kaiser-Nicht | 9,843 | 39.79 | | 9,071 | 36.42 | |
| SPD | Ravindra Gujjula | 7,288 | 29.46 | | 7,163 | 28.76 | |
| CDU | Beate Blechinger | 4,352 | 17.59 | | 4,019 | 16.14 | |
| DVU | | | | | 1,598 | 6.42 | |
| AfW (Free Voters) | Wolfgang Paschke | 1,303 | 5.27 | | 379 | 1.52 | |
| FDP | Heiko Krause | 790 | 3.19 | | 593 | 2.38 | |
| Greens | Uwe Kunath | 608 | 2.46 | | 672 | 2.70 | |
| Familie | | | | | 453 | 1.82 | |
| Gray Panthers | | | | | 293 | 1.18 | |
| 50Plus | | | | | 147 | 0.59 | |
| AUB-Brandenburg | | | | | 142 | 0.57 | |
| Schill | Mirko Eggert | 554 | 2.24 | | 128 | 0.51 | |
| DKP | | | | | 94 | 0.38 | |
| BRB | | | | | 84 | 0.34 | |
| Yes Brandenburg | | | | | 68 | 0.27 | |
| Informal votes | | 665 | | | 499 | | |
| Total valid votes | | 24,738 | | | 24,904 | | |
| Turnout | | 25,403 | 54.87 | | | | |
| PDS win new seat | Majority | 2,555 | 10.33 | | | | |

== See also ==
- Politics of Brandenburg
- Landtag of Brandenburg
