= Straussee =

Lake in Brandenburg, Germany

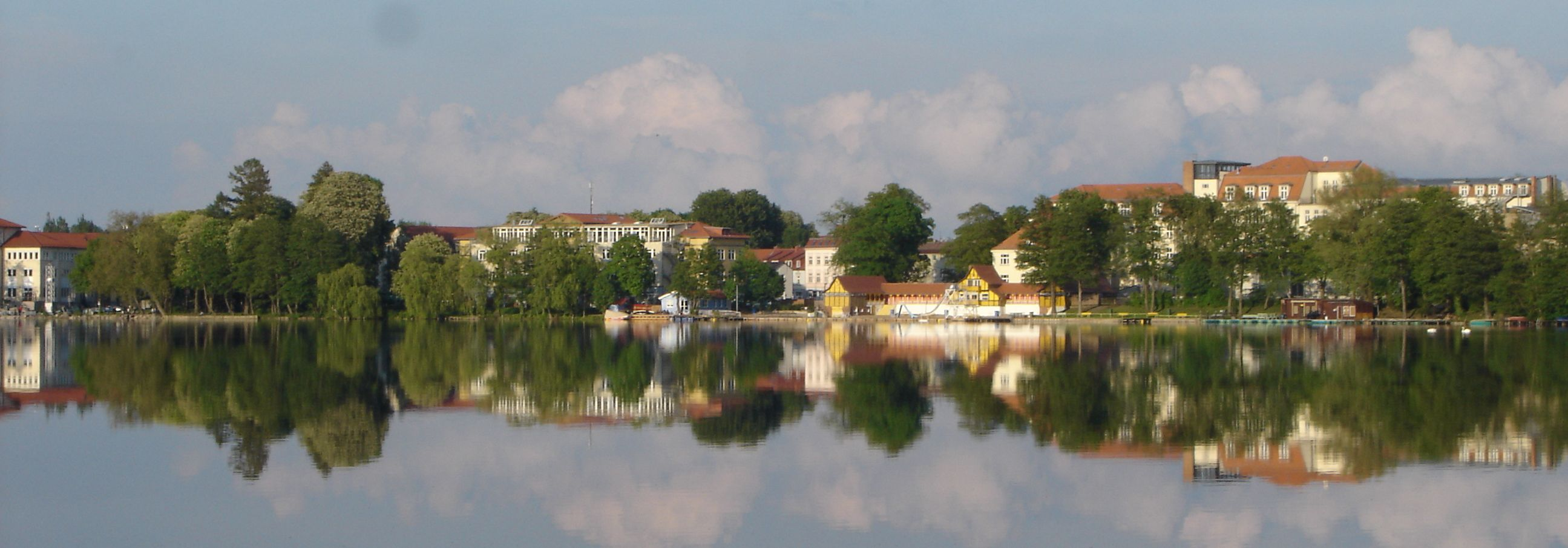

- Location within Brandenburg
- Location: Strausberg, Brandenburg
- Coordinates: 52.582609°N 13.875818°E
- Basin countries: Germany
- Max. length: 3.8 km (2.4 mi)
- Max. width: 600 m (2,000 ft)
- Surface area: 1.36 km^{2} (0.53 sq mi)
- Average depth: 9.9 m (32 ft)
- Max. depth: 20 m (66 ft)
- Water volume: 13,480,000 m^{3} (476,000,000 cu ft)

The Straussee is a German lake located in Strausberg, Brandenburg. It is situated about 30 kilometres (19 mi) north-east of the city of Berlin. The town of Strausberg occupies the eastern shore of the lake, whilst the forest of the Strausberger Forest is on the western shore.

== Overview ==
The lake is approximately 3.8 kilometres (2.4 mi) long and 600 metres (2,000 ft) wide, with an average depth of 9.9 metres (32 ft) and a maximum depth of 20 metres (66 ft). It is crossed in its middle by the Straussee Ferry, an unusual electrically propelled passenger cable ferry.

The lake is relatively rich in fish, and is popular with both anglers and commercial fishermen. It contains populations of northern pike, zander, eel, crayfish, burbot, various species of perch, and carp. Rainbow trout are bred in fish farms.
