= Schermützelsee =

Lake in Brandenburg, Germany

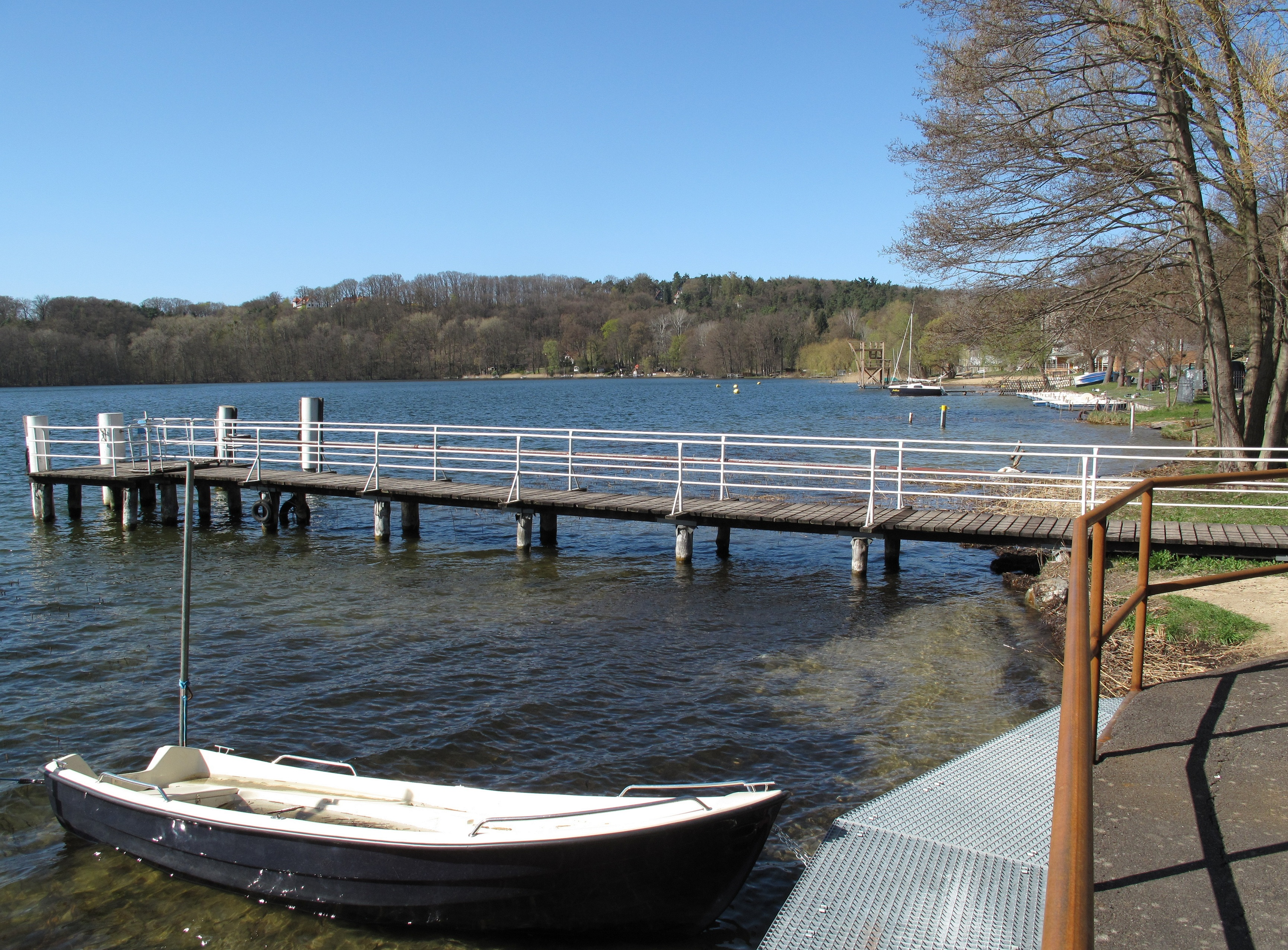

- Location within Brandenburg
- Location: Brandenburg, district Märkisch-Oderland, Märkische Schweiz Nature Park
- Coordinates: 52°34′N 14°04′E
- Primary inflows: Sophienfließ
- Primary outflows: Werderfließ
- Basin countries: Germany
- Max. length: 2,170 m (7,120 ft)
- Max. width: 920 m (3,020 ft)
- Surface area: 1.37 km^{2} (0.53 sq mi)
- Average depth: 17 m (56 ft)
- Max. depth: 38 m (125 ft)
- Water volume: 22.49×10^{6} m^{3} (794×10^{6} cu ft)
- Surface elevation: 26.5 m (87 ft)
- Settlements: Buckow, Bollersdorf

The Schermützelsee is a lake in Brandenburg, Germany. It is located in the town of Buckow in the district Märkisch-Oderland northwest of Müncheberg and 45 km (28 mi) east of the Berlin centre. With its surface area of 1.37 km² it is the largest water body in the hill country "Märkische Schweiz" and in the Märkische Schweiz Nature Park.

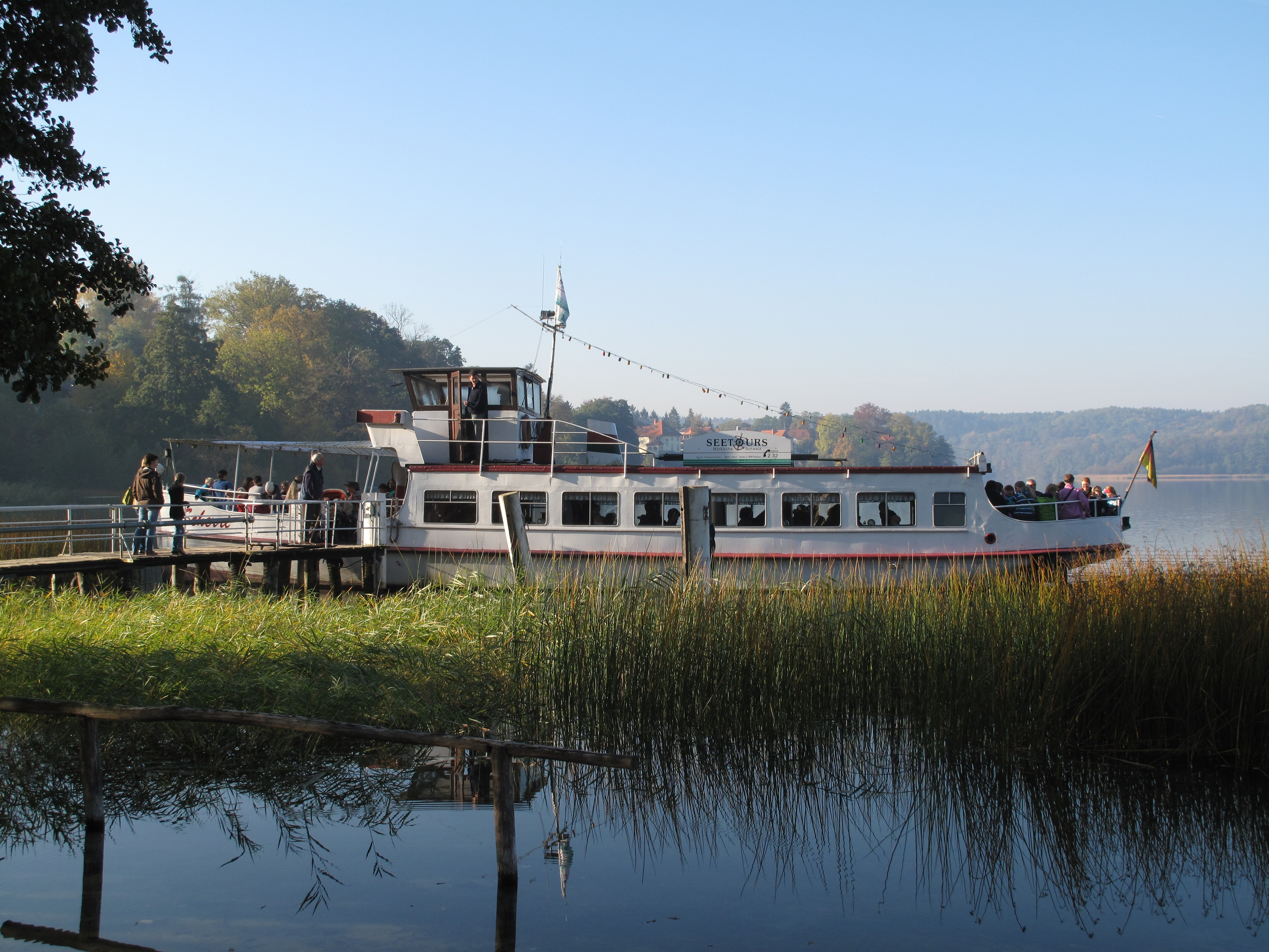
Passenger ship "MS Scherri"

At an elevation of 26.5 m, its depth is maximal 38 m. The lake is fed by the Sophienfließ and groundwater. An approximately 7.5 kilometres long walking path leads around the Schermützelsee. At the northeastern shore there is situated the „Strandbad Buckow“, a public lido/beach with a diving tower, beach café and rowboat rental; it was opened in 1911. On the sea the passenger ship „MS Scherri“ is in operation since 1992, which was built in 1879 by the Reiherstiegwerft in Hamburg. First named „Reiher“ the ship started up 1879 on the Alster.

At the eastern shore is located the listed „Brecht-Weigel-Haus“. Bertolt Brecht and the actress Helene Weigel were working in the summerhouse since 1952 (and Weigel alone after the death of Brecht in 1956). Since 1977 the house is used as museum and memorial to the artist couple. Listed is the whole ensemble, including some buildings as well as the garden with sculptures, sea-balustrade, water tower, boathouse and landing stage.
