= Strausberg =

- Town
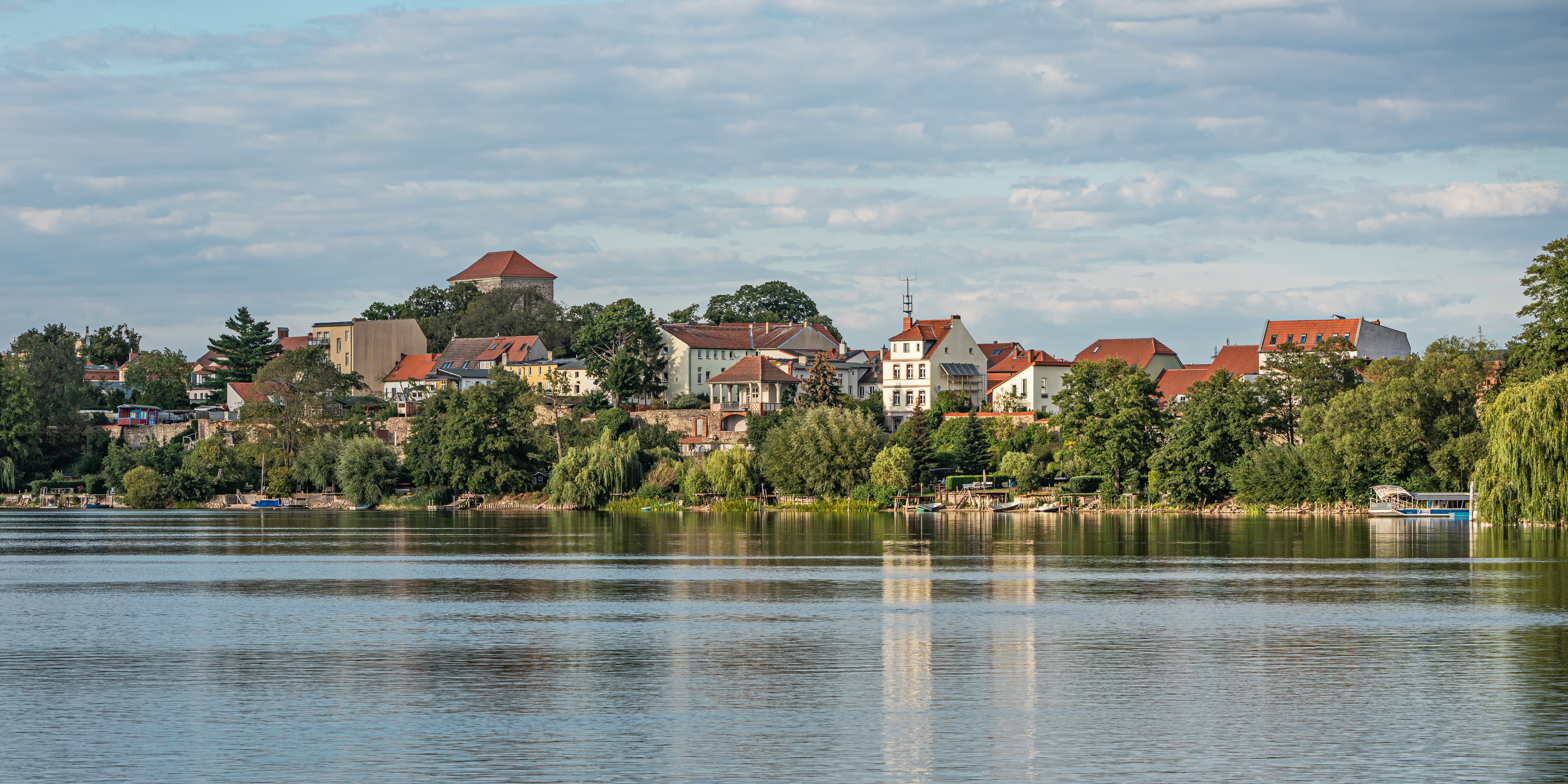
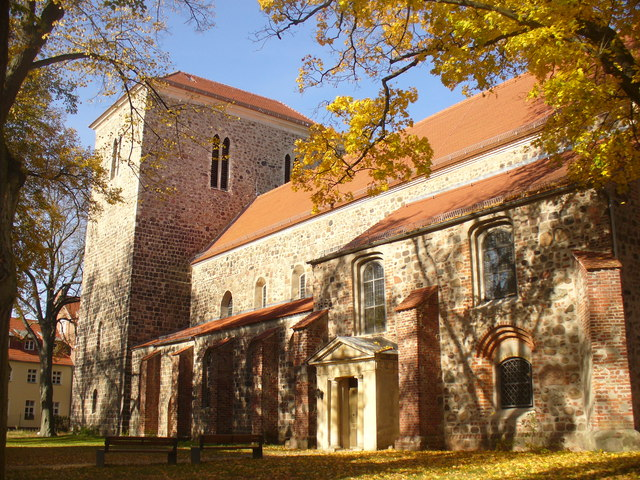
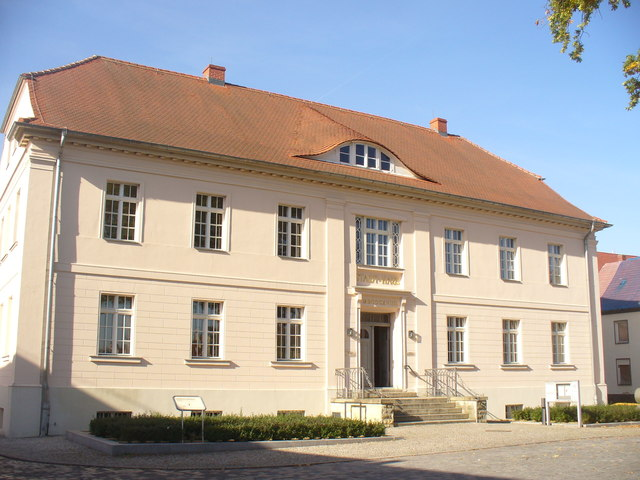
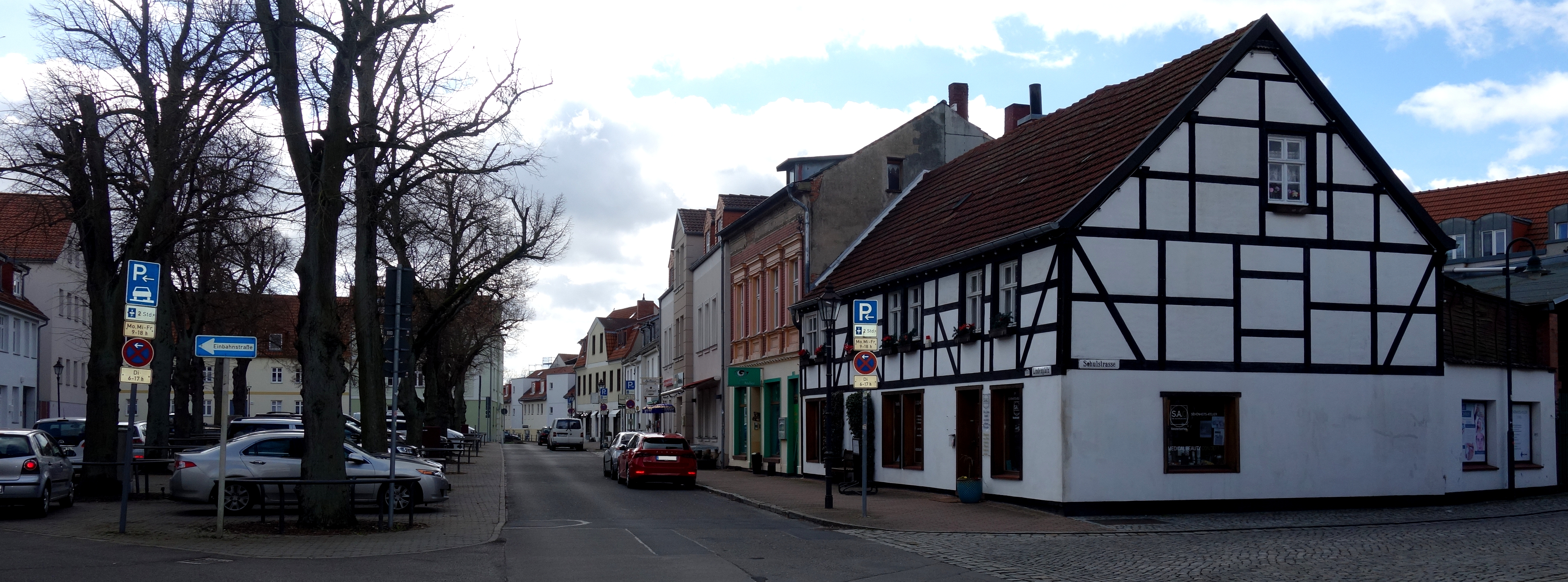
- Strausberg with Straussee St. Maries church Town hall Lindenplatz

- Coat of arms

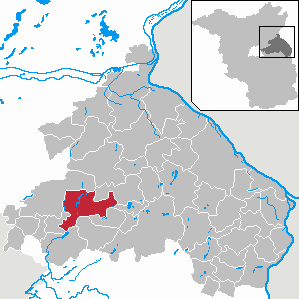
- Locator map in Märkisch-Oderland
- Interactive map of Strausberg
- Location within Germany Location within Brandenburg
- Coordinates: 52°35′00″N 13°53′00″E
- Country: Germany
- State: Brandenburg
- District: Märkisch-Oderland

Government
  - Mayor (2018–26): Elke Stadeler (Ind.)

Area
  - Total: 67.94 km^{2} (26.23 sq mi)
- Elevation: 94 m (308 ft)

Population (2025-12-31)
  - Total: 27,765
  - Density: 408.7/km^{2} (1,058/sq mi)
- Time zone: UTC+01:00 (CET)
  - Summer (DST): UTC+02:00 (CEST)
- Postal codes: 15344
- Dialling codes: 03341
- Vehicle registration: MOL, FRW, SEE, SRB
- Website: www.stadt-strausberg.de

Strausberg (German: [ˈʃtʁaʊsˌbɛʁk]) is a town in Brandenburg, in eastern Germany, located 30 km (19 mi) east of Berlin. With a population of about 27,000 it is the largest town in the district of Märkisch-Oderland.

== History ==
Strausberg was founded circa 1240, and in 1333 its first town hall was built. From 1373 to 1415, it was part of the Bohemian Crown. Today, a historic defensive wall borders the old town. In the 19th century, industrialization took place and the town developed a local labour movement, including union structures and a local branch of both the Social Democratic and the Communist Party of Germany.

In World War II Strausberg housed a switching centre for teleprinter links encrypted by the Lorenz cipher from Hitler and the High Command to various Army Group commanders (see Fish (cryptography)). During the war, men and women from the German-occupied Netherlands, Poland, Italy and the Soviet Union were brought to the town to perform forced labour since 1941, and a women's subcamp of the Sachsenhausen concentration camp was established in 1944. In early 1945, a death march of prisoners of various nationalities from the dissolved camp in Żabikowo to Sachsenhausen passed through the town.

After 1945, the town became part of East Germany and the seat of its Ministry of National Defence. Strausberg was the administrative seat of the Strausberg district until a 1993 merger with Bad Freienwalde and Seelow formed "Märkisch-Oderland", with Seelow becoming the new administrative seat of the district. It is where the German Army Command is located.

== Geography ==
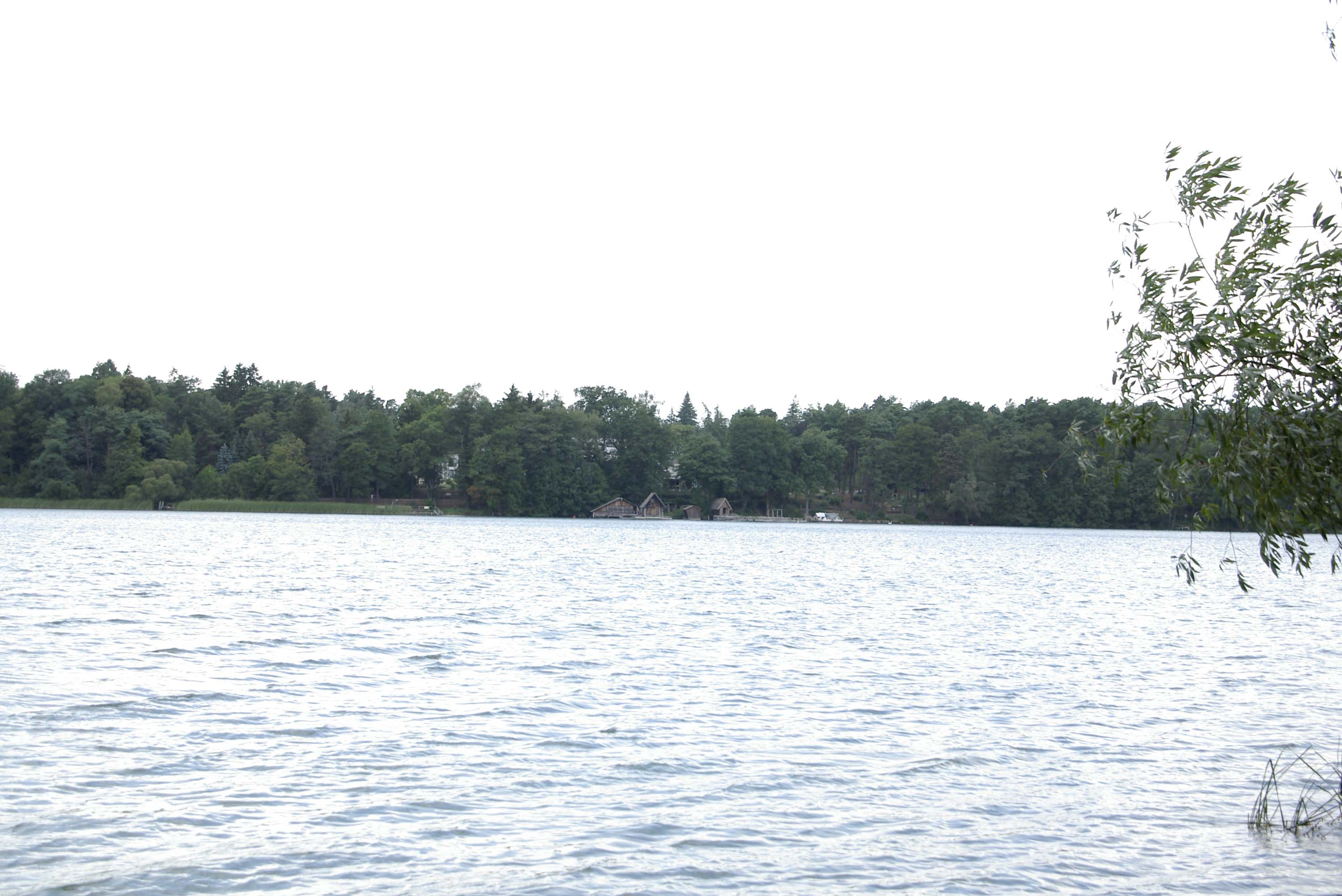
Strausberger Forest and the lake

Strausberg covers an area of 68 km^{2}. There are over 1,500 businesses and 100 km of footpath. It is known as "Die grüne Stadt am See" (the green town by the lake). Its biggest lake is Straussee, located between the town and the biggest forest, the Strausberger Forest. The forest and water protection nurtures a unique environment.

=== Location ===
Strausberg is 30 km east of Berlin (from the district of Marzahn-Hellersdorf) and 30 km to the west of Kostrzyn, at the Polish border. It is part of Berlin/Brandenburg Metropolitan Region and a middle centre (Mittelzentrum) of it. Its bordering municipalities are, listed in a clockwise sense starting from north, Altlandsberg, Oberbarnim, Buckow, Garzau-Garzin, Rehfelde, Rüdersdorf and Petershagen-Eggersdorf.

=== Subdivision ===
The town is divided into nine boroughs: Fasanenpark, Gartenstadt, Hegermühle, Neue Mühle, Postbruch, Schillerhöhe (with the Spitzmühle), Strausberg Nord, Strausberg Stadt and Vorstadt. The municipality has three hamlets (Ortsteile):

- Gladowshöhe (217 inhabitants)
- Hohenstein (233 inhabitants)
- Ruhlsdorf (44 inhabitants)

== Demography ==
After an increase of population since World War II, Strausberg has slowed its "growth", remaining at almost 26,000 inhabitants in the last census, with a slight decrease in the early years of the 21st century. Forecasts, however, anticipate a considerable decline within the next two decades. For further details, see sources of the following graphics.

Development of Population since 1875 within current boundaries (blue line: population; dotted line: comparison to population development of Brandenburg state; grey background: time of Nazi rule; red Background: time of communist rule)

Recent population development and projections (population development before the 2011 census (blue line); recent population development according to the Census in Germany in 2011 (blue bordered line); official projections for 2005–2030 (yellow line); for 2017–2030 (scarlet line); for 2020–2030 (green line)

Strausberg: Population development
within the current boundaries (2020)

Year	Pop.	±% p.a.
1875	5,880	—
1890	7,042	+1.21%
1910	8,568	+0.99%
1925	9,686	+0.82%
1939	12,140	+1.63%
1950	11,040	−0.86%
1964	18,168	+3.62%

Year	Pop.	±% p.a.
1971	19,905	+1.31%
1981	24,917	+2.27%
1985	27,531	+2.53%
1990	28,977	+1.03%
1995	27,312	−1.18%
2000	26,221	−0.81%
2005	26,533	+0.24%

Year	Pop.	±% p.a.
2010	26,206	−0.25%
2015	26,213	+0.01%
2016	26,387	+0.66%
2017	26,522	+0.51%
2018	26,587	+0.25%
2019	26,853	+1.00%
2020	26,939	+0.32%

== Transport ==
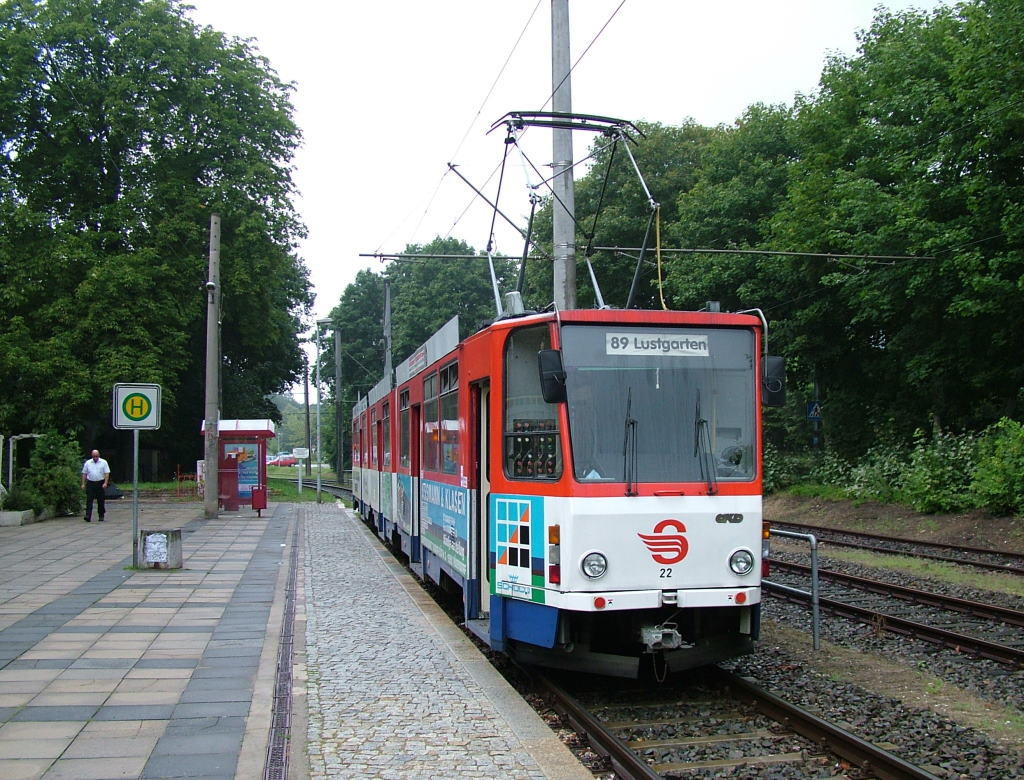
Tram 22 at southern terminus "Vorstadt"

The town is served by Strausberg railway station, situated 6 kilometres (3.7 mi) to the south of the town, which is on the Berlin S-Bahn Line 5 and Deutsche Bahn's Berlin Lichtenberg - Kostrzyn service. There are three other stops on the S5 line within the town, these being Strausberg Hegermühle, Strausberg Stadt and Strausberg Nord.

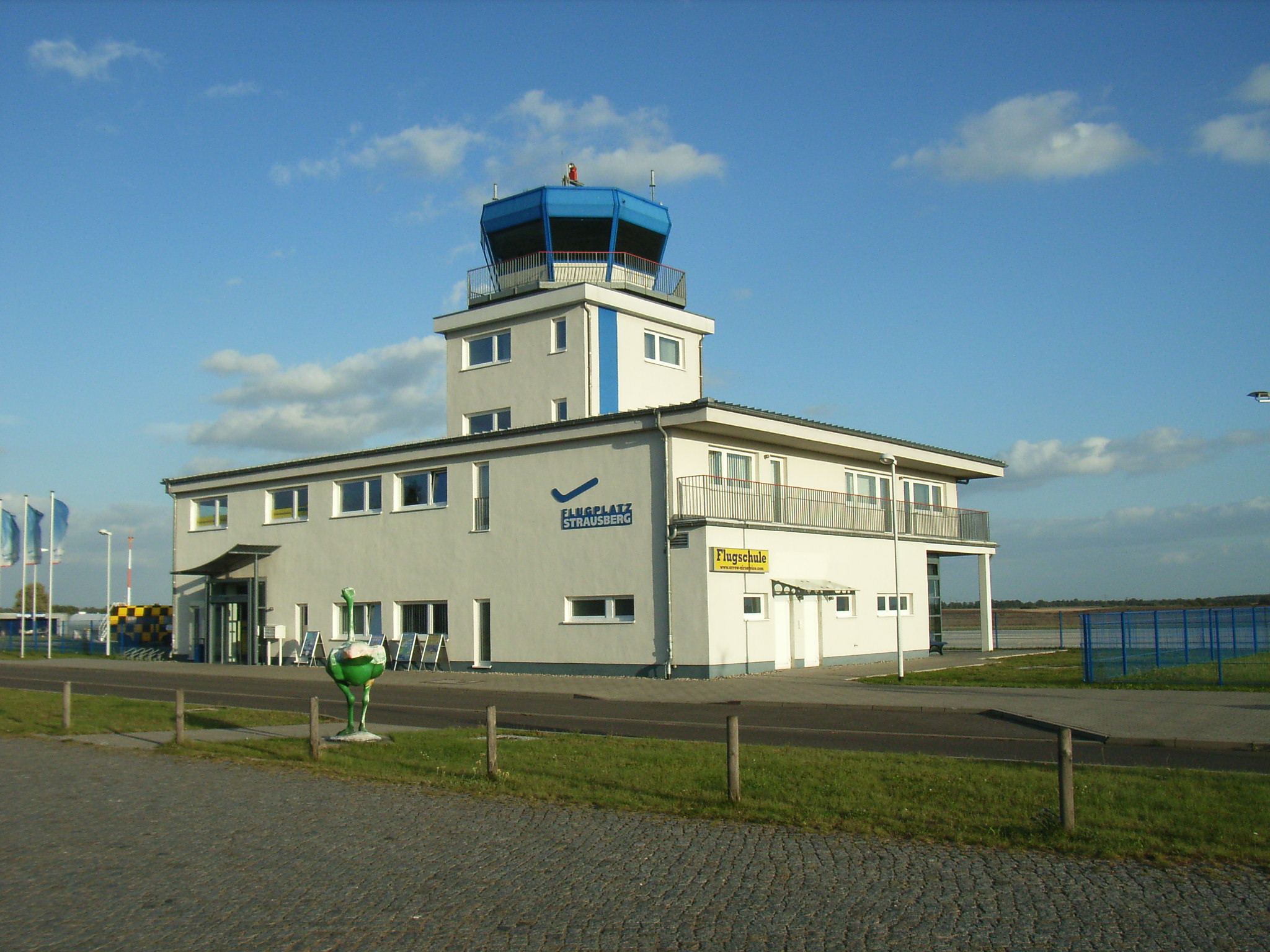
Aerodrome

Strausberg is also served by the Strausberg Railway (Strausberger Eisenbahn), a light rail line with nine stops, which connects the main railway station to the centre of town. Besides the main railway station, the other 8 stops are: Landhausstraße, Schlagmühle, Stadtwald, Hegermühle, Wolfstal, Käthe-Kollwitz-Straße, Elisabethstraße and Lustgarten, the northern terminus. The Strausberg Railway also operates the Straussee Ferry (Strausseefähre), an unusual electrically operated passenger cable ferry across Straussee.

The town has also a small aerodrome ("Flugplatz Strausberg", ICAO: EDAY), opened in 1927, with a runway of 1,200 m × 28 m, and situated 2 kilometres in the east of town centre.

== Sport ==
The local football representative is the FC Strausberg, competing in the fifth tier of German football. Home games of FCS are played at the "Energiearena" stadium.

== Twin towns – sister cities ==
Strausberg is twinned with:

- Dębno, Poland
- Frankenthal, Germany
- Hamont-Achel, Belgium
- Terezín, Czech Republic

== Notable people ==
- Andreas Angelus (1561–1598), clergyman, teacher and chronicler
- Paul Max Bertschy (1840–1911), architect
- Johannes Haw (1871–1949), Roman Catholic priest
- Sigmund Jähn (1937–2019), cosmonaut and pilot
- Siegfried Kasche (1903–1947), Nazi Storm Trooper officer and ambassador executed for war crimes
- Kurt Wagner (1904–1989), general
- Michael Gartenschläger (1944–1976), political prisoner
- Martin Schindler (born 1996), professional darts player

== Bibliography ==
- Rolf Barthel, Michael Haddenhorst: Städte in Deutschland - Strausberg. Nicolaische Verlagsbuchhandlung, Beuermann GmbH, Berlin 1993 ISBN 3-87584-483-1
- Horst Klein: Zur Geschichte der Ortsgruppe der KPD Strausberg 1920 bis 1946 (Thesen), in: Jahrbuch für Forschungen zur Geschichte der Arbeiterbewegung, No. I/2002.
- Horst Klein: 110 Jahre organisierte Arbeiterbewegung - 1887–1997 Sozialdemokraten in Strausberg (Thesen), in: Jahrbuch für Forschungen zur Geschichte der Arbeiterbewegung, No. II/2003.
