= Erik Pardeik =

German politician (born 1990)

Member of the Landtag of Brandenburg
- Incumbent
- Assumed office 17 October 2024
- Preceded by: Elske Hilderbrandt
- Constituency: Märkisch-Oderland II

Personal details
- Born: 1990 (age 35–36)
- Party: Alternative for Germany (since 2013)

Erik Pardeik (born 1990) is a German politician serving as a member of the Landtag of Brandenburg since 2024. He has been a member of the Alternative for Germany since 2013.
