= Kurt Wagner (general) =

- Born: 31 July 1904; Chemnitz, Saxony, Germany
- Died: 8 July 1989 (aged 84) Strausberg, Brandenburg, German Democratic Republic
- Allegiance: East Germany
- Branch: National People's Army
- Service years: 1952-1967
- Rank: Colonel general
- Commands: Deputy Minister of National Defence
- Awards

Kurt Wagner (31 July 1904 – 8 July 1989) was a German soldier and politician who between 1959 and 1967 served as the German Democratic Republic's Deputy Defence Minister.

== Early life ==
Wagner was born in what was then south central Germany in the city of Chemnitz (which in 1953 was officially renamed "Karl-Marx-Stadt"). His father worked as a Tinsmith/plumber and as a lighter of the city's street-lights. He attended junior school from 1911 till 1919 which was followed by three years at a training college. During the 1920s he started an apprenticeship as an electrician and took various skilled and semi-skilled factory jobs. There were also periods of unemployment. He first joined a trades union in 1923.

In 1928 Kurt Wagner learned the trade of a cobble stone-setter with the Chemnitz Tram Company (Chemnitzer Straßenbahngesellschaft), and he then worked at this craft till 1933. In December 1932 he became a member of the Communist party. The next month, in January 1933, the NSDAP (Nazi Party) took power and lost little time in creating a one-party state out of what had previously been an increasingly fractious multi-party democracy in Germany. The Communist Wagner was dismissed from the Tram Company without any notice period in April 1934. By now the Communist Party had been banned in Germany, but Wagner nevertheless continued to work for it as a courier in north Chemnitz, later becoming a district party leader in Chemnitz. He was arrested on 28 March 1935. He was sent for trial at the recently created People's Court in Berlin in July 1935 and sentenced to ten years imprisonment for "high treason". He remained in Waldheim Prison (a short distance to the north-west of Chemnitz) till 24 April 1945. Six of his nearly ten years of incarceration were spent in solitary confinement.

When liberation arrived, it was the Americans who reached Saxony first, and it was the US commander Major Ebbers who mandated Kurt Wagner to set up a city police force in Chemnitz, where between 8 May and 15 July 1945 Wagner, as the local "Kriminaldirektor", was in charge of crime fighting. It had nevertheless already been agreed in the Potsdam Conference between the Americans and Soviets that Saxony would form part of the post-war Soviet occupation zone. The US Third Army accordingly withdrew, and on 2 July 1945 the Soviet army took over Leipzig, the state capital. The Soviet military commander, Nikolai Trufanov, now had Wagner installed as Leipzig police chief in succession to Heinrich Fleißner whom the Soviets suspected of entertaining pro-American sympathies. Kurt Wagner accordingly served as Chief of Police in Leipzig for more than a year, between 16 July 1945 and 16 September 1946.

On 30 July 1946 the German Interior Administration (DVdI / Deutsche Verwaltung des Innern) was created in the Soviet occupation zone with responsibilities that included the national coordination of the new police service. One thing on which the Americans and Soviets had agreed in 1945 was that there was no place for a German army in occupied Germany, but the police service now established in the Soviet zone of Germany was nevertheless in some respects a quasi-military force, and the entire area was by now being developed into East Germany, a state modeled along principals approved in Moscow, and administered separately from the occupation zones to the west, administered by the American, British and French forces. The President of the East German DVdI was the former Police Chief from Thuringia, a man called Erich Reschke. There were three vice-presidents: Kurt Wagner was one of the three, and he was the man responsible for the police.

== NVA service ==
In October 1949 he moved to the Party's Central Academy at Privolsk in the Soviet Union where he undertook twelve months of special training. Between 1950 and 1952 he was in charge of the police station at Hohenstücken, and in July 1952 he was promoted, but still only to the rank of Chief Inspector. Although East Germany did not feel able to create an army till 1956, in October 1952 military service grades were introduced for the Police Service, and in October 1952 Kurt Wagner became a Major General in the Kasernierte Volkspolizei, a police division which would later come to be seen as a precursor to the National People's Army. In 1952 he became Deputy Chief of Staff in the Police Operational Division, shortly afterwards promoted to the Chief of Staff position. There followed another interlude in the Soviet Union where from 1955 till 1957 he attended the General Staff Academy in Moscow and ended up with a degree in Military Sciences. He was placed in charge of East Germany's Military District III, headquartered in Leipzig, in December 1957. At the end of 1959 Kurt Wagner was appointed Deputy Minister for Defence, and on 7 October 1961 he was promoted to the rank of General Lieutenant. On 1 March 1966 be was promoted to General Colonel. A year after that he retired.

Kurt Wagner lived in Strausberg till his death in July 1989, a few months before the German Democratic Republic which he had served over more than four decades ceased to exist as a separate state.
