= Alte Oder =

River in Germany

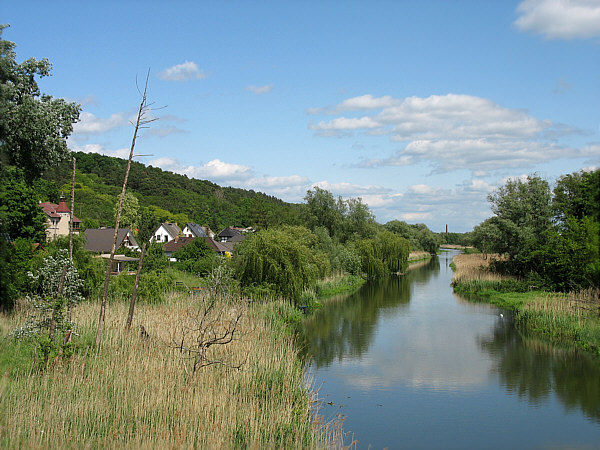
- Alte Oder near Bad Freienwalde

- Location of mouth in Brandenbur

Location
- Country: Germany
- State: Brandenburg

Physical characteristics
- Mouth
  - location: Oder
  - coordinates: 52.8807°N 14.1571°E

Alte Oder is a branch on the river Oder in Brandenburg, Germany. It drains the Oderbruch basin, flowing northwards to the confluence with the Oder near Hohensaaten. It is one of several branches of the Oder named "Alte Oder".

== See also ==
- List of rivers of Brandenburg
