= Garzau-Garzin =

- Municipality
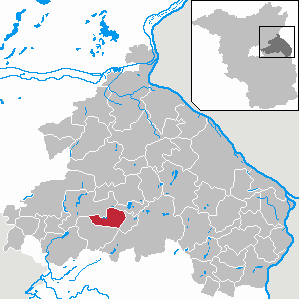
- Location of Garzau-Garzin within Märkisch-Oderland district
- Interactive map of Garzau-Garzin
- Location within Germany Location within Brandenburg
- Coordinates: 52°33′N 13°59′E
- Country: Germany
- State: Brandenburg
- District: Märkisch-Oderland
- Municipal assoc.: Märkische Schweiz
- Subdivisions: 2 Ortsteile

Government
  - Mayor (2024–29): Sebastian Fröbrich

Area
  - Total: 26.08 km^{2} (10.07 sq mi)
- Elevation: 63 m (207 ft)

Population (2025-12-31)
  - Total: 505
  - Density: 19.4/km^{2} (50.2/sq mi)
- Time zone: UTC+01:00 (CET)
  - Summer (DST): UTC+02:00 (CEST)
- Postal codes: 15345
- Dialling codes: 033435
- Vehicle registration: MOL

Garzau-Garzin is a municipality in the district Märkisch-Oderland, in Brandenburg, Germany. It is formed by the villages of Garzau and Garzin.

== Demography ==
Development of Population since 1875 within the Current Boundaries (Blue Line: Population; Dotted Line: Comparison to Population Development of Brandenburg state; Grey Background: Time of Nazi rule; Red Background: Time of Communist rule)

Garzau-Garzin: Population development
within the current boundaries (2013)

Year	Pop.	±% p.a.
1875	550	—
1890	582	+0.38%
1910	586	+0.03%
1925	617	+0.34%
1933	619	+0.04%
1939	572	−1.31%
1946	778	+4.49%
1950	795	+0.54%
1964	622	−1.74%
1971	541	−1.97%
1981	429	−2.29%
1985	430	+0.06%
1989	442	+0.69%
1990	441	−0.23%
1991	432	−2.04%
1992	419	−3.01%
1993	459	+9.55%
1994	458	−0.22%
1995	466	+1.75%
1996	467	+0.21%

Year	Pop.	±% p.a.
1997	473	+1.28%
1998	503	+6.34%
1999	509	+1.19%
2000	511	+0.39%
2001	508	−0.59%
2002	504	−0.79%
2003	500	−0.79%
2004	504	+0.80%
2005	519	+2.98%
2006	511	−1.54%
2007	627	+22.70%
2008	658	+4.94%
2009	662	+0.61%
2010	687	+3.78%
2011	712	+3.64%
2012	725	+1.83%
2013	729	+0.55%
2014	691	−5.21%
2015	716	+3.62%
2016	458	−36.03%

== See also ==
- Märkische Schweiz Nature Park
- Gladowshöhe
