= Buckow =

- Town
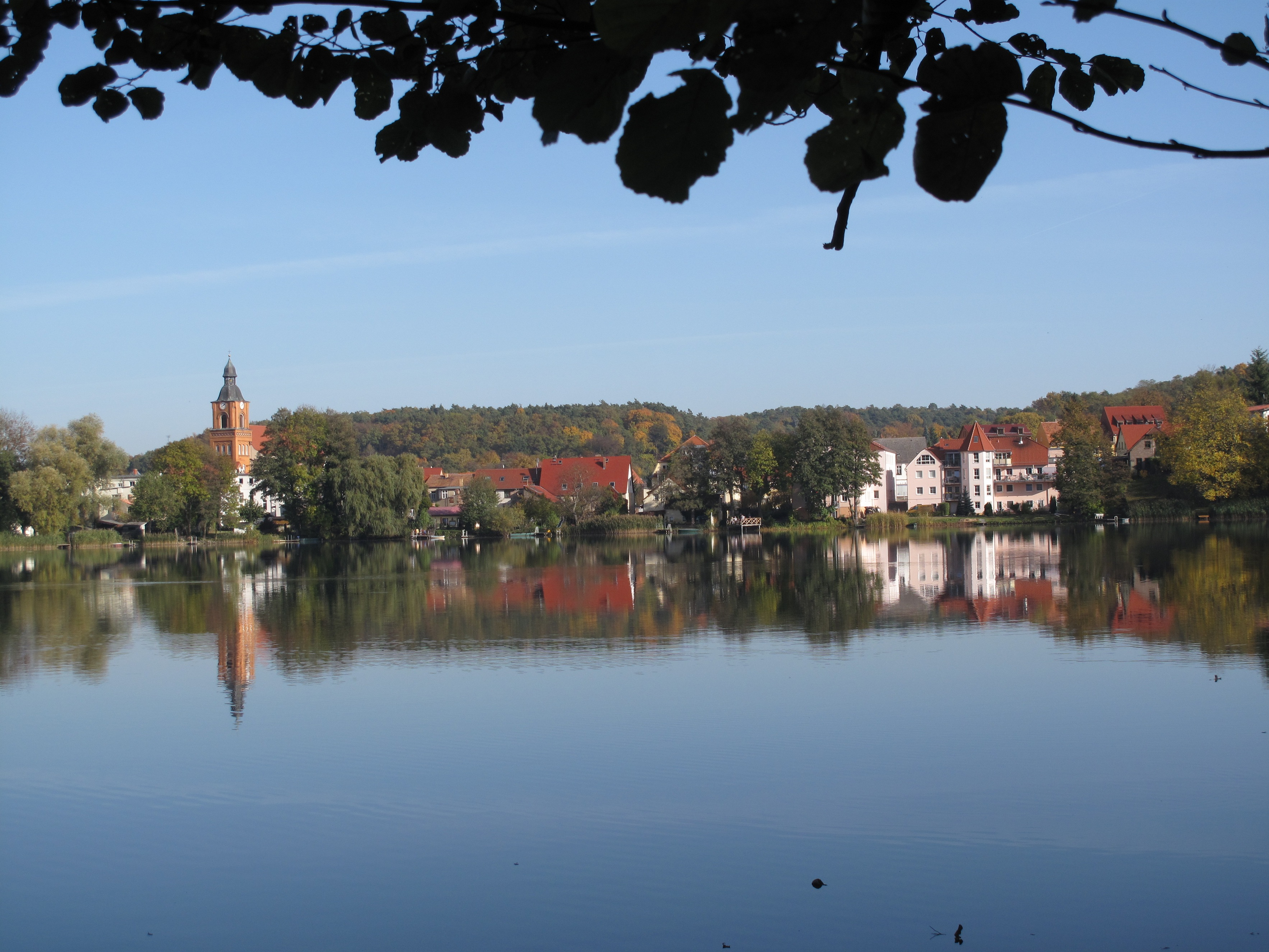
- View from Buckowsee

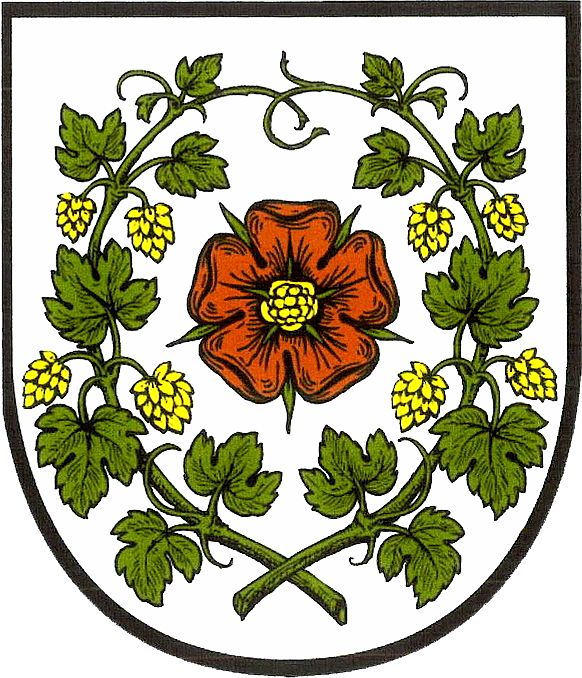
- Coat of arms

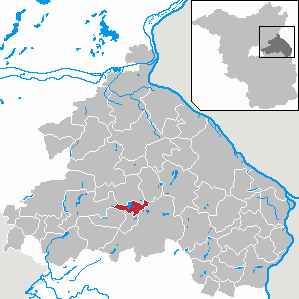
- Location of Buckow within Märkisch-Oderland district
- Interactive map of Buckow
- Location within Germany Location within Brandenburg
- Coordinates: 52°34′N 14°05′E
- Country: Germany
- State: Brandenburg
- District: Märkisch-Oderland
- Municipal assoc.: Märkische Schweiz
- Subdivisions: 2 Ortsteile

Government
  - Mayor (2024–29): Thomas Mix (SPD)

Area
  - Total: 14.42 km^{2} (5.57 sq mi)
- Elevation: 27–40 m (89–131 ft)

Population (2025-12-31)
  - Total: 1,488
  - Density: 103.2/km^{2} (267.3/sq mi)
- Time zone: UTC+01:00 (CET)
  - Summer (DST): UTC+02:00 (CEST)
- Postal codes: 15377
- Dialling codes: 033433
- Vehicle registration: MOL
- Website: www.buckow-online.de

Buckow (German pronunciation: [ˈbʊkoː] or [ˈbuːkoː]) is a town in the Märkisch-Oderland district, in Brandenburg, Germany. The water cure resort is the administrative seat of the Amt (municipal association) Märkische Schweiz and located in the centre of the eponymous hill range, which has been part of the Märkische Schweiz Nature Park protected area since 1990.

== Geography ==
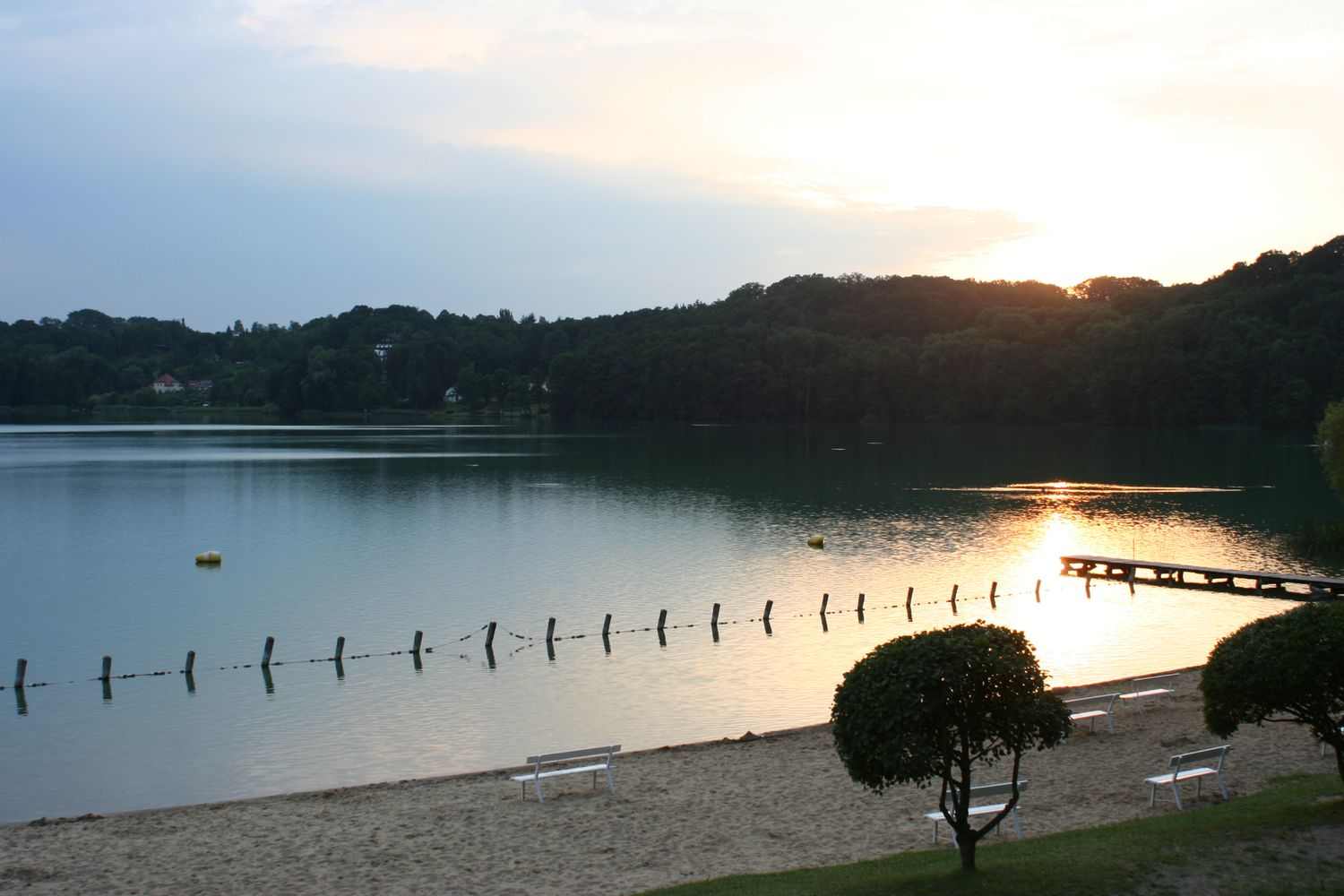
Buckow beach on Schermützelsee

Buckow is located about 8 km (5.0 mi) northwest of Müncheberg and 45 km (28 mi) east of the Berlin city centre. The town is situated in a glacial trough between the Berlin Urstromtal in the southwest and the Oder Valley in the northeast, crossed by the Stobber River with its source in the Rotes Luch lowland. The trough comprises several lakes, of which the Schermützelsee west of the town centre is the largest.

== Overview ==
The town arose at the site of a former Slavic (Wendish) settlement which according to archaeological findings possibly was founded in the mid 9th century, its name referring to the Slavic: buk, "beech". The Märkische Schweiz area was part of Lubusz Land held by Prince Mieszko I of Poland in the late 10th century, which later formed the northwestern part of the Duchy of Silesia. In 1224 the Piast duke Henry I the Bearded granted large estates to the Cistercian monks of Lubiąż (Leubus) and Trzebnica (Trebnitz) Abbeys and had the lands settled with German-speaking colonists.

From about 1249/50 the Ascanian margraves of Brandenburg took control over Lubusz Land, initially rivalling with the Prince-Archbishops of Magdeburg. Buchowe was first mentioned in a 1253 deed issued by Archbishop Rudolf von Dingelstädt. It is also mentioned in the 1375 land register of Emperor Charles IV and was already called an oppidum in a 1405 purchase contract.

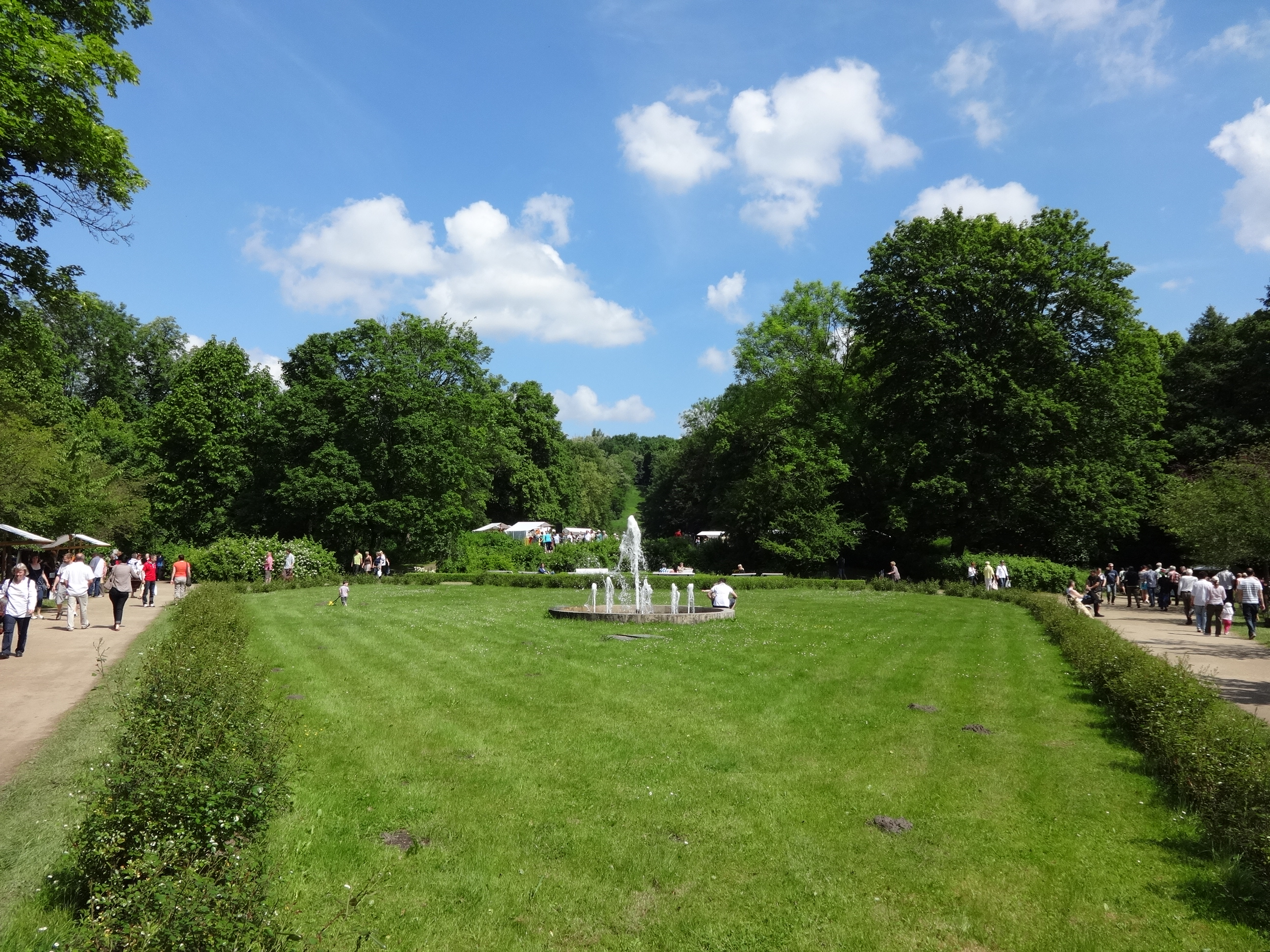
Castle grounds

Buckow was devastated during a Hussite campaign on 17 April 1432. The House of Hohenzollern elector Frederick II of Brandenburg vested the farming citizens with market rights in 1465. During early modern times, Buckow evolved as a centre of hop growing and brewing. The town privileges were officially confirmed in 1550.

In the 17th century the estates were held by the Pfuel noble family and in 1688 were acquired by the Brandenburgian field marshal Heino Heinrich von Flemming, who had the Baroque Buckow Castle erected, which, rebuilt in a 19th-century Neoclassical style according to plans designed by Karl Friedrich Schinkel, was heavily damaged in World War II and demolished in 1948. The extended English landscape gardens have been preserved.

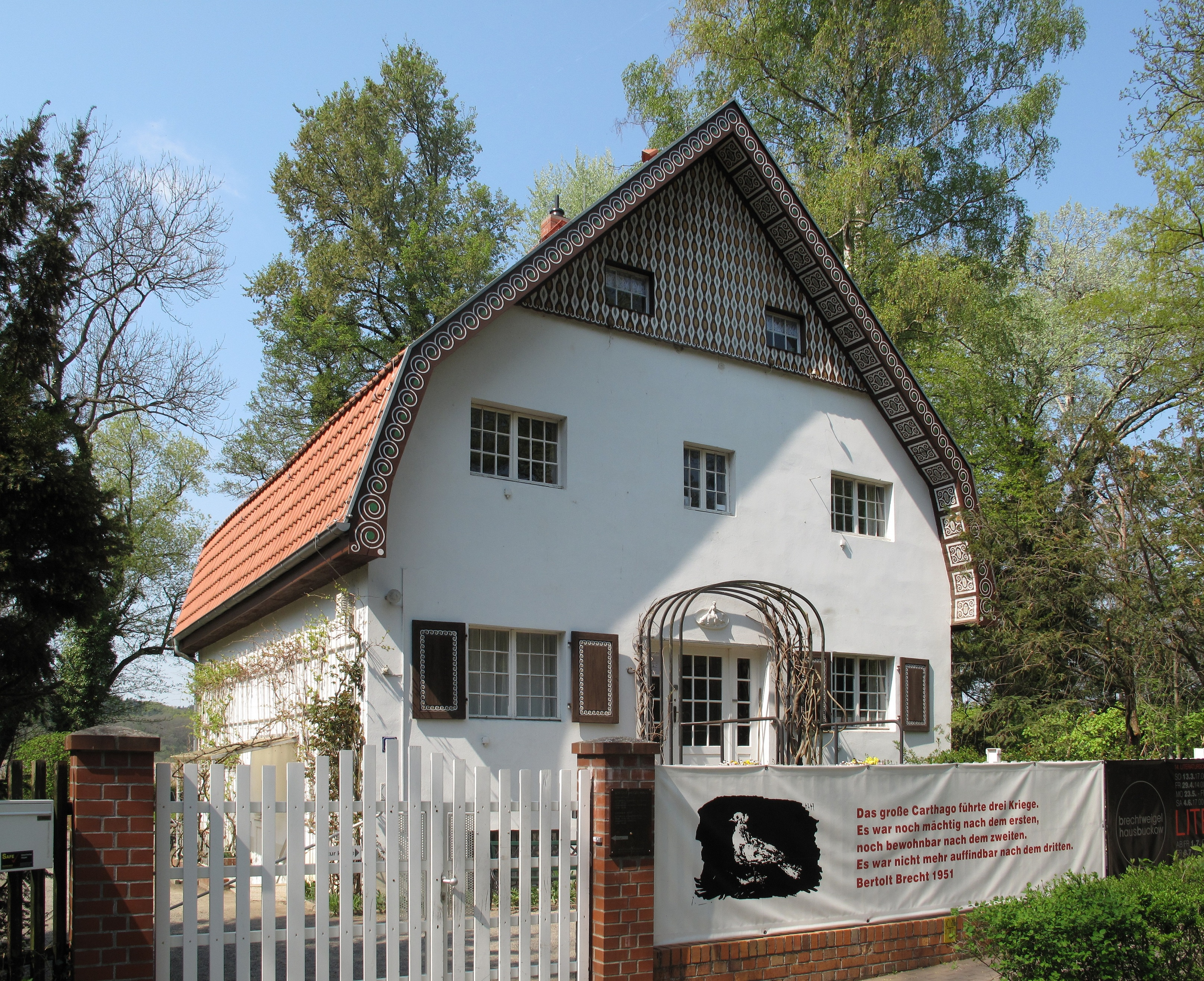
Brecht-Weigel-Haus

With the opening of the Prussian Eastern Railway station at neighbouring Müncheberg in 1865, followed by a direct narrow gauge railway connection to Buckow in 1897, the picturesque setting of the town made it become a popular destination for daytrippers from Berlin and several well-off families had summer cottages erected. The writer Egon Kisch spent holidays there, as did the artist John Heartfield. From 1952 Bertolt Brecht and Helene Weigel had their summer residence in Buckow, where Brecht wrote his Buckow Elegies in response to the Uprising of 1953 in East Germany. The villa today is a memorial site and a place for readings.

== Politics ==
Seats in the municipal assembly (Stadtverordnetenversammlung) as of 2019 local elections:

- Christian Democratic Union (CDU): 3
- Bürger für Buckowç 2
- Social Democratic Party of Germany (SPD): 2
- The Left (Die Linke): 1
- Bürger.Dialog.Buckow: 1
- Pro Zukunft (Independent): 1

== Demography ==
Changes in population since 1875 within the current boundaries (Blue line: Population; Dotted line: Comparison to population development of Brandenburg state; Grey background: Time of Nazi rule; Red background: Time of communist rule)

Buckow (Märkische Schweiz): Population development
within the current boundaries (2013)

Year	Pop.	±% p.a.
1875	1,709	—
1890	1,871	+0.61%
1910	2,127	+0.64%
1925	2,414	+0.85%
1933	2,399	−0.08%
1939	2,302	−0.69%
1946	2,467	+0.99%
1950	2,863	+3.79%
1964	2,537	−0.86%
1971	2,477	−0.34%
1981	2,197	−1.19%
1985	2,093	−1.21%
1989	2,019	−0.90%
1990	1,994	−1.24%
1991	1,930	−3.21%
1992	1,899	−1.61%
1993	1,871	−1.47%
1994	1,886	+0.80%
1995	1,855	−1.64%
1996	1,829	−1.40%

Year	Pop.	±% p.a.
1997	1,800	−1.59%
1998	1,785	−0.83%
1999	1,779	−0.34%
2000	1,713	−3.71%
2001	1,691	−1.28%
2002	1,692	+0.06%
2003	1,655	−2.19%
2004	1,683	+1.69%
2005	1,685	+0.12%
2006	1,659	−1.54%
2007	1,642	−1.02%
2008	1,610	−1.95%
2009	1,633	+1.43%
2010	1,602	−1.90%
2011	1,508	−5.87%
2012	1,487	−1.39%
2013	1,500	+0.87%
2014	1,466	−2.27%
2015	1,510	+3.00%
2016	1,490	−1.32%

== International relations ==
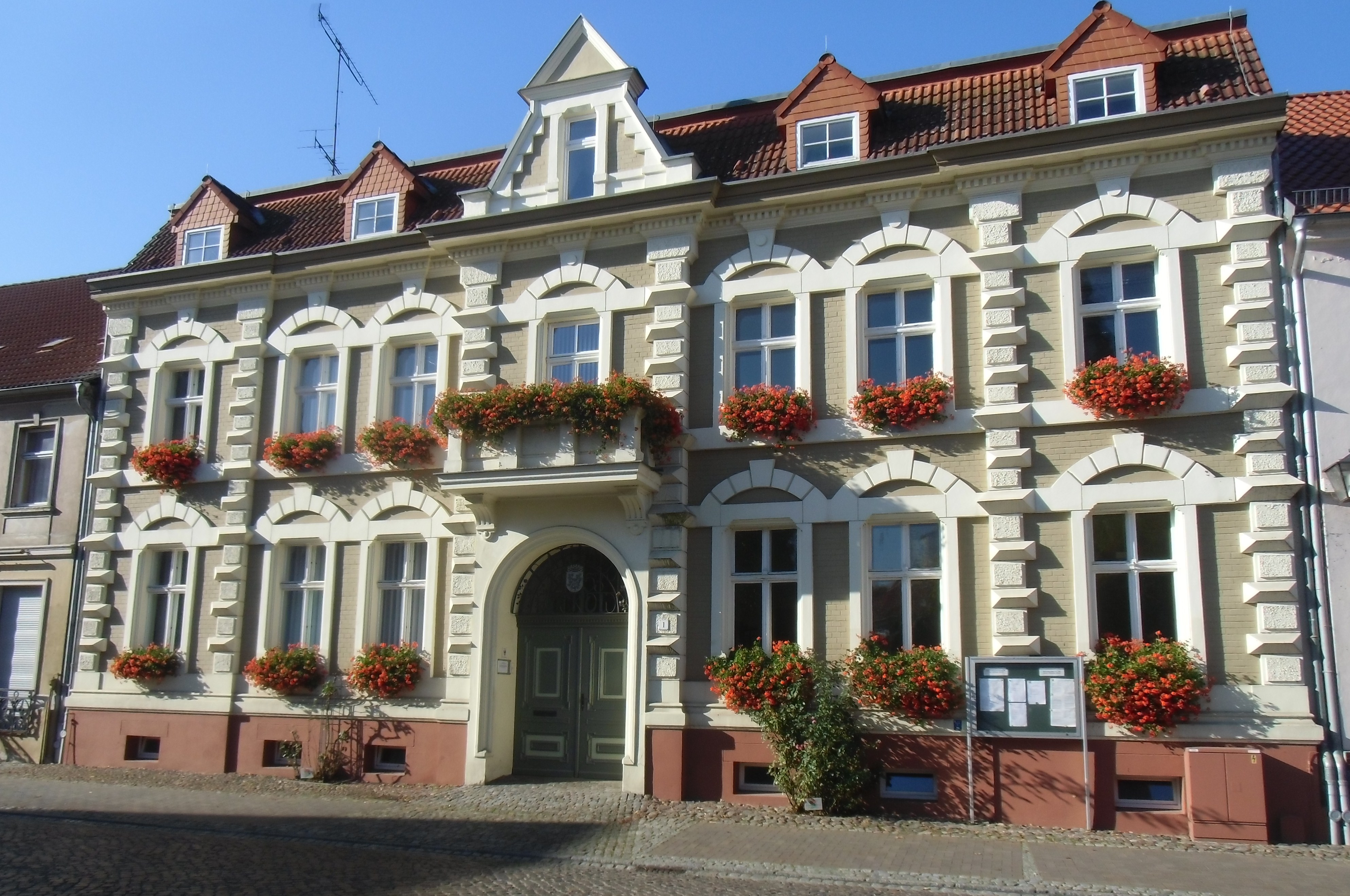
Town hall

Buckow is twinned with:

- Brilon, Germany
- Łagów, Świebodzin County, Poland
- (Republic of Ireland) Adare (Áth Dara), Ireland

== Personalities ==
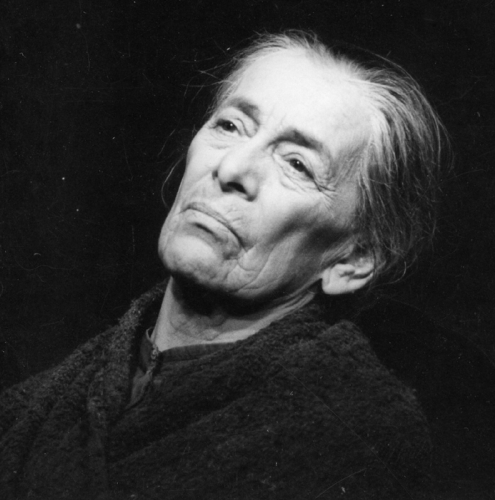
Helene Weigel 1967

- Theodor Fontane (1819–1898), author, wrote in the Wanderungen durch die Mark Brandenburg in volume 2 "The Oderland" about Buckow
- Bertolt Brecht (1898–1956), writer, lived in Buckow in 1952-1956
- Helene Weigel, (1900–1971), actress, lived in Buckow in 1952-1971
- Ralf Dahrendorf (1929–2009), sociologist and politician, attended a boarding school in Buckow from 1941 to 1944
