= Märkische Schweiz Nature Park =

Nature park and reserve in Märkisch-Oderland, Brandenburg, Germany

Coordinates: 52°34′27″N 14°05′07″E

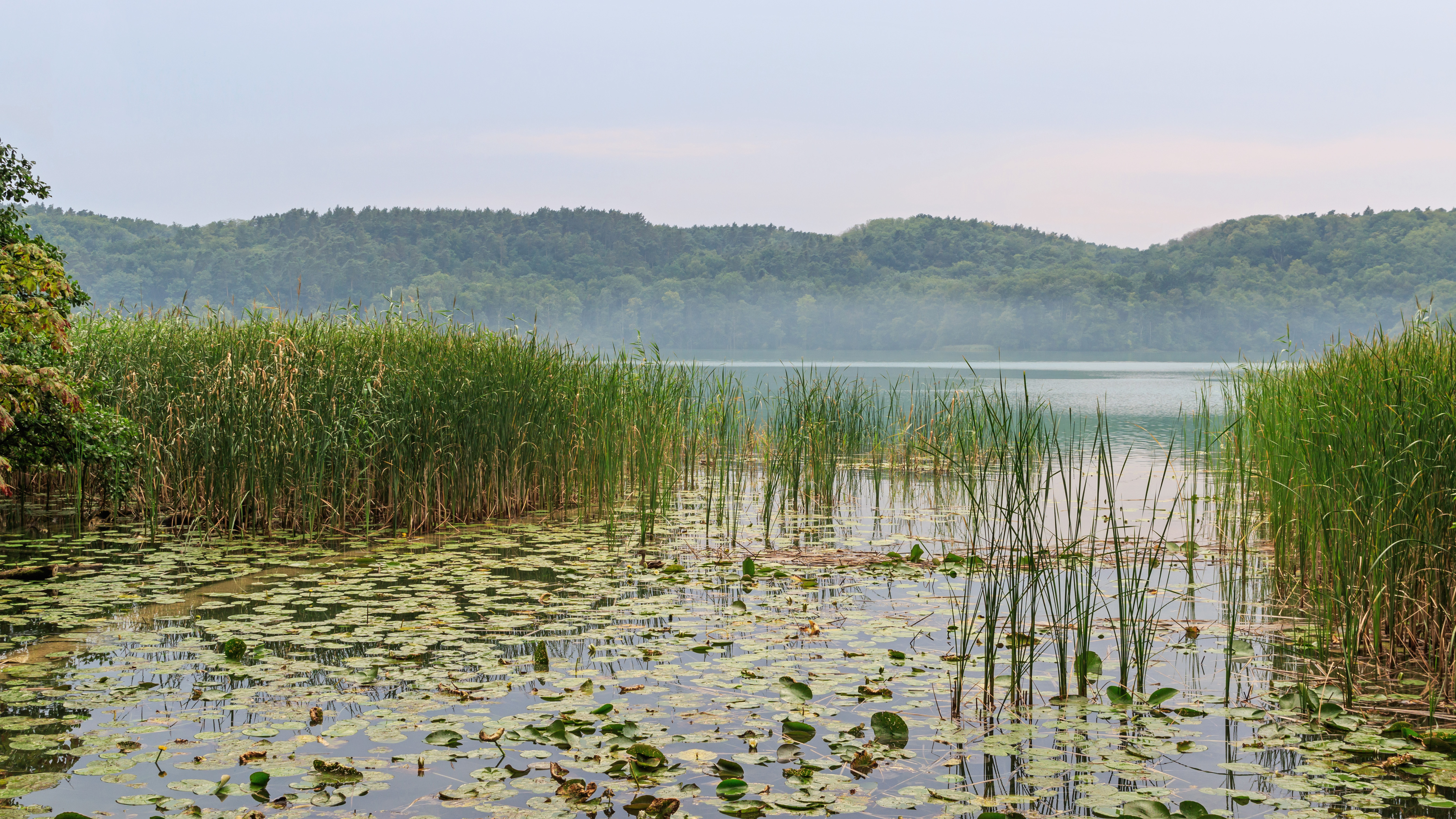

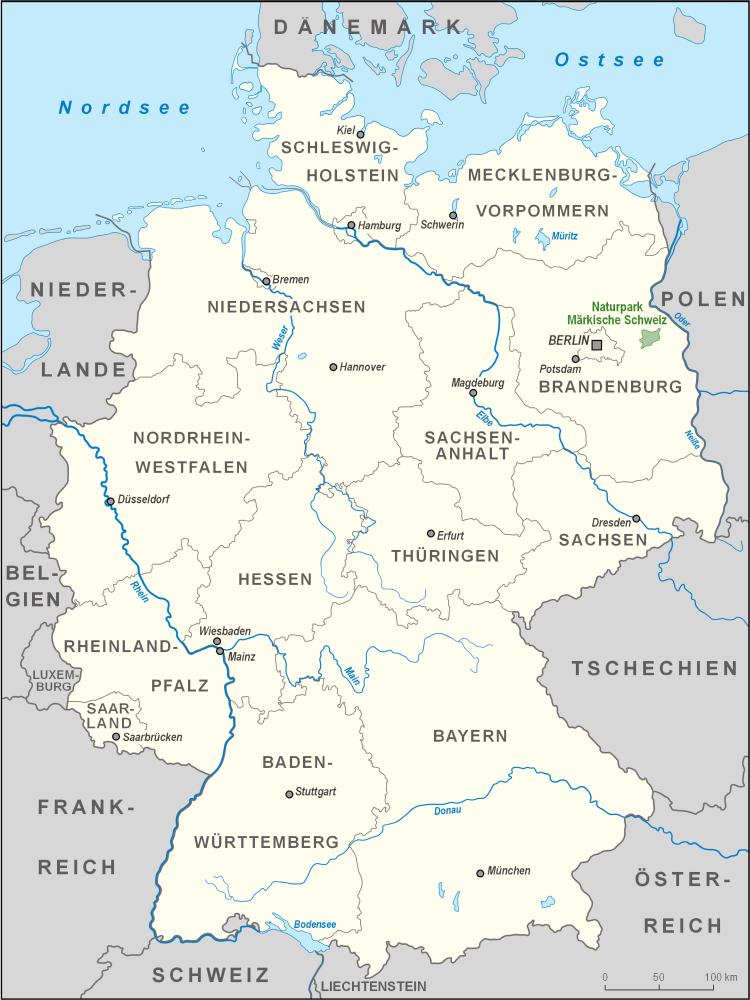

Märkische Schweiz Nature Park is a nature park and reserve in the district of Märkisch-Oderland, in Brandenburg, Germany. It covers an area of 204 km^{2} (79 sq mi). It was established on October 1, 1990, and is located east of Berlin.

The park's main river is the Stobber. With a surface area of 1.37 km^{2} the Schermützelsee is its largest lake.
