= 171st Rifle Division =

171st Rifle Division (September 18, 1939 - December 27, 1941) 171st Rifle Division (December 1941 - December 1945)
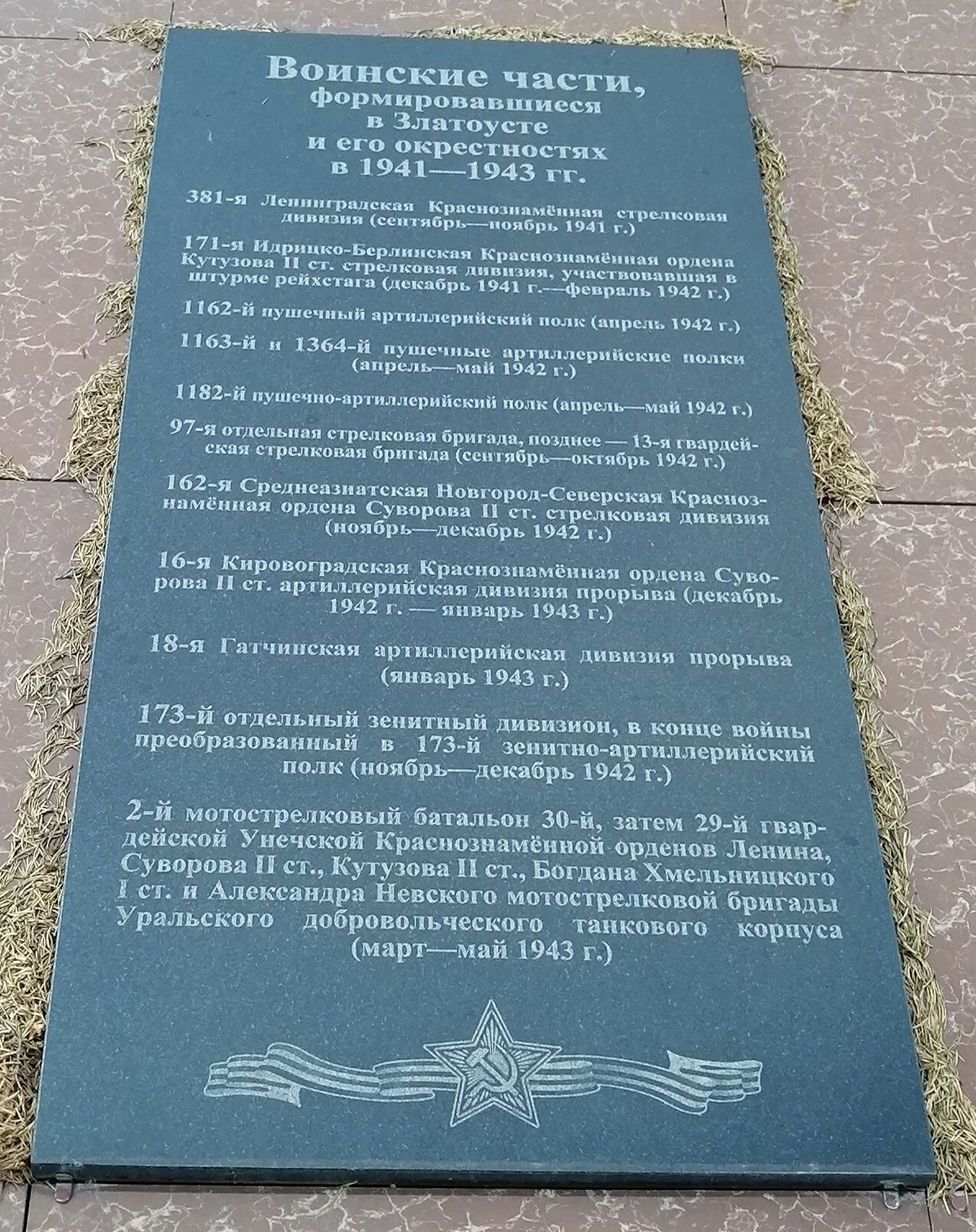
- Memorial plaque in Zlatoust which lists the 2nd Formation of the 171st near the top
- Active: 1939–1945
- Country: Soviet Union
- Branch: Red Army
- Type: Infantry
- Size: Division
- Engagements: Battle of Kiev (1941); Demyansk Pocket; Demyansk Offensive (1943); Battle of Nevel (1943); Pskov-Ostrov offensive Baltic offensive Riga offensive (1944); Vistula–Oder offensive East Pomeranian offensive Battle of Berlin
- Decorations: Order of the Red Banner (2nd Formation); Order of Kutuzov (2nd Formation)
- Battle honours: Idritsa; Berlin (both 2nd Formation)

Commanders
- Notable commanders: Maj. Gen. Aleksandr Efimovich Budykho; Col. Bogumil Iosifovich Zobin; Col. Mikhail Emmanuilovich Moskalik; Col. Sergei Ivanovich Aksyonov; Col. Aleksandr Ivanovich Malchevskii; Col. Aleksei Ignatevich Negoda

The 171st Rifle Division was originally formed as an infantry division of the Red Army in the North Caucasus Military District on September 18, 1939, based on the shtat (table of organization and equipment) of that same month. It was in the Kharkov Military District at the time of the German invasion, and it was soon moved to the northwest of Kyiv as part of Southwestern Front. It would remain defending the Ukrainian capital into September, eventually as part of 37th Army, when it was deeply encircled and destroyed.

A new 171st was designated in January 1942, based on a 400-series division that had begun forming the previous month in the Ural Military District. After several months to complete formation and training the division was railed to Northwestern Front where it joined 34th Army near Demyansk. Over the next ten months it mostly held the line containing the German forces in the pocket around that town, occasionally participating in unsuccessful attacks against well-prepared defenses. In February 1943 the 171st was moved to 27th Army in the same Front just as Army Group North was evacuating the salient, but returned to 34th Army in April. During the summer and early autumn it fought local actions along the Lovat River, briefly as part of 1st Shock Army, before being moved west to 2nd Baltic Front in November, joining 79th Rifle Corps in 3rd Shock Army, where it would remain for the duration. After spending the winter and spring of 1944 deep in the Nevel salient, in July it took part in the Pskov-Ostrov Offensive and quickly won a battle honor for its role in the liberation of Idritsa. Shortly after it was also awarded the Order of the Red Banner after the fall of the Latvian city of Rēzekne. It continued to advance through Latvia into November, but was then redeployed with the rest of 3rd Shock to 1st Belorussian Front east of Warsaw. During the winter offensive into Poland the Army was initially in reserve but moved into the line in order to close the gap that had developed between 1st and 2nd Belorussian Fronts in East Pomerania. During this operation two of the 171st's regiments and the division as a whole received awards. After it concluded 3rd Shock was reinforced and redeployed into the bridgehead over the Oder River at Küstrin just prior to the Berlin offensive. This operation began on April 16, with the division in the first echelon of its Corps, as 3rd Shock smashed through several German defense lines before entering the northeastern borough of Pankow and the central district of Moabit. On April 29, 79th Corps was assigned the task of capturing the central governmental area, including the symbolic Reichstag building, which had been a burnt-out ruin since 1933. The 171st crossed the Spree River under cover of darkness in two places, and then cooperated with the 150th Rifle Division in consolidating the bridgehead. During April 30 the 380th and 525th Regiments both played leading roles in taking the Ministry of Internal Affairs building; the latter then moved on to clear a block of buildings to the northeast while the 380th pressed on toward the Reichstag. This regiment's 1st Battalion penetrated the building in the early afternoon along with two battalions of the 150th while the 2nd Battalion, along with the 185th Antitank Battalion, repelled one of the last German counterattacks. On May 2 the division, along with several of its subunits, were awarded the battle honor of "Berlin". Later that month it became part of the Group of Soviet Forces in Germany, along with the rest of 3rd Shock Army, and by December it had been converted to the 16th Mechanized Division, which was disbanded in 1947.

== 1st Formation ==
The division first began forming on September 18, 1939, in the North Caucasus Military District, based on a cadre from the 38th Rifle Division. Its order of battle on June 22, 1941, was as follows:

- 380th Rifle Regiment
- 525th Rifle Regiment
- 713th Rifle Regiment
- 357th Light Artillery Regiment
- 478th Howitzer Artillery Regiment
- 121st Antiaircraft Battalion
- 131st Reconnaissance Battalion
- 120th Sapper Battalion
- 140th Signal Battalion
- 119th Medical/Sanitation Battalion
- 183rd Chemical Defense (Anti-gas) Platoon
- 138th Motor Transport Battalion
- 114th Field Bakery
- 205th Field Postal Station
- 222nd Field Office of the State Bank

Kombrig Aleksandr Efimovich Budykho had been appointed to command the new division on August 19, even before it began forming. This officer had been serving as assistant commander of the 38th Division since the previous October and his rank would be modernized to major general on June 5, 1940. He would remain in command of the first formation for its entire existence.

At the start of the German invasion the 171st was part of 34th Rifle Corps in 19th Army, but as it moved toward the front it came under direct command of Southwestern Front by the start of July, and by July 10 it was in the rebuilding 27th Rifle Corps of the same Front, along with the 28th Mountain Rifle Division.

=== Defense of Kyiv ===
The 13th and 14th Panzer Divisions reached the Irpin River west of Kyiv on July 11 after breaking through Southwestern Front near Zhytomyr. The German command was divided on plans to directly attack Kyiv to seize its crossings over the Dniepr River, but by July 13 German reconnaissance made it clear that Soviet fortifications and troop concentrations ruled out any possibility of taking the city by surprise. Kyiv would remain in Soviet hands for more than two further months. At about the same time the 27th Corps, after concentrating in the Yasnohorodka area, moved into positions along a line west of Irpin, with the 171st on the east and the 28th further west. The two divisions entered combat with German infantry and tanks on July 16 along a sector from Nalivaykovka to Makarov, which continued for several days.

On July 24 the 171st, along with units of the Kiev Fortified Region, foiled a German attack by elements of XXIX Army Corps of German 6th Army and took up positions on the line Zabuyanye–Gole–Druzhnya–Borodyanka. This was the first of many such attempts to capture Kyiv during late July and into early August but all of these were unsuccessful. On August 8 the division, with one regiment of 28th Mountain, dug in along a line from Vishnyakov to Druzhnya. This line stretched due west from Hostomel. 27th Corps (now also containing the 87th Rifle Division) was subordinated to 37th Army on August 21, and by the beginning of September the Corps headquarters was being disbanded. Meanwhile, on August 21 the 171st began its withdrawal across the Dniepr at two crossing points, with the 713th Rifle Regiment and one battalion of the 294th Artillery Regiment acting as rearguard. These were attacked by advance elements of the 111th Infantry and 11th Panzer Divisions on August 23 and scattered, but the main body of the division crossed successfully.

Despite this, the 171st was in a very precarious position. In the last days of August the 2nd Panzer Group and 2nd Army of Army Group Center began their drives southward. By September 10 the remnants of 5th and 37th Armies were grouped north of Kozelets but on September 16 the 2nd Panzers linked up with the 1st Panzer Group of Army Group South well to the east and the Army was deeply encircled. On September 21 the division was isolated from the rest of its Army, and the following day General Budykho was seriously wounded and taken prisoner. Only individuals and small groups were able to reach friendly territory over the following weeks and months. In common with most of the encircled divisions of Southwestern Front it officially remained on the books until December 27, when it was finally written off.

The subsequent fate of Budykho was unusual. After recovering from his wounds in June 1942 he volunteered to join the newly-formed Russian Liberation Army. In October 1943 he was sent with his unit to the Leningrad area, where he almost immediately "deserted" to the 4th Leningrad Partisan Brigade. Within weeks he was discovered by higher authorities and arrested. He was condemned to death for treason, a sentence that was finally carried out on April 19, 1950.

== 2nd Formation ==
The 440th Rifle Division began forming in December 1941 at Zlatoust in the Ural Military District. The next month it was redesignated as the new 171st Rifle Division. Its order of battle was generally similar to that of the 1st formation:

- 380th Rifle Regiment
- 525th Rifle Regiment
- 713th Rifle Regiment
- 357th Artillery Regiment
- 185th Antitank Battalion
- 131st Reconnaissance Company
- 137th Sapper Battalion
- 140th Signal Battalion (later 893rd Signal Company)
- 119th Medical/Sanitation Battalion
- 537th Chemical Defense (Anti-gas) Platoon
- 90th Motor Transport Company
- 453rd Field Bakery
- 918th Divisional Veterinary Hospital
- 2831st Field Postal Station (later 1674th)
- 1095th Field Office of the State Bank

Col. Bogumil Iosifovich Zobin was appointed to command on January 21. The division had a relatively generous amount of time to form up and train as it remained in the Urals until April, when it began moving west to join the 34th Army in Northwestern Front.

== Battle of Demyansk ==
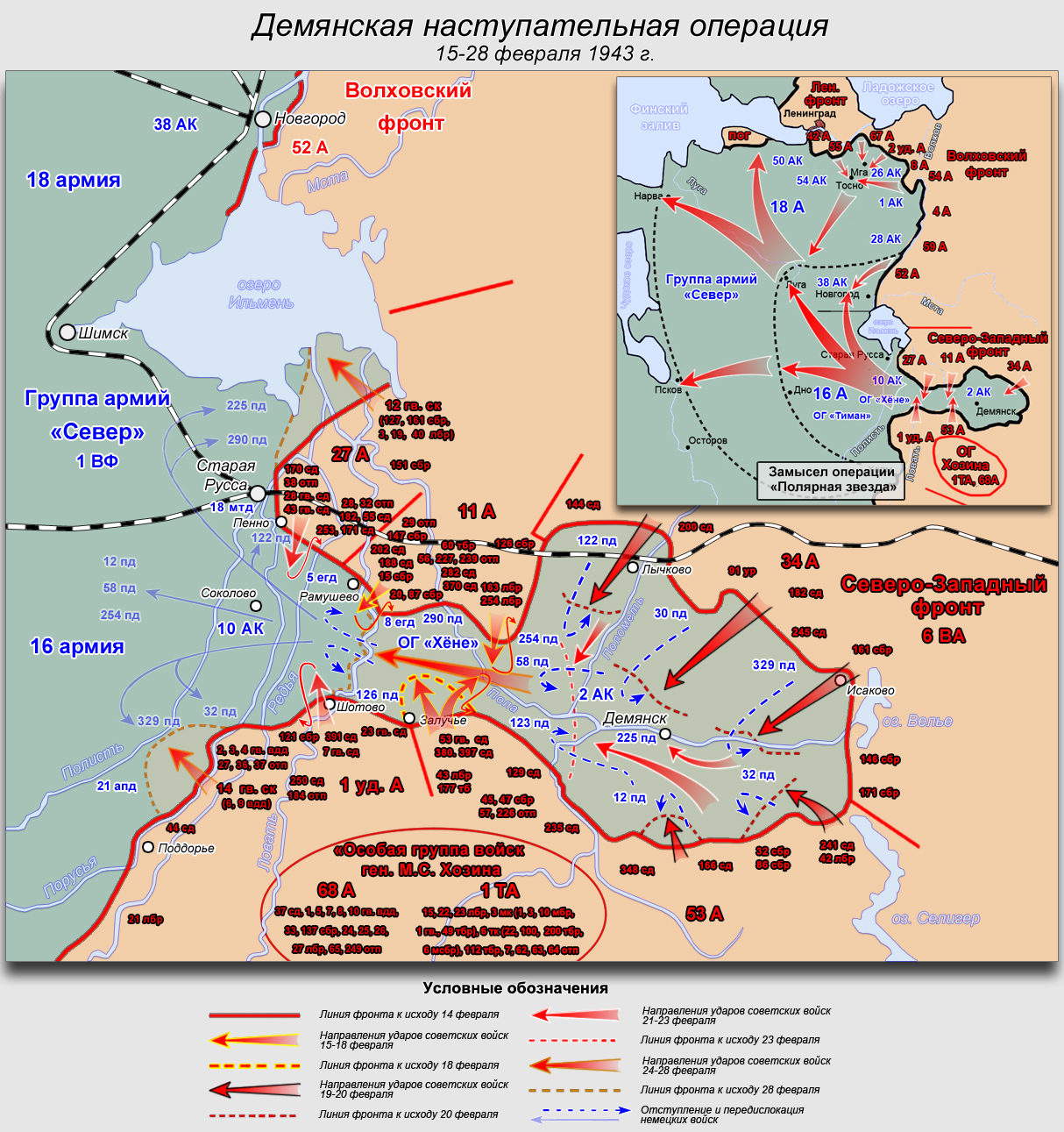
Demyansk Pocket, February 1943. Note position of the 171st north of Ramushevo in 27th Army's sector.

Forces of this Front had isolated the II Army Corps of 16th Army in a pocket centered on Demyansk on February 25, but on April 21 a narrow corridor had been pushed through the village of Ramushevo from inside and out. Because the corridor was still under Soviet artillery fire it was not sufficient as a line of communications, and II Corps continued to rely on air supply for most of its needs through the remainder of the battle. Northwestern Front was under command of Lt. Gen. P. A. Kurochkin and at this time consisted of four Armies (1st Shock, 11th, 53rd and 34th). Maj. Gen. N. E. Berzarin was in command of the latter.

A first effort to cut the corridor was made in May by 1st Shock and 11th Armies, but this did not directly involve the 34th, which was positioned around the northeastern sector of the pocket. In June the 27th Army was added to the Front's forces, but a further effort to sever the corridor in July was unsuccessful. The STAVKA was now questioning the leadership of Kurochkin and Marshal S. K. Timoshenko was called on to supervise the next effort. This took place in August and involved 34th Army making local attacks, but these were easily beaten off by the well-fortified II Corps. Timoshenko took over the Front officially on November 17. What turned out to be a final effort to cut the corridor began in late December, but this concluded in another failure by January 13, 1943, after which the 34th and 53rd Armies went over to the attack with similar results. In mid-February the 171st was located on 34th Army's left flank.

=== Operation Ziethen ===
On February 20 Colonel Zobin left the division and was replaced by Col. Mikhail Emmanuilovich Moskalik. Since the start of the war this officer had led the 75th Cavalry and the 384th and 200th Rifle Divisions. At about the same time the division began a long move around the Demyansk perimeter to join 27th Army, which was located roughly between Ramushevo and Staraya Russa. Marshal G. K. Zhukov's Operation Polar Star had begun on February 10, but the strategic situation changed on February 17 when Operation Ziethen, the evacuation of the Demyansk salient, began on February 17. The forces of II Corps immediately began to reinforce the German lines near Ramushevo, Staraya Russa, and Lake Ilmen and Polar Star was effectively stillborn. Demyansk itself was evacuated on February 21, and by early March the German forces had taken up prepared defenses on the west bank of the Lovat River.

=== Service along the Lovat ===
In April the 171st returned to 34th Army. On May 8 Colonel Moskalik left the division to take over the 7th Guards Rifle Division, which he would lead for the duration of the war, being promoted to the rank of major general on October 16. He was replaced by Col. Sergei Ivanovich Aksyonov, who had previously served as deputy commander of the 156th Rifle Division and briefly as commander of the 170th Rifle Division. In August the 171st joined 14th Guards Rifle Corps, still in 34th Army. Colonel Aksyonov left the division on September 30 to take command of the new 119th Guards Rifle Division. Col. Aleksandr Vasilevich Porkhachyov held interim command from October 4–18, when Col. Aleksandr Ivanovich Malchevskii took over. This officer had previously led the 15th Guards Naval Rifle Brigade, one of the units that had been used to form the 119th Guards. In the same month the 171st was moved to the 90th Rifle Corps of 1st Shock Army, still in Northwestern Front, before it made a more substantial move the next month, now to the 79th Rifle Corps of 3rd Shock Army in 2nd Baltic Front. It would remain under these Corps and Army commands for the duration of the war.

=== Battle of Nevel ===
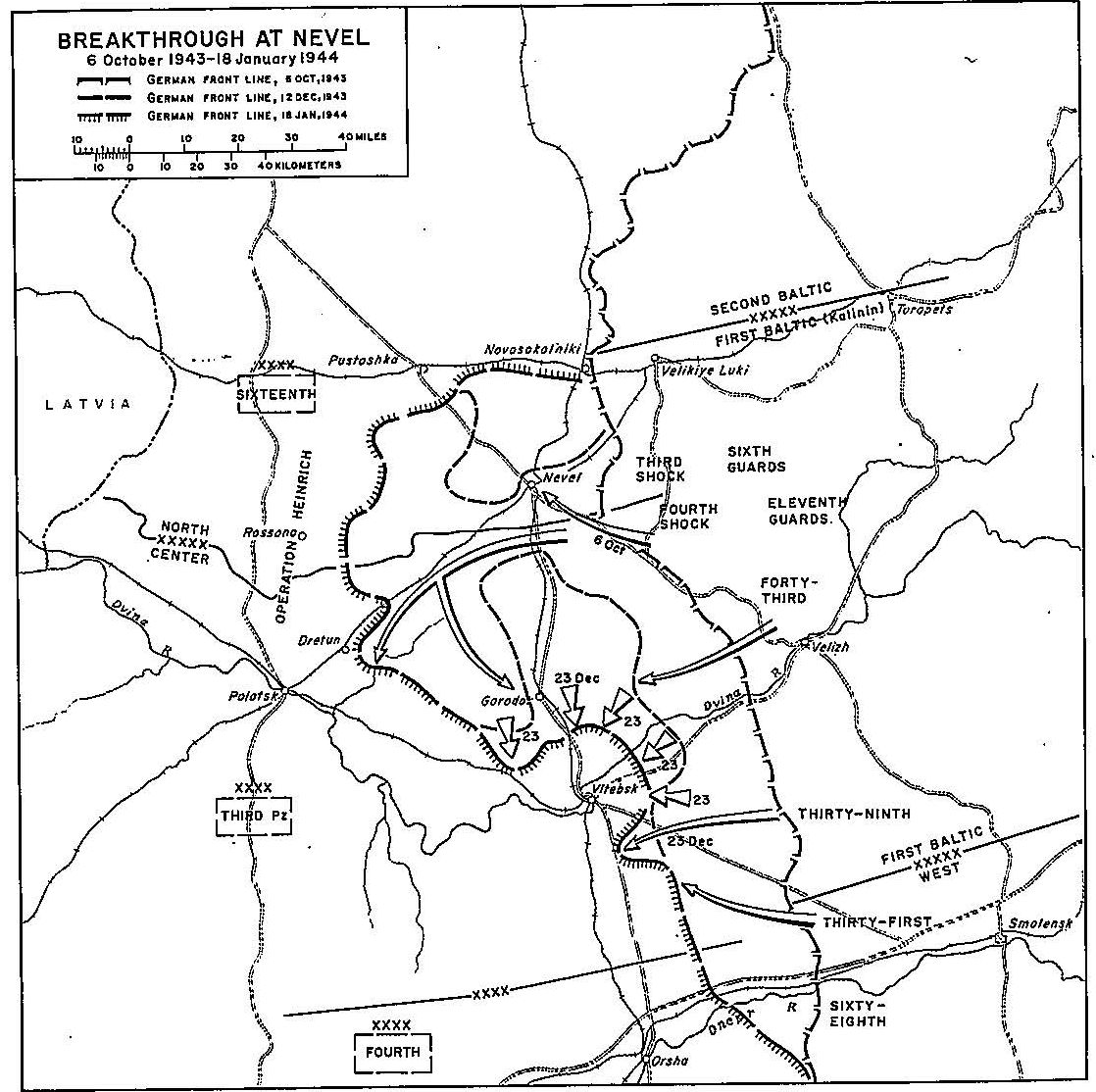
Map of Battle of Nevel (October 1943 - January 1944)

On October 6 the 3rd and 4th Shock Armies had launched an offensive at the boundary between Army Groups North and Center and achieved a surprise success, liberating the town of Nevel, some 25 km behind German lines, on the first day. Through the next weeks and into November 3 Shock expanded its penetration to the north in the direction of Novosokolniki, Idritsa, and Pustoshka behind the forces of 16th Army, while the two Army Groups unsuccessfully attempted to close the gap. The STAVKA finally shut down the offensive on November 21 as none of these objectives had been reached.

In early December, 2nd Baltic held the north half of the Nevel salient with 3rd Shock and 6th Guards Armies from outside Pustoshka to outside Novosokolniki. 79th Corps, which now consisted of the 171st and 219th Rifle Divisions, backed by 28th Rifle Division, defended the west flank of the salient from the boundary with 1st Baltic Front to just south of Pustoshka, facing 16th Army's VIII Army Corps. On December 9 the STAVKA ordered the Front to pierce their defenses at Pustoshka, capture Idritsa, and destroy the German forces in the salient between Nevel and Novosokolniki. This effort began on December 16 but after several days failed to make any gains and was shut down.

== Baltic Offensives ==
Colonel Malchevskii left the division on April 29, 1944, to attend the Voroshilov Academy. He would take over the 110th Guards Rifle Division in the spring of 1945 and lead it until after the end of the war in Europe; he remained in service until 1961, reaching the rank of lieutenant general. Col. Aleksei Ignatevich Negoda took over the 171st and would lead it into the postwar. This officer had previously commanded the 127th Rifle Brigade and the 150th Rifle Division. 79th Corps now consisted of the 150th, 171st and 207th Rifle Divisions, as it would for the remainder of the war. 2nd Baltic began the Pskov-Ostrov Offensive on July 10; the 171st was deployed due west of Pustoshka facing the defenses of the Panther Line along the Alolya River. Two days later the division won its first battle honor:

IDRITSA... 171st Rifle Division (Colonel Negoda, Aleksei Ignatevich)... The troops who participated in the breakthrough of the enemy’s defenses northwest and west of Novosokolniki, and the liberation of Idritsa, by the order of the Supreme High Command of 12 July 1944, and a commendation in Moscow, are given a salute of 20 artillery salvoes from 224 guns.

Within a few days the division crossed the border into Latvia.

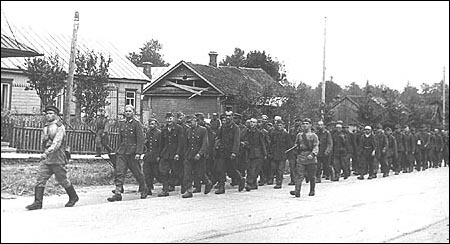
German PoWs march through Rēzekne in July 1944.

The city of Rēzekne was cleared of German forces on July 27 and the 171st was recognized for its role when it received the Order of the Red Banner on August 9. As 3rd Shock continued to advance, by the second week of September it was approaching Krustpils en route to Riga. Leaving that city to other forces, by the first week of October the Army was in the vicinity of Iecava. On November 29 the commander of the 1st Belorussian Front, Marshal Zhukov, received the following:

By order of the Supreme Commander-in-Chief, the following are being transferred to you by railroad:... b) 3rd Shock Army, consisting of:... 79th Rifle Corps (150th, 171st and 207th Rifle Divisions)... along with reinforcements, service establishments and rear organs. The army will arrive approximately between 11 December and 10 January at Lublin station.

A further directive on December 7 ordered that the personnel strength of the Army's nine rifle divisions be reinforced to 6,500 men each, as well as 900 horses.

== Into Poland and Germany ==
At the start of the Vistula-Oder Offensive in January 1945, 3rd Shock was serving as the reserve of 1st Belorussian Front. It was concentrated in the area of Pilawa–Garwolin–Łaskarzew and was to cross the Vistula in the wake of 1st and 2nd Guards Tank Armies and 7th Guards Cavalry Corps on the third day of the operation. On the morning of the fifth day it was to move in the general direction of Nowe Miasto, Rawa Mazowiecka, Jeżów, and Stryków in preparation to develop the advance in the general direction of Poznań. This plan was largely followed successfully. On January 26 Zhukov reported to the STAVKA on his intentions to develop the offensive and force the Oder River. For its part 3rd Shock was to attack in the general direction of Hofstedt, Gross Spiegel, Repplin and Fiddichow, with the objectives of reaching a line through Hofstedt on the first day, reaching the line of the Oder on the sixth day, and then make a crossing in sector Harz–Schwedt before proceeding to Fiddichow. In the event this plan was largely abandoned due to the growing gap between 1st and 2nd Belorussian Fronts and the German threat to the flanks, which led to the East Pomeranian Offensive.

=== East Pomeranian Offensive ===
Three armies of 2nd Belorussian renewed their offensive on February 10. 70th Army was on the Front's left flank, sharing a boundary with 3rd Shock on 1st Belorussian's right. Working together, the two Armies made a fighting advance up to 40 km in five days, with 70th Army seizing Chojnice on February 14. Apart from this, the right flank armies of 1st Belorussian made very little progress during the first half of February against stiff resistance from German 11th Army. Before the offensive was renewed on February 24 most of 3rd Shock was relieved by 2nd Belorussian's 19th Army. Zhukov now concentrated his shock group on the sector Merkisch Friedland–Arnswalde, with the objective of splitting 11th Army and reaching the Baltic coast and the Oder from Kolberg to Altdamm to Zeden. Kolberg was reached on March 4, and Altdamm was taken on March 20, after which the Front began to redeploy for the Berlin Offensive. As a result of this campaign the division as a whole was awarded the Order of Kutuzov, 2nd Degree, for the successful fighting for Gollnov and other towns in Pomerania, 525th Rifle Regiment was given the honorific "Pomerania", and the 357th Artillery received the Order of Bogdan Khmelnitsky, 2nd Degree, for its part in capturing several towns, including Bärwalde, Tempelburg, and Falkenburg. These decorations were awarded on April 26.

== Berlin Offensive ==
At the start of the final offensive on the German capital the 3rd Shock Army, now under command of Col. Gen. V. I. Kuznetsov, was deployed in the bridgehead over the Oder at Küstrin on a 11 km-wide sector from Ortwig to Letschin. In the days just before the attack commenced the 171st was one of six divisions of the Army that relieved the right-flank divisions of 5th Shock Army. Kuznetsov planned to make his main strike with his left flank, a 6 km sector from Amt Kienitz to Letschin. 79th Corps consisted of the same divisions as previously and was in the Army's center. All three were in first echelon, but only the 171st and 150th were on the attack sector. At this time the rifle divisions' strengths varied between 5,000 and 6,000 men each. The divisions in first echelon had the immediate goal of penetrating the defense to a depth of 4.5–5 km, which would carry them through the first two German positions. The Army had the 9th Tank Corps, with 333 tanks, in direct support, in addition to 136 tanks and self-propelled guns of its own. 122 of these were deployed on the breakthrough sector. In order to hide the Army's deployment into the bridgehead the reconnaissance on April 14 was carried out by three divisions of 5th Shock.

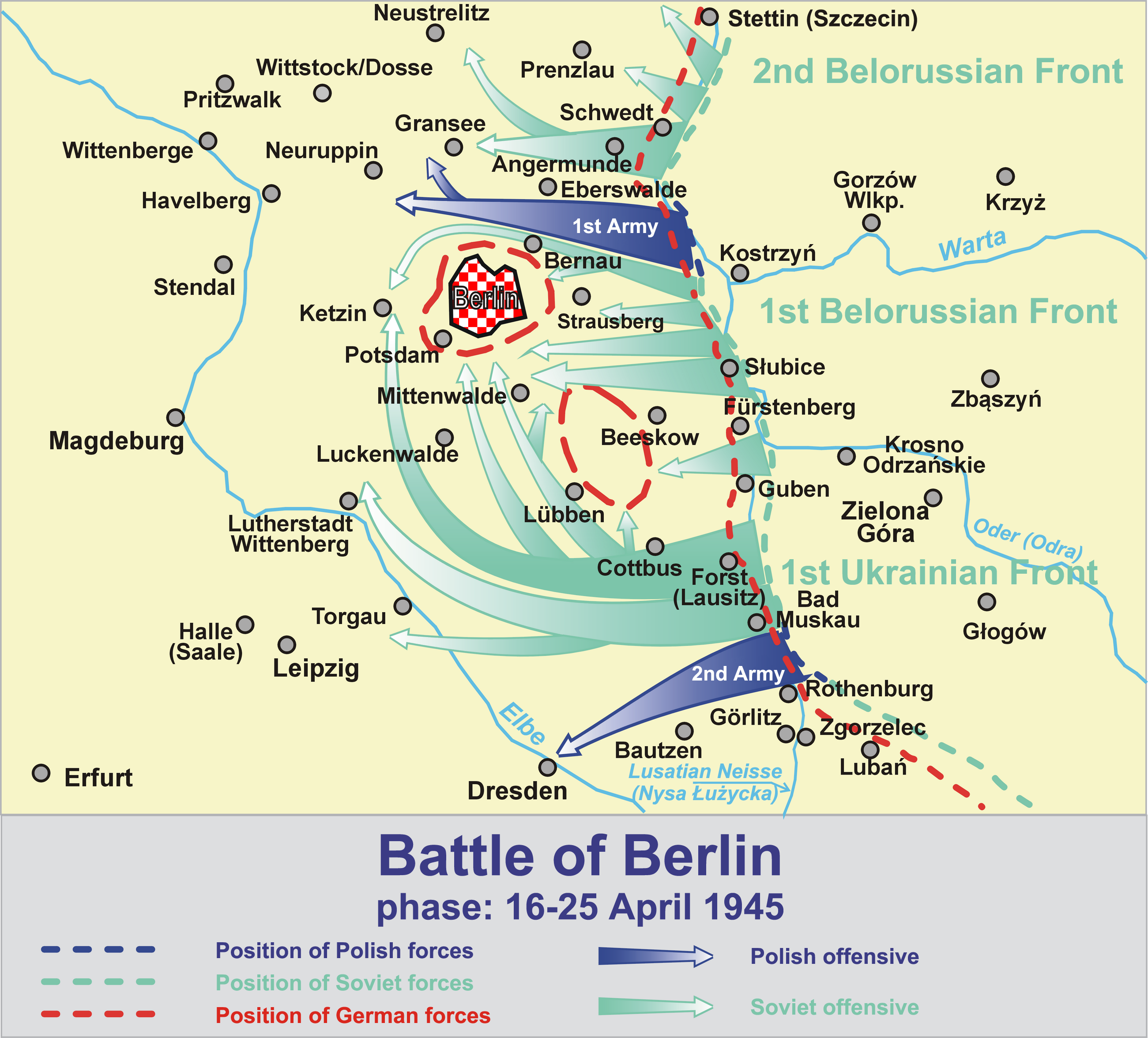
Battle of Berlin. Note location of the Küstrin (Kostrzyn) bridgehead.

Kuznetsov began his reconnaissance on April 15, with the three divisions of 79th Corps contributing two battalions, with fire support from two heavy artillery and one mortar brigade. By day's end the two battalions had consolidated on a line from marker 14.0 to the coach inn 2 km south of Ortwig to marker 8.6, for a total advance of 500m. When the main offensive began the next day 3rd Shock attacked at 0520 hours, following a 20-minute artillery preparation. In an innovation introduced by Zhukov, the attacking infantry and supporting tanks were "assisted" by 20 searchlights to illuminate the defenses, although the results across the Front were mixed. 79th Corps eliminated German fire resistance while driving off five counterattacks of up to battalion strength backed by 4-8 tanks or self-propelled guns. In order to increase the pace of the attack the 9th Tanks was committed on the Corps' sector at 1000. The strongpoints of Ortwig and Gross Barnim were taken and by the end of the day the Corps had reached the canal 1000m east of Neutrebbin after an advance of 8 km. One of the three divisions was now withdrawn into second echelon.

Zhukov ordered the offensive be continued through the night with the intention of breaking through the second zone of defense. This was to be preceded by a 30-40 minute artillery preparation. As morning broke on April 17 German resistance remained stubborn. 3rd Shock resumed attacking at 0800 hours, facing the remnants of the 309th Infantry Division, the 25th Panzergrenadier Division, and part of the 1st Luftwaffe Field Division in the Kunersdorf area. 79th Corps was back in its single echelon formation and, with the help of 9th Tanks' motorized infantry, broke the resistance of the intermediate position, forced the Friedlanderstrom Canal, and advanced 5 km, reaching the outskirts of Kunersdorf–Metzdorf in the second defense zone. Overnight, under prodding from Stalin, Zhukov again demanded that the pace of the offensive be increased.

On April 18, now with the support of both 9th Tanks and part of the 1st Mechanized Corps, 3rd Shock resumed the offensive at 0900 hours. 79th Corps, backed by a brigade of 9th Tanks and two brigades of 9th Guards Tank Corps, captured another 5–6 km, with 150th Division taking the powerful strongpoint at Kunersdorf, which completed the breakthrough of the second zone and also the intermediate position between the second and third zones. The 171st was operating to the south of the 150th. 9th Guards Tanks, of 2nd Guards Tank Army, was subordinated to Kuznetsov at 2100, with the intention of introducing it into the breach that had been created. In order to complete the encirclement of Berlin as quickly as possible the axes of the Front's right wing armies (3rd Shock, 5th Shock, 47th) were altered from northwest and west to west and southwest, and they were also directed to attack day and night. 79th Corps, still with 9th Tanks and part of 1st Mechanized, on April 19 overcame heavy fire resistance, a large number of forest obstructions and minefields, and covered 12 km, breaking through the third defense zone.

=== Breaking into Berlin ===
The formations of 2nd Guards Tanks moved over to support 47th Army on April 20, in an effort to complete the encirclement of Berlin. 3rd Shock continued to fight through the night of April 19/20, particularly in the wooded area near Prötzel. By the end of the day the 79th Corps and 12th Guards Rifle Corps had reached from the eastern edge of the woods 2 km north of Lume to the eastern edge of Lume and Seefeld, an advance of 18 km. 9th Tank Corps had passed through the infantry and was fighting 4 km farther on. The city's outer defensive line had been penetrated on the march and the large strongpoint at Werneuhoe had been taken. At 1350 hours the long-range artillery of 79th Corps, deployed west of Werneuhoe, fired the first two salvoes onto Berlin proper, and at 2230 carried out a bombardment against the area of the Reichstag. The next day Zhukov ordered 3rd Shock and 2nd Guards Tanks to break into the northeastern outskirts of the city to prevent a defense from being established on the inner defense line. Kuznetsov's troops, again backed by 1st Mechanized and again attacking through the night, threw back scattered groups of 1st Luftwaffe, 11th SS Nordland Division, the 309th Infantry, and various elements of the Volkssturm. At 0600 on April 21, forward elements of the 171st were the first Soviet troops to break into the city's northeastern outskirts. The remainder of 79th Corps cut the ring road and captured Karow. At day's end the line Buchholz–Blankenburg–Malchow had been reached in steady fighting.

3rd Shock, still with 1st Mechanized, resumed its assault at 0900 hours on April 22 and spent the day in heavy fighting in northeastern Berlin. The German command was throwing in an odd assortment of forces, including platoons of panzerfaust carriers and antiaircraft guns in the antitank role. In the face of this resistance 79th Corps gained 6 km and reached a line from Rosenthal to Pankow. As an example of the character of this fighting, the advance of the 1st Battalion of the 525th Rifle Regiment has been recorded. By this time the battalion's companies had 35-40 men on strength of which 25-30 were actual riflemen (although mostly armed with submachine guns), and the companies had only two platoons each. In addition, the battalion had eight light machine guns, two heavy machine guns, six antitank rifles, three 82mm mortars, and a pair of 45mm antitank guns. There was also supporting fire from the 357th Artillery Regiment. It was to attack through Pankow and Schoenholtz to reach the junction of Felseneggstrasse and the railroad by the end of the day, in conjunction with the rest of the 525th. The 2nd Battalion was on the right, and to the left the 66th Guards Rifle Regiment of 23rd Guards Rifle Division.

The battalion commander made the decision to attack on a broad front in small groups which would infiltrate through vacant lots and gardens, bypassing as much as possible the defended buildings, which mostly were of two storey construction. An artillery preparation against the known German-held buildings began at 0850 hours and the battalion, deployed in a single echelon, began its attack. In the event there were few German troops in the first buildings as most had fallen back during the bombardment. Groups of 3-4 riflemen then began to filter through the gardens, accompanied by the 45mm guns which fired on buildings at the direction of the company commanders. This was usually sufficient to suppress the defenders, break in, and kill or capture them, before continuing. In the first 10 minutes 700m-800m were covered, 20 prisoners were taken, and the Panke River was reached, at which point the battalion commander paused to regroup. 15 of his men were missing, but most were straggling or disoriented by the fighting.

The commander of the 525th now reinforced the battalion with a battery of 76mm regimental guns and an additional 6 45mm guns. The battalion forced the Panke and attacked along the north bank, clearing further buildings, then turned south and recrossed the river. It now attacked to the west, bypassing the residential areas by moving through the Schlosspark, which was defended by volkssturm from trenches and foxholes. This proceeded rapidly, in part due to the artillery support. By 1000 hours the park was taken, and the battalion was several hundred metres from the junction of Kaiserin-Augusta-Straße and Grabbeallee. The battalion commander now carried out a 30-minute reconnaissance and determined that a group of buildings near the junction, which had been turned into a strongpoint and blocked the road to Schoenholtz, would have to be taken. Two companies would outflank it from the north and south. One company would be supported by eight guns and the other by four.

At noon a 10-minute artillery bombardment by part of 357th Regiment began, and under this cover the flanking maneuvers began. The companies linked up 200m west of the buildings and then turned east, apart from a covering force, and began to storm the strongpoint. The battle lasted 30 minutes and in the end 80 German soldiers were killed and 30 taken prisoner. The battalion continued its advance to the west and took Schoenholtz by 1400; in the day's fighting it lost 14 men killed or wounded. During the day Kuznetsov committed the 7th Rifle Corps from second echelon.

9th Tank Corps returned to its role in support of 3rd Shock on April 23, in addition to 1st Mechanized and 12th Guards Tanks. In intense fighting the Army and its supporting forces cleared a number of city blocks and reached the Lichtenberg–Wittenau railroad. The following day the Army was directed to continue its attack in the northwestern part of the city, with the objective of reaching the Spree River on a sector from Siemensstadt to Lichtenberg station, facing tough resistance from defenders in Berlin's 7th, 8th, and 1st Sectors. An advance of 8 km was obtained, which effectively cleared the northwestern part of the city, and on its right flank reached the Berlin–Spandauer Schifffarts Canal, seizing bridgeheads on the south bank with the 207th Division. At noon on April 25 the encirclement of the city was completed when 47th Army linked up with 1st Ukrainian Front's 4th Guards Tank Army. Throughout the day 3rd Shock was effectively stalled in intense fighting, with several blocks being taken in the eastern part of Siemensstadt.

=== Battle for the Reichstag ===
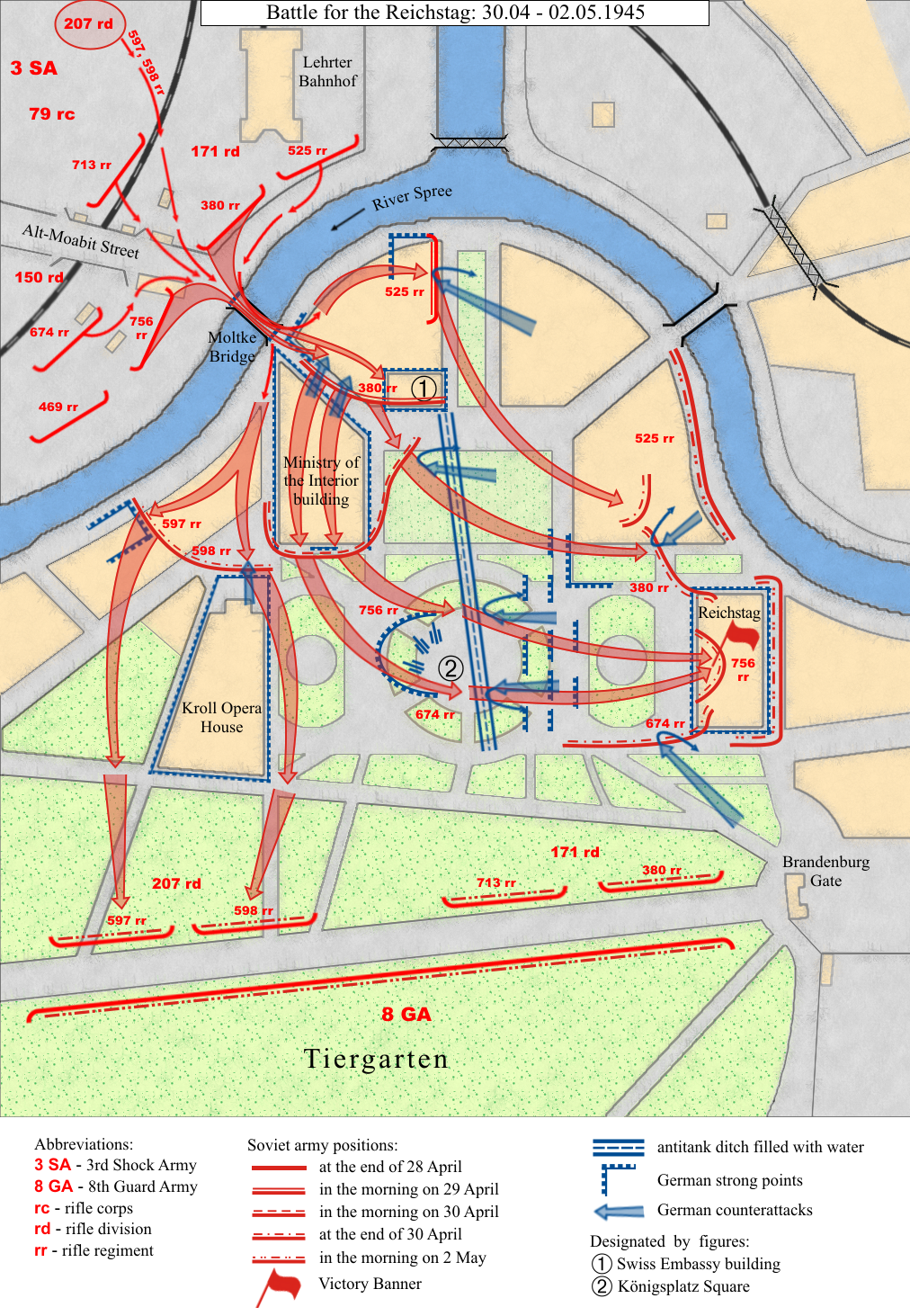
Battle for the Reichstag. Note positions of 380th, 525th and 713th Regiments.

In the central part of Berlin every building had been set up for defense, even those largely destroyed by Allied bombing. Many of these were linked by underground passages. During April 26, 79th Corps, with one brigade of 9th Tanks, attacked from the Plötzensee area to the south and advanced 1,000m-1,300m; its right flank unit took Jungfernheide station after a penetration of 500m into the urban defense line, while the right flank reached the north bank of the Verbindungs Canal. The next day 3rd Shock continued to push southeast in the general direction of the Tiergarten, reaching out to make contact with 8th Guards Army. In the morning 79th Corps, following a powerful artillery preparation and in cooperation with 12th Guards Tanks, completed breaking through the urban line from Jungfernheide to Verbindungs Canal, then cleared the bend between the Spree and the canal. Turning east, it forced the canal from the march and captured the western half of Moabit in stubborn fighting, reaching the north bank of the Spree from Tauroggener Strasse to Krefelder Strasse, and as far as Putlitzstrasse station. Five batteries of 152mm howitzers of the 86th Heavy Howitzer Brigade had been ferried across the canal and these provided direct fire support for the advance through Moabit. By the end of the day some 2.5 km separated the two Armies.

The main objective for April 28 was to split up the trapped German groups of forces in the city center in preparation for their liquidation. General Kuznetsov carried out a regrouping of the 12th Guards Rifle Corps to facilitate the linkup with 8th Guards, while 79th Corps completed the clearing of Moabit and again reached the north bank of the Spree, now north of the city center. Some 7,000 Allied PoWs were freed from Moabit prison. 8th Guards continued to attack northwest toward the Reichstag in order to join hands with 3rd Shock and reduced the gap to some 1,200m. In order to further push 3rd Shock's drive on the Reichstag, at 2300 hours the 38th Rifle Corps was temporarily subordinated to Kuznetsov from Front reserve. On April 29 the battle for this objective began in earnest. The Reichstag is on the south bank of the Spree, at the northeastern corner of the Tiergarten, and was covered by several stone buildings in the Königsplatz area, most notably the massive Ministry of Internal Affairs building, commonly known as "Himmler's House". The Brandenburg Gate is located south of the Reichstag's southeast corner. Only one bridge across the Spree remained standing, the Moltkebrücke, which linked to Alt-Moabit Strasse. This was protected by two powerful barricades, one at each end, which were covered by machine gun fire from all three stories of Himmler's House. A battalion of heavy artillery located in Königsplatz kept the north bank of the Spree under fire. The Reichstag had been set up for all-round defense, with outlying concrete pillboxes. A flooded antitank ditch crossed the Königsplatz, and the building was defended by a garrison of some 1,000 officers and men from a wide variety of units.

79th Corps was tasked with capturing the Reichstag and surrounding area. The Corps commander, Maj. Gen. S. N. Perevertkin, decided to lead with the 171st, which was to seize the Moltkebrücke overnight on April 29/30 and at the same time force a crossing of the Spree northeast of the bridge. On the morning of the 29th elements of the division were directed that they were to clear the corner building on the Kronprinzenufer, following which they were to take Himmler's House in cooperation with 150th Division. 207th Division, in second echelon, was then to capture the Kroll Opera House and then continue to the south to link up with 8th Guards Army in the Tiergarten. By midnight all preparations had been made. Each rifle battalion had two groups, reinforced with self-propelled guns. Heavy artillery had been brought up and prepared for firing over open sights. Batteries of Guards mortars had taken up positions to fire barrages into the Königsplatz and the Reichstag itself.

At 0300 hours the lead elements of 380th Regiment, covered by artillery and machine gun fire, overcame the defenders of both barricades on the Moltkebrücke and reached the south bank of the Spree, then took up positions to defend their gains. At the same time, assault groups of 525th Regiment crossed the Spree northeast of the bridge using improvised means. While both regiments now had men and some equipment on the south bank, they needed a defensible position to consolidate their bridgehead. This entailed an attack on the corner building, which was cleared by 0430. The next objective was Himmler's House, defended by two companies of a composite SS detachment. The lower levels had walls up to 2m thick, reinforced by earthen embankments, and all doors and windows were barricaded and embrasured. At 0700 a powerful 10-minute artillery/mortar bombardment was delivered to both this building, the Kroll Opera, and the adjacent areas, which suppressed many firing points; Guards mortar fire did particular damage to Himmler's House. The launcher crews had carried their rockets and firing equipment to the second floor of the corner building and fired over open sights.

The 150th's 756th Rifle Regiment crossed the Moltkebrücke under cover of the barrage and entered Himmler's House, seizing a corner of it, plus part of the courtyard, by 1300 hours. By now, the 380th Regiment had attacked the northeastern part and taken several rooms on the first floor. The fighting for the building, involving these two regiments, plus the 674th of 150th Division, continued through the rest of the day and into the night, until it was completely cleared by 0400 on April 30. Through this same period the 525th Regiment was involved in heavy fighting clearing the blocks next to Himmler's House from the northeast, and reached Alsenstrasse by 0400. Meanwhile, the Army's other two Corps made only insignificant advances.

As dawn arrived the 79th Corps continued its advance. The Kroll Opera House complicated the approach to the Reichstag. As with the other major buildings it had been set up for all-round defense. Fire from the second floor and roof could be directed on Himmler's House, and ground-level fire could sweep the Königsplatz. The defenders could also interdict the Moltkebrücke and the quays on each side of it, which increased the difficulty of crossing armored vehicles and artillery. Perevertkin had already assigned the 207th Division to this objective, and it was now to cross the Spree and clear it as the 171st and 150th left their jumping-off positions to storm the Reichstag. A concentrated artillery/mortar strike against both buildings from north of the Spree opened up at 0500 hours, accompanied by direct fire from Himmler's House and the corner building. Under cover of this fire the 150th's 756th and 674th Regiments, plus the 380th, raced across the Königsplatz to the flooded antitank ditch. All the footbridges over this had been destroyed by artillery fire, and it formed the last barrier before the Reichstag. Two regiments of the 207th, after having crossed the Spree at 0900, became pinned down on the approaches to the Kroll, but still served to draw fire away from the 171st and 150th.

By noon, elements of the two divisions had taken up jumping-off positions for the final advance on the Reichstag. At about the same time something more than a company of German infantry, with support of machine gun fire and light antiaircraft guns mounted on the building, counterattacked the 525th Regiment in its positions in the block between the Kronprinzenufer and Alsenstrasse. This was thrown back, largely through timely artillery fire. The German grouping now redirected its attack, striking the flank of the 380th's 2nd Battalion with the assistance of a pair of tanks. This regiment was on its start line for the Reichstag attack east of Himmler's House and the space between it and the 525th was not covered by fire. Taking advantage of this the German infantry began firing on the flank and rear of the battalion with submachine gun fire and had to be driven off in hand-to-hand fighting.

==== The final assault ====
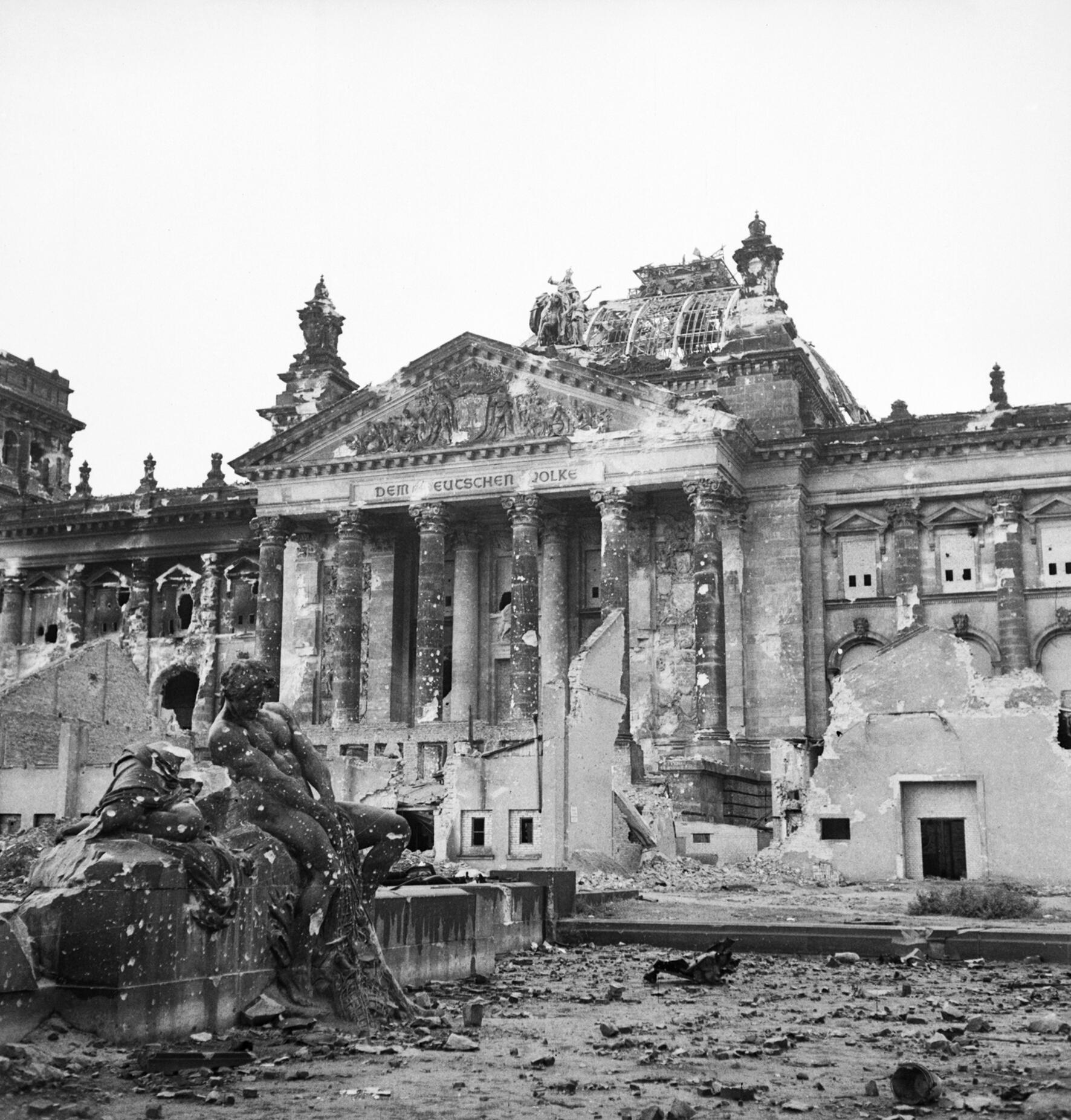
The Reichstag in ruins, June 1945

The artillery preparation for the storming of the Reichstag began at 1330 hours. A total of 89 guns that had crossed to the south bank of the Spree, including tanks, self-propelled guns, Guards mortars, and 152mm and 203mm howitzers, opened direct fire on the structure. In addition, the artillery left on the north bank commenced firing, and the closest riflemen made use of captured panzerfausts. This bombardment lasted 20 minutes. At 1350 the 1st battalions of the 380th (Sen. Lt. Konstantin Yakovlevich Samsonov), 756th, and 674th Regiments, broke into the Reichstag through holes in the walls that led to the circular vestibule. This area was enfiladed by automatic weapons fire, and the attackers took cover behind statues and columns. With their own automatic fire and hand grenades they managed to weaken the defensive fire and seized the rooms next to the vestibule. The three battalions advanced metre by metre, clearing the ground floor. Part of the defenders were pushed into the basement, while the remainder moved to the upper floors.

As this was happening, the 2nd Battalion of the 380th captured the partly-ruined pillboxes to the northwest in a supporting attack. It then faced a counterattack by up to a company of infantry backed by four tanks originating from the bridge on Karlstrasse; this was an effort to reinforce the Reichstag's garrison. The 185th Antitank Battalion went into action, bringing the tanks under fire and disabling or destroying them, which halted the attack. Inside the building a fire broke out, probably due to grenade or panzerfaust fire, and soon gained intensity when flamethrowers were brought in to force the German troops out of the multiple basement rooms. The defenders also fiercely contested the stairways leading to the upper floors. On one of these a pair of scouts of the 1st Battalion of the 756th Regiment, Sgt. M. A. Yegorov and Sgt. M. V. Kantariya, used accurately-thrown grenades to clear a path up half-ruined stairs to reach the dome of the building, where they planted their regimental Victory Banner at 1425 hours. At 2200, Maj. Viktor Dmitrievich Shatalin, commander of the 380th, was ordered to take up positions in trenches southwest of the Reichstag for a subsequent attack which was carried out by 0900 on May 1. The fighting within the structure, particularly the basement, continued into May 2. In all, 79th Corps and its supporting units took more than 2,500 prisoners during the fighting. The commander of 756th Regiment, Col. Zinchenko, was appointed as commandant of the Reichstag.

On the same day the 171st was awarded the battle honor "Berlin", as were its following subunits:

- 380th Rifle Regiment (Major Shatalin)
- 713th Rifle Regiment (Maj. Evsei Pimenovich Zarovnii until April 24, then Lt. Col. Mukhamet Galimovich Mukhtarov)
- 357th Artillery Regiment (Lt. Col. Vladimir Ivanovich Ivanov)
- 185th Antitank Battalion (Cpt. Fyodor Karpovich Marinkevich)
- 137th Sapper Battalion (Maj. Aleksandr Aleksandrovich Zhurid)
- 140th Signal Battalion (Cpt. Inaldiks Elbizdikeevich Salbiev)

The 525th Regiment would be awarded the Order of the Red Banner on June 11 for its role in the battle.

== Postwar ==
At the time of the German surrender the men and women of the division shared the full title of 171st Rifle, Idritsa-Berlin, Order of the Red Banner, Order of Kutuzov Division. (Russian: 171-я стрелковая Идрицко-Берлинская Краснознамённая ордена Кутузова дивизия.) Under the terms of STAVKA Order No. 11095 of May 29 the division, along with the rest of 3rd Shock Army, was allocated to the Group of Soviet Forces in Germany. The Army was headquartered at Stendal. On the same date Colonel Negoda was made a Hero of the Soviet Union. In September he handed the division over to Maj. Gen. Veniamin Yakovlevich Gorbachyov, who had previously led the 75th Guards Rifle Division and would remain in command until May 1946.

On May 31, three more men of the division achieved this highest honor:

- Maj. Sergei Vasilevich Rudnev (commander of 185th Antitank Battalion; seriously wounded before the Reichstag battle)
- Sen. Lt. Mikhail Fyodorovich Tolkachyov (battery commander of 185th Antitank Battalion)
- Lt. Col. Pavel Nikolaevich Shiryaev (divisional chief of artillery)

Before December the 171st was reorganized and redesignated as the 16th Mechanized Division, still under 79th Corps. On May 8, 1946, Lieutenant Samsonov received his Gold Star, as did Lt. Col. Aleksandr Timofeevich Sotnikov, the head of the division's political department, one week later. The 16th Mechanized was disbanded in 1947.
