= Königshof =

Königshof may refer to:

- Königshof, a type of Kaiserpfalz or lesser imperial palace in the Holy Roman Empire used as a temporary stop for the emperor
- Königshof, the German name for a royal court

Historical settlements

- Králův Dvůr, town in the Central Bohemian Region, Czech Republic, formerly known as Königshof
- Remetea Mică, village in the Banat, Romania, formerly known as Königshof

Villages and municipalities

- Königshof (Bliesdorf), former outwork, residential area in the municipality of Bliesdorf, county of Märkisch-Oderland, Brandenburg, Germany
- Bad Königshof, former sanatorium near Hann. Münden
- Königshof (Krefeld), village in the Krefeld quarter of Fischeln, North Rhine-Westphalia, Germany
- Königshof (Nittenau), village in the borough of Nittenau, county of Schwandorf, Bavaria, Germany
- Königshof (Nuremberg), village in the borough of Nuremberg, Bavaria, Germany
- Königshof (Oberharz am Brocken), village in the borough of Oberharz am Brocken, county of Harz, Saxony-Anhalt, Germany
- Königshof (Töpen), village in the municipality of Töpen, county of Hof, Bavaria, Germany
- Königshof (Überlingen), village in the borough of Überlingen, Bodenseekreis, Baden-Württemberg, Germany
- Königshof (Wuppertal), village in Wuppertal, North Rhine-Westphalia, Germany

Königshof is the name of the following structures:

- Königshof (Glückstadt), a building in Glückstadt, Schleswig-Holstein, Germany
- Königshof (Krempe),a building in Krempe (Steinburg), Schleswig-Holstein, Germany
- Königshof Haina, a castle in Haina near Gotha, Thuringia, Germany
- Königshof (Winterthur), a building in Winterthur, Kanton Zürich, Schweiz
- Schloss Königshof, a manor house in Bruckneudorf, Burgenland, Austria

Königshof is the name of the following companies:

- Brauerei Königshof, brewery in Krefeld and its products, North Rhine-Westphalia, Germany
- Hotel Königshof (Bonn), hotel in Bonn, North Rhine-Westphalia, Germany
- Hotel Königshof (Munich), hotel in Munich, Bavaria, Germany

== See also ==
- Königshofen (disambiguation)
