= Harnekop Nuclear Bunker =

Bunker in Brandenburg, Germany

Coordinates: 52°41′39.11″N 13°59′01.04″E

- Atombunker Harnekop
- Prötzel; Near Harnekop in Germany
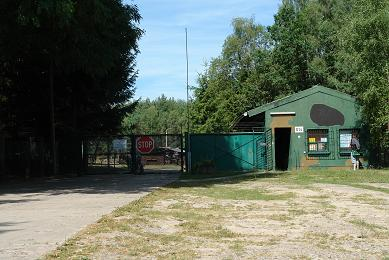
- Entrance to Bunker Harnekop

Site information
- Type: Atomic bomb-proof bunker
- Owner: East German Ministry of National Defence
- Website: Atombunker Harnekop – official site (in German)

Location
- Area: 7,500 square meters

Site history
- Built: 1971

Harnekop Nuclear Bunker (Atombunker Harnekop) is a former atomic bomb-proof bunker in the village of Harnekop in Prötzel, in the district Märkisch-Oderland, Brandenburg, Germany. Built over a 5-year period starting in 1971, the structure was the main bunker for the East German Ministry of National Defence and the National People's Army in case of a nuclear attack on the country.

== Facilities ==
The bunker was built in secret and was camouflaged to look like a flight weather station. It consisted of a three-story deep stainless steel and concrete bunker system that rested on shock absorbers, comprising 7,500 square meters on three levels underground, each 63x40 meters, with 3 meter-thick walls and 7 meter-thick ceilings. It was designed to enable the East German army to operate from there after a nuclear war, with up to 455 men able to survive for up to a month.

The bunker included command and control facilities for operations personnel, meeting rooms, rooms for ministers, a canteen, kitchen, sleeping rooms, medical center. It also featured the systems and technology needed for survival in an isolated bunker surrounded by destruction, including water supplies, electricity generation, air cleaning and circulation system, climate regulation and waste treatment systems.

The building was not detected by NATO Intelligence and was first revealed to the public in 1990, on the day of German reunification.

== Museum ==
The bunker is today protected as a national monument and is open for tours by appointment.
