= Barnim-Oderbruch =

- Amt
- Coat of arms

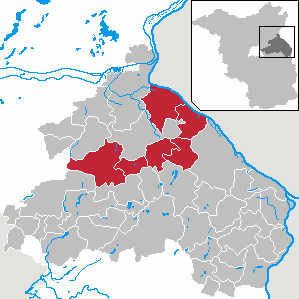
- Map of Märkisch-Oderland highlighting Barnim-Oderbruch
- Interactive map of Barnim-Oderbruch
- Location within Germany Location within Brandenburg
- Coordinates: 52°43′N 14°08′E
- Country: Germany
- State: Brandenburg
- District: Märkisch-Oderland
- Seat: Wriezen
- Subdivisions: 6 municipalities

Area
  - Total: 287.55 km^{2} (111.02 sq mi)

Population (2025-12-31)
  - Total: 6,769
  - Density: 23.54/km^{2} (60.97/sq mi)
- Time zone: UTC+01:00 (CET)
  - Summer (DST): UTC+02:00 (CEST)
- Website: www.barnim-oderbruch.de

Amt Barnim-Oderbruch is an Amt ("collective municipality") in the district of Märkisch-Oderland, in Brandenburg, Germany. Its seat is in Wriezen, itself not part of the Amt.

The Amt Barnim-Oderbruch consists of the following municipalities:

1. Bliesdorf
2. Neulewin
3. Neutrebbin
4. Oderaue
5. Prötzel
6. Reichenow-Möglin

== Demography ==
Development of Population since 1875 within the Current Boundaries (Blue Line: Population; Dotted Line: Comparison to Population Development of Brandenburg state; Grey Background: Time of Nazi rule; Red Background: Time of Communist rule)

Recent Population Development and Projections (Population Development before Census 2011 (blue line); Recent Population Development according to the Census in Germany in 2011 (blue bordered line); Official projections for 2005-2030 (yellow line); for 2017-2030 (scarlet line); for 2020-2030 (green line)

Amt Barnim-Oderbruch: Population development
within the current boundaries (2020)

Year	Pop.	±% p.a.
1875	15,064	—
1890	13,405	−0.77%
1910	12,573	−0.32%
1925	12,644	+0.04%
1939	11,249	−0.83%
1950	14,673	+2.45%
1964	11,089	−1.98%
1971	10,443	−0.85%
1981	8,589	−1.94%

Year	Pop.	±% p.a.
1985	8,158	−1.28%
1990	7,807	−0.88%
1995	7,674	−0.34%
2000	8,016	+0.88%
2005	7,364	−1.68%
2010	6,923	−1.23%
2015	6,705	−0.64%
2020	6,812	+0.32%
2025	6,769	−0.13%
