= Neulewin =

- Municipality
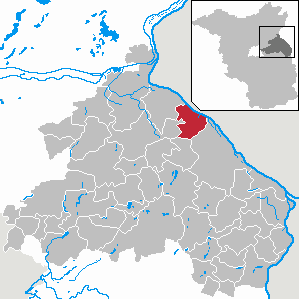
- Location of Neulewin within Märkisch-Oderland district
- Interactive map of Neulewin
- Location within Germany Location within Brandenburg
- Coordinates: 52°44′40″N 14°16′40″E
- Country: Germany
- State: Brandenburg
- District: Märkisch-Oderland
- Municipal assoc.: Barnim-Oderbruch
- Subdivisions: 3 Ortsteile

Government
  - Mayor (2020–25): Kerstin Herrlich

Area
  - Total: 40.76 km^{2} (15.74 sq mi)
- Elevation: 5 m (16 ft)

Population (2025-12-31)
  - Total: 921
  - Density: 22.6/km^{2} (58.5/sq mi)
- Time zone: UTC+01:00 (CET)
  - Summer (DST): UTC+02:00 (CEST)
- Postal codes: 16259
- Dialling codes: 033452
- Vehicle registration: MOL

Neulewin is a municipality in the district Märkisch-Oderland, in Brandenburg, Germany.

== History ==
From 1815 to 1947, Neulewin was part of the Prussian Province of Brandenburg, from 1947 to 1952 of the State of Brandenburg, from 1952 to 1990 of the Bezirk Frankfurt of East Germany and since 1990 again of Brandenburg.

== Demography ==
Development of population since 1875 within the current boundaries (Blue line: Population; Dotted line: Comparison to population development of Brandenburg state; Grey background: Time of Nazi rule; Red background: Time of communist rule)

Neulewin: Population development
within the current boundaries (2013)

Year	Pop.	±% p.a.
1875	3,192	—
1890	2,823	−0.82%
1910	2,470	−0.67%
1925	2,444	−0.07%
1933	2,251	−1.02%
1939	2,085	−1.27%
1946	2,160	+0.51%
1950	2,398	+2.65%
1964	1,936	−1.52%
1971	1,775	−1.23%
1981	1,424	−2.18%
1985	1,360	−1.14%
1989	1,324	−0.67%
1990	1,306	−1.36%
1991	1,265	−3.14%
1992	1,248	−1.34%
1993	1,256	+0.64%
1994	1,261	+0.40%
1995	1,244	−1.35%
1996	1,242	−0.16%

Year	Pop.	±% p.a.
1997	1,218	−1.93%
1998	1,208	−0.82%
1999	1,208	+0.00%
2000	1,195	−1.08%
2001	1,138	−4.77%
2002	1,129	−0.79%
2003	1,104	−2.21%
2004	1,110	+0.54%
2005	1,086	−2.16%
2006	1,053	−3.04%
2007	1,039	−1.33%
2008	1,017	−2.12%
2009	1,000	−1.67%
2010	971	−2.90%
2011	941	−3.09%
2012	927	−1.49%
2013	914	−1.40%
2014	930	+1.75%
2015	921	−0.97%
2016	906	−1.63%
