= Königshofen =

Königshofen may refer to:

- Bad Königshofen (Bad Königshofen im Grabfeld), a town in Bavaria, Germany
- Lauda-Königshofen, a town in the Main-Tauber district in Baden-Württemberg, Germany
