= Neutrebbin =

- Municipality
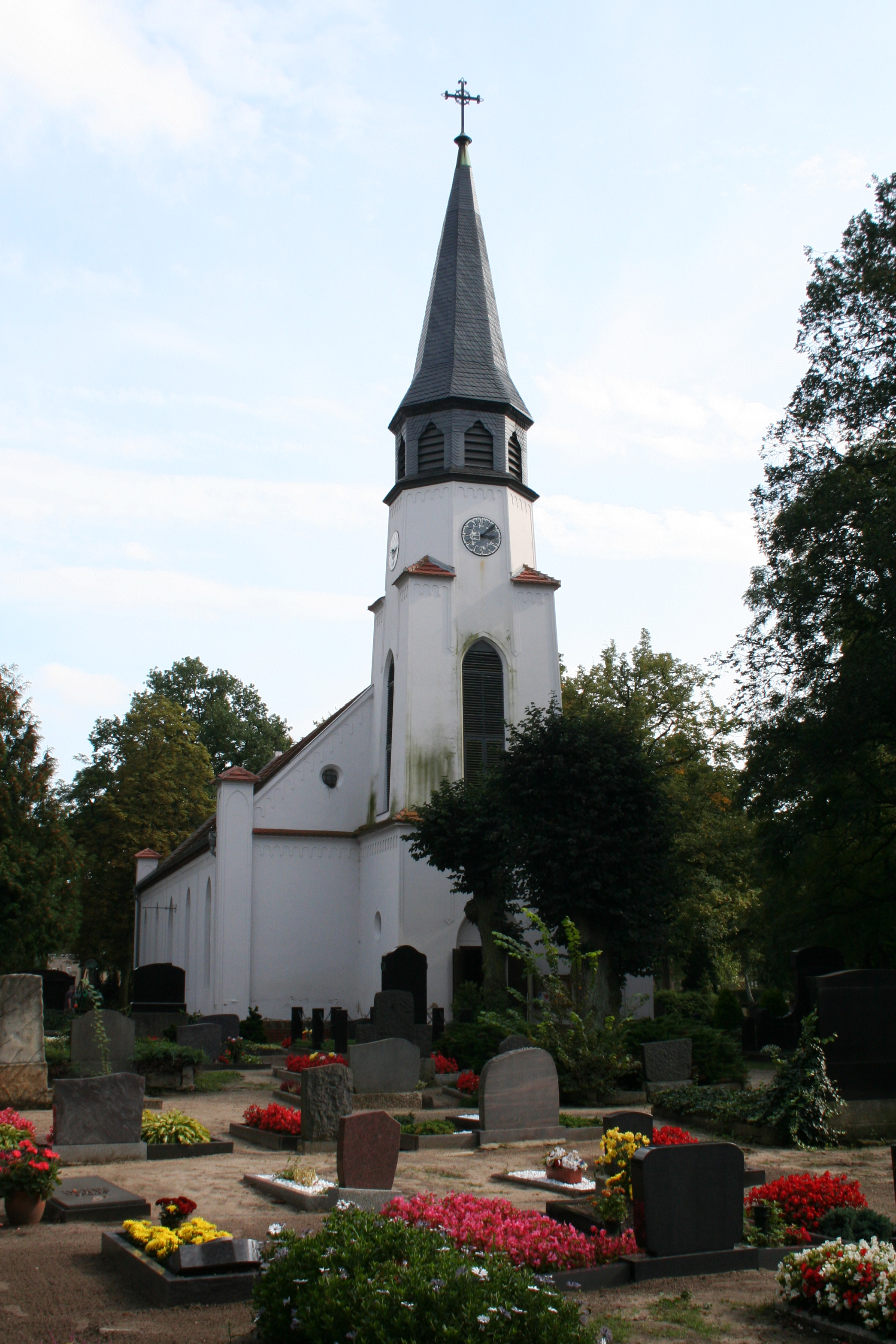
- Church in Neutrebbin

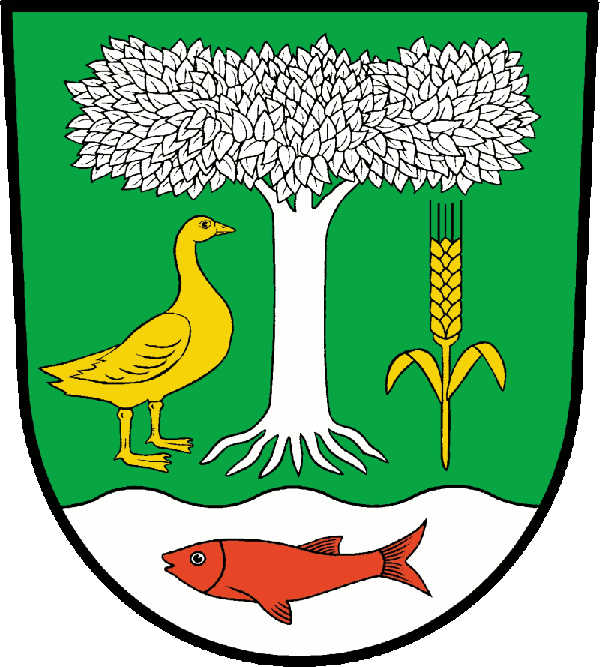
- Coat of arms

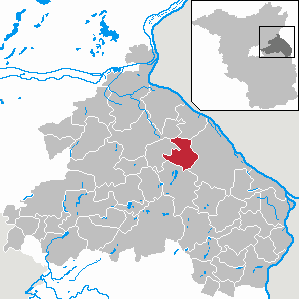
- Location of Neutrebbin within Märkisch-Oderland district
- Interactive map of Neutrebbin
- Location within Germany Location within Brandenburg
- Coordinates: 52°39′48″N 14°13′39″E
- Country: Germany
- State: Brandenburg
- District: Märkisch-Oderland
- Municipal assoc.: Barnim-Oderbruch
- Subdivisions: 3 Ortsteile

Government
  - Mayor (2024–29): Mario Hirschbein

Area
  - Total: 36.63 km^{2} (14.14 sq mi)
- Elevation: 4 m (13 ft)

Population (2025-12-31)
  - Total: 1,338
  - Density: 36.53/km^{2} (94.61/sq mi)
- Time zone: UTC+01:00 (CET)
  - Summer (DST): UTC+02:00 (CEST)
- Postal codes: 15320
- Dialling codes: 033474
- Vehicle registration: MOL
- Website: www.neutrebbin.de

Neutrebbin is a municipality in the district Märkisch-Oderland, in Brandenburg, Germany.

== History ==
From 1815 to 1947, Neutrebbin was part of the Prussian Province of Brandenburg, from 1947 to 1952 of the State of Brandenburg, from 1952 to 1990 of the Bezirk Frankfurt of East Germany and since 1990 again of Brandenburg.

== Demography ==
Development of population since 1875 within the current boundaries (Blue line: Population; Dotted line: Comparison to population development of Brandenburg state; Grey background: Time of Nazi rule; Red background: Time of communist rule)

Neutrebbin: Population development
within the current boundaries (2013)

Year	Pop.	±% p.a.
1875	3,078	—
1890	2,933	−0.32%
1910	3,036	+0.17%
1925	2,963	−0.16%
1933	2,845	−0.51%
1939	2,860	+0.09%
1946	3,678	+3.66%
1950	3,610	−0.47%
1964	2,409	−2.85%
1971	2,274	−0.82%
1981	1,869	−1.94%
1985	1,804	−0.88%
1989	1,770	−0.47%
1990	1,745	−1.41%
1991	1,721	−1.38%
1992	1,682	−2.27%
1993	1,658	−1.43%
1994	1,618	−2.41%
1995	1,612	−0.37%
1996	1,624	+0.74%

Year	Pop.	±% p.a.
1997	1,647	+1.42%
1998	1,663	+0.97%
1999	1,654	−0.54%
2000	1,667	+0.79%
2001	1,673	+0.36%
2002	1,663	−0.60%
2003	1,635	−1.68%
2004	1,628	−0.43%
2005	1,621	−0.43%
2006	1,570	−3.15%
2007	1,546	−1.53%
2008	1,534	−0.78%
2009	1,519	−0.98%
2010	1,504	−0.99%
2011	1,497	−0.47%
2012	1,490	−0.47%
2013	1,483	−0.47%
2014	1,445	−2.56%
2015	1,409	−2.49%
2016	1,389	−1.42%
