= Bliesdorf =

Place in Brandenburg, Germany

- Municipality
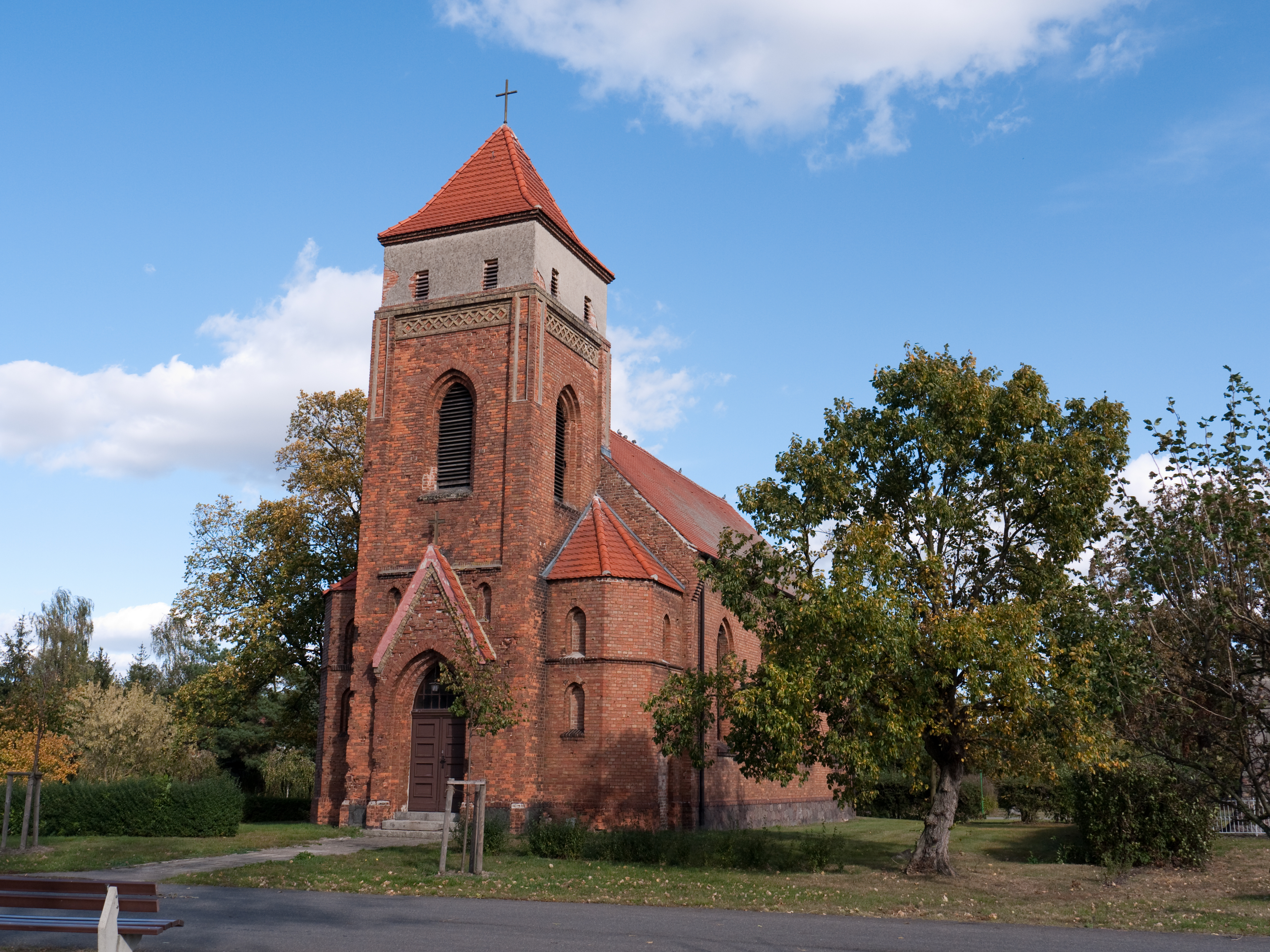
- Church

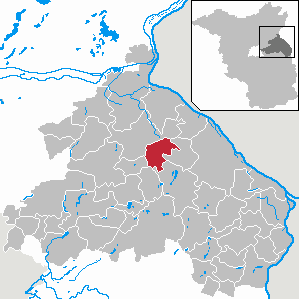
- Location of Bliesdorf within Märkisch-Oderland district
- Interactive map of Bliesdorf
- Location within Germany Location within Brandenburg
- Coordinates: 52°42′N 14°09′E
- Country: Germany
- State: Brandenburg
- District: Märkisch-Oderland
- Municipal assoc.: Barnim-Oderbruch
- Subdivisions: 3 Ortsteile

Government
  - Mayor (2024–29): Reiner Labitzke

Area
  - Total: 34.41 km^{2} (13.29 sq mi)
- Elevation: 7 m (23 ft)

Population (2025-12-31)
  - Total: 1,299
  - Density: 37.75/km^{2} (97.77/sq mi)
- Time zone: UTC+01:00 (CET)
  - Summer (DST): UTC+02:00 (CEST)
- Postal codes: 16269
- Dialling codes: 033456
- Vehicle registration: MOL

Bliesdorf is a municipality in the district Märkisch-Oderland, in Brandenburg, Germany.

== History ==
From 1815 to 1947, Bliesdorf was part of the Prussian Province of Brandenburg, from 1947 to 1952 of the State of Brandenburg, from 1952 to 1990 of the Bezirk Frankfurt of East Germany and since 1990 again of Brandenburg.

== Demography ==
Development of population since 1875 within the current boundaries (Blue line: Population; Dotted line: Comparison to population development of Brandenburg state; Grey background: Time of Nazi rule; Red background: Time of communist rule)

Bliesdorf: Population development
within the current boundaries (2013)

Year	Pop.	±% p.a.
1875	1,648	—
1890	1,459	−0.81%
1910	1,302	−0.57%
1925	1,444	+0.69%
1933	1,283	−1.47%
1939	1,199	−1.12%
1946	1,447	+2.72%
1950	1,581	+2.24%
1964	1,165	−2.16%
1971	1,108	−0.71%
1981	968	−1.34%
1985	917	−1.34%
1989	868	−1.36%
1990	869	+0.12%
1991	926	+6.56%
1992	866	−6.48%
1993	993	+14.67%
1994	1,014	+2.11%
1995	1,046	+3.16%
1996	1,117	+6.79%

Year	Pop.	±% p.a.
1997	1,262	+12.98%
1998	1,296	+2.69%
1999	1,375	+6.10%
2000	1,270	−7.64%
2001	1,291	+1.65%
2002	1,334	+3.33%
2003	1,268	−4.95%
2004	1,208	−4.73%
2005	980	−18.87%
2006	992	+1.22%
2007	999	+0.71%
2008	1,012	+1.30%
2009	995	−1.68%
2010	999	+0.40%
2011	983	−1.60%
2012	964	−1.93%
2013	923	−4.25%
2014	923	+0.00%
2015	1,223	+32.50%
2016	1,146	−6.30%

The conspicuous increases in 1996/97 and 2015 are due to the refugee camp in the village.
