= Prötzel =

- Municipality
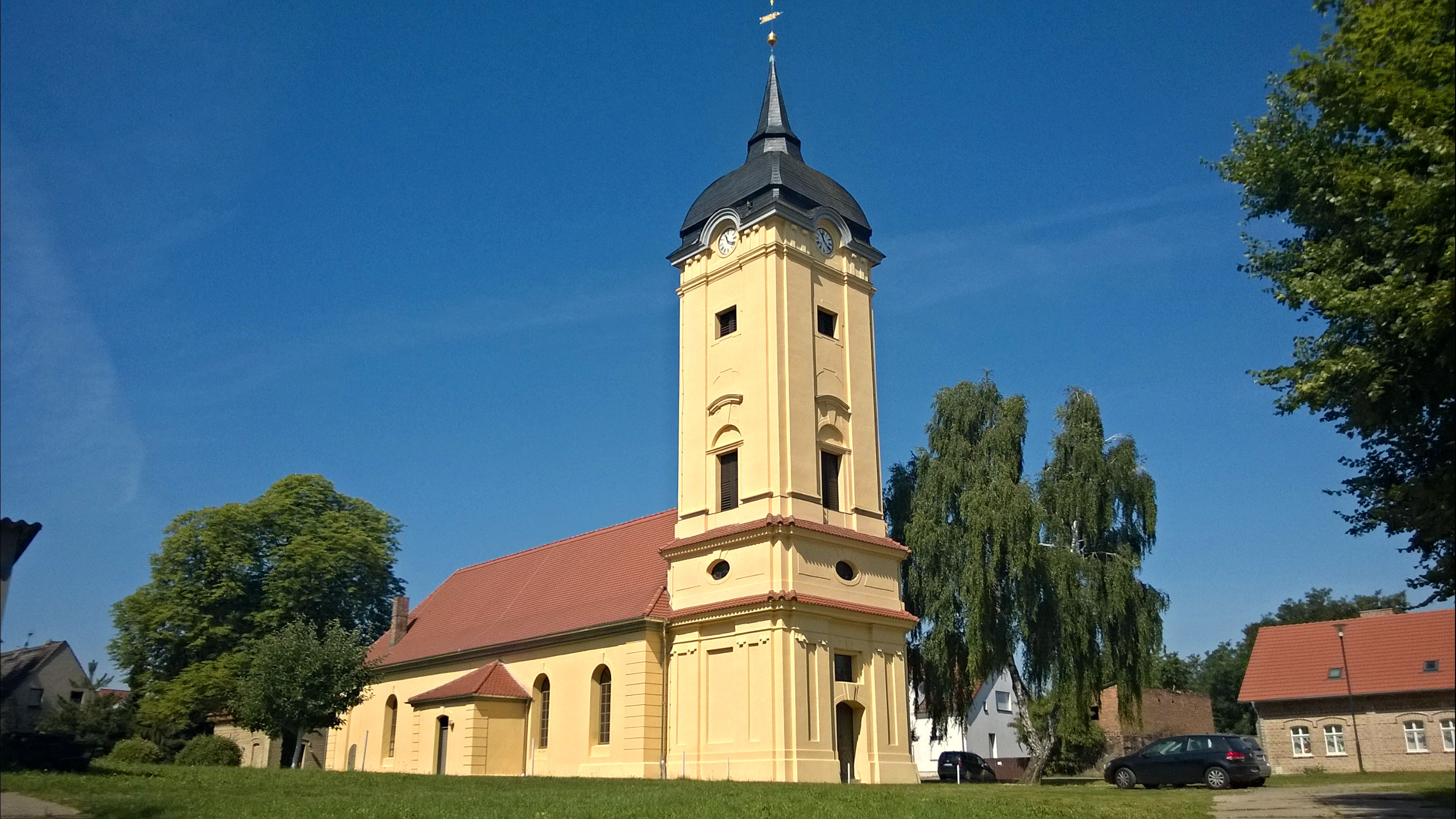
- Church in Prötzel village

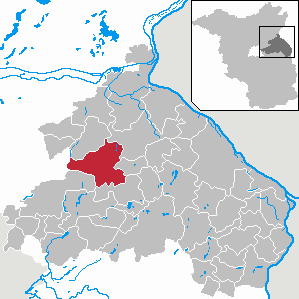
- Location of Prötzel within Märkisch-Oderland district
- Interactive map of Prötzel
- Location within Germany Location within Brandenburg
- Coordinates: 52°38′N 13°59′E
- Country: Germany
- State: Brandenburg
- District: Märkisch-Oderland
- Municipal assoc.: Barnim-Oderbruch
- Subdivisions: 4 Ortsteile

Government
  - Mayor (2024–29): Simona Koß (SPD)

Area
  - Total: 85.53 km^{2} (33.02 sq mi)
- Elevation: 90 m (300 ft)

Population (2025-12-31)
  - Total: 1,095
  - Density: 12.80/km^{2} (33.16/sq mi)
- Time zone: UTC+01:00 (CET)
  - Summer (DST): UTC+02:00 (CEST)
- Postal codes: 15345
- Dialling codes: 033436
- Vehicle registration: MOL

Prötzel is a municipality in the district Märkisch-Oderland, in Brandenburg, Germany.

== History ==
From 1815 to 1947, Prötzel was part of the Prussian Province of Brandenburg, from 1947 to 1952 of the State of Brandenburg, from 1952 to 1990 of the Bezirk Frankfurt of East Germany and since 1990 again of Brandenburg.

== Demography ==
Development of Population since 1875 within the Current Boundaries (Blue Line: Population; Dotted Line: Comparison to Population Development of Brandenburg state; Grey Background: Time of Nazi rule; Red Background: Time of Communist rule)

Prötzel: Population development
within the current boundaries (2013)

Year	Pop.	±% p.a.
1875	1,514	—
1890	1,416	−0.45%
1910	1,448	+0.11%
1925	1,466	+0.08%
1933	1,314	−1.36%
1939	1,303	−0.14%
1946	1,550	+2.51%
1950	1,766	+3.32%
1964	1,587	−0.76%
1971	1,518	−0.63%
1981	1,293	−1.59%
1985	1,237	−1.10%
1989	1,186	−1.05%
1990	1,170	−1.35%
1991	1,134	−3.08%
1992	1,130	−0.35%
1993	1,155	+2.21%
1994	1,221	+5.71%
1995	1,179	−3.44%
1996	1,226	+3.99%

Year	Pop.	±% p.a.
1997	1,259	+2.69%
1998	1,271	+0.95%
1999	1,264	−0.55%
2000	1,259	−0.40%
2001	1,275	+1.27%
2002	1,267	−0.63%
2003	1,234	−2.60%
2004	1,232	−0.16%
2005	1,205	−2.19%
2006	1,196	−0.75%
2007	1,175	−1.76%
2008	1,164	−0.94%
2009	1,143	−1.80%
2010	1,148	+0.44%
2011	1,000	−12.89%
2012	970	−3.00%
2013	963	−0.72%
2014	966	+0.31%
2015	998	+3.31%
2016	1,012	+1.40%
