= Beiersdorf (disambiguation) =

Beiersdorf is a German company.

Beiersdorf may also refer to:

- Beiersdorf (Coburg)
- Beiersdorf, Saxony, municipality
- Beiersdorf-Freudenberg, municipality
- Paul Beiersdorf (1836–1896), pharmacist
- Russell Beiersdorf (born 1965), professional golfer
