= Falkenberg station =

Falkenberg station may refer to the following railway stations:

- Falkenberg (Elster) station, a major station in southern Brandenburg, Germany
- Falkenberg (Mark) station, in eastern Brandenburg, Germany
- Falkenberg railway station (Sweden), on the West Coast Line (Sweden)

== See also ==
- Falkenburg Station, Ontario, a district of Bracebridge, Canada
