= Neutrebbin station =

Railway station in Germany

Neutrebbin
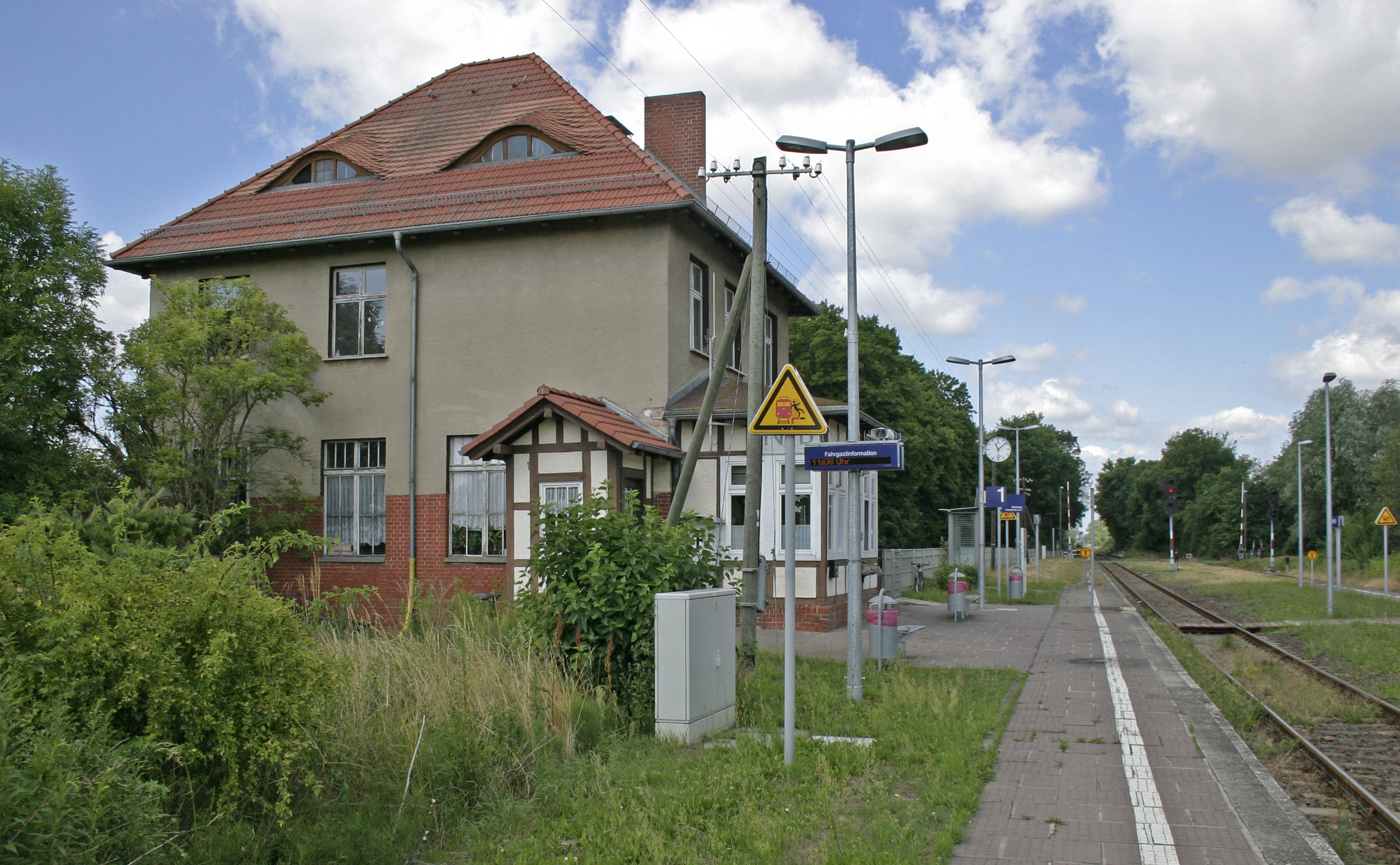
- 2015

General information
- Location: Bahnhofstraße 45; 15320 Neutrebbin; Brandenburg; Germany
- Coordinates: 52.6761°N 14.2369°E
- System: Bf
- Owner: DB Netz
- Operator: DB Station&Service
- Lines: Eberswalde–Frankfurt (Oder) railway (KBS 209.60)
- Platforms: 2 side platforms
- Tracks: 2
- Train operators: Niederbarnimer Eisenbahn

Other information
- Station code: 4462
- DS100 code: BNTB
- IBNR: 8012475
- Category: 6
- Fare zone: VBB: 5168
- Website: www.bahnhof.de

Services
| Preceding station | Niederbarnimer Eisenbahn | Following station |
|---|---|---|
| Wriezen towards Eberswalde Hbf | RB 60 | Letschin towards Frankfurt (Oder) |
Location
- Location within Brandenburg Location within Germany Location within Europe

Neutrebbin station is a railway station in the municipality of Neutrebbin, located in the Märkisch-Oderland district in Brandenburg, Germany.
