= Falkenberg-Höhe =

- Amt
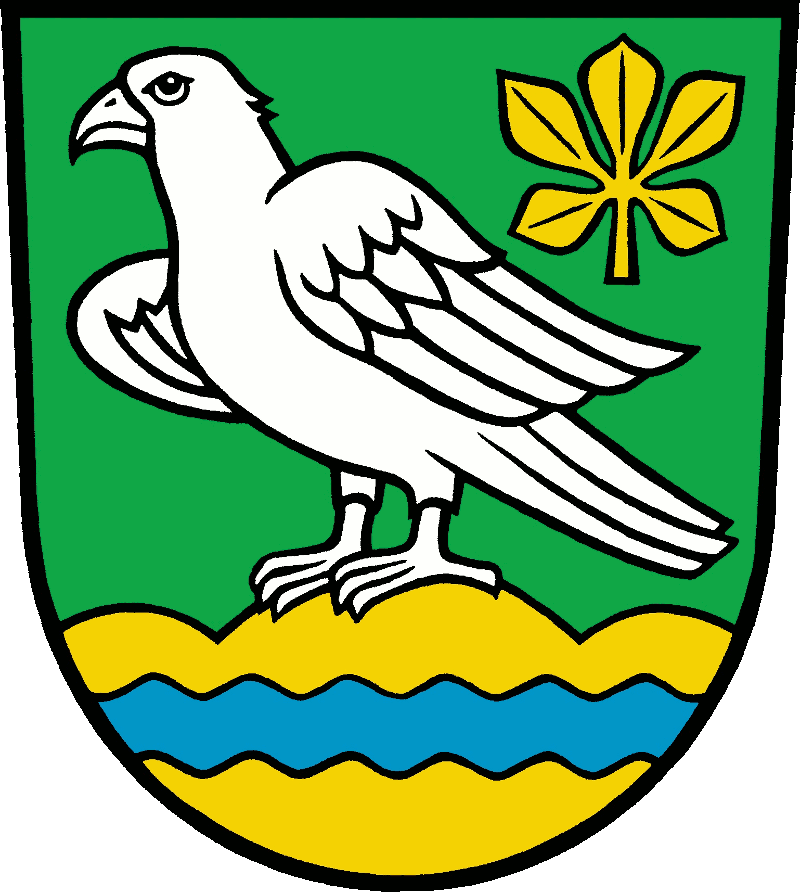
- Coat of arms

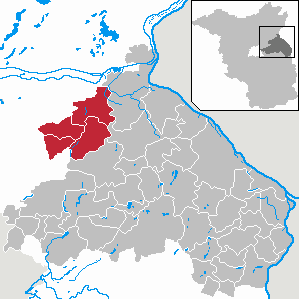
- Map of Märkisch-Oderland highlighting Falkenberg-Höhe
- Interactive map of Falkenberg-Höhe
- Location within Germany Location within Brandenburg
- Coordinates: 52°43′N 14°08′E
- Country: Germany
- State: Brandenburg
- District: Märkisch-Oderland
- Seat: Falkenberg
- Subdivisions: 4 municipalities

Area
  - Total: 174.67 km^{2} (67.44 sq mi)

Population (2025-12-31)
  - Total: 4,587
  - Density: 26.26/km^{2} (68.02/sq mi)
- Time zone: UTC+01:00 (CET)
  - Summer (DST): UTC+02:00 (CEST)
- Website: www.amt-fahoe.de

Amt Falkenberg-Höhe is an Amt ("collective municipality") in the district of Märkisch-Oderland, in Brandenburg, Germany. Its seat is in Falkenberg.

The Amt Falkenberg-Höhe consists of the following municipalities:

1. Beiersdorf-Freudenberg
2. Falkenberg
3. Heckelberg-Brunow
4. Höhenland

== Demography ==
Development of Population since 1875 within the Current Boundaries (Blue Line: Population; Dotted Line: Comparison to Population Development of Brandenburg state; Grey Background: Time of Nazi rule; Red Background: Time of Communist rule)

Recent Population Development and Projections (Population Development before Census 2011 (blue line); Recent Population Development according to the Census in Germany in 2011 (blue bordered line); Official projections for 2005-2030 (yellow line); for 2017-2030 (scarlet line); for 2020-2030 (green line)

Amt Falkenberg-Höhe: Population development
within the current boundaries (2020)

Year	Pop.	±% p.a.
1875	5,991	—
1890	6,145	+0.17%
1910	6,428	+0.23%
1925	6,428	+0.00%
1939	6,499	+0.08%
1950	8,378	+2.34%
1964	7,100	−1.18%
1971	6,958	−0.29%
1981	5,816	−1.78%

Year	Pop.	±% p.a.
1985	5,508	−1.35%
1990	5,178	−1.23%
1995	4,958	−0.86%
2000	5,138	+0.72%
2005	5,067	−0.28%
2010	4,660	−1.66%
2015	4,495	−0.72%
2020	4,635	+0.62%
2025	4,587	−0.21%
