= Letschin station =

Railway station in Germany

Letschin
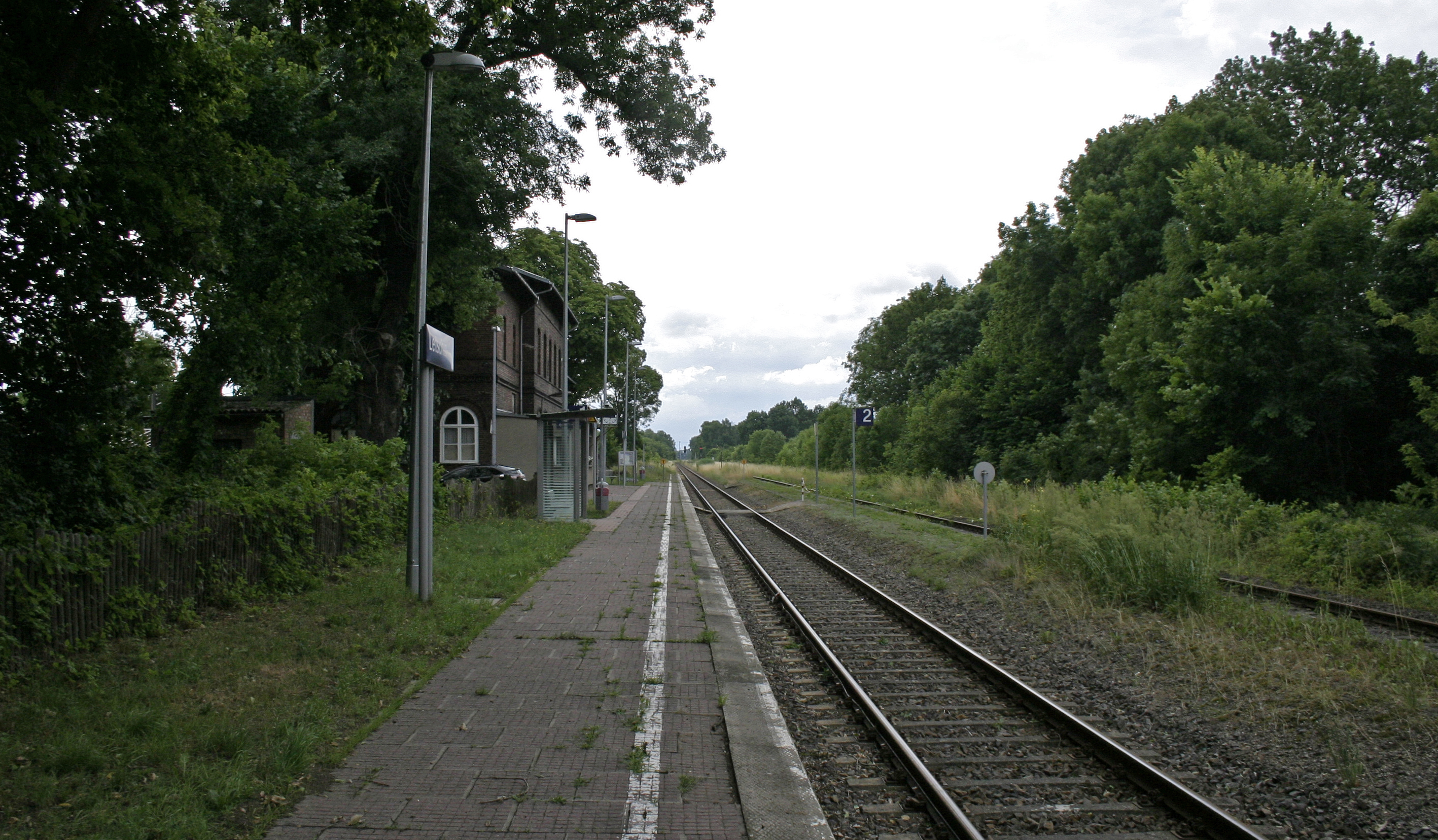
- 2015

General information
- Location: Bahnhofsweg; 15324 Letschin; Brandenburg; Germany
- Coordinates: 52.6327°N 14.3477°E
- Owner: DB Netz
- Operator: DB Station&Service
- Lines: Eberswalde–Frankfurt (Oder) railway (KBS 209.60)
- Platforms: 2 side platforms
- Tracks: 2
- Train operators: Niederbarnimer Eisenbahn

Other information
- Station code: 3672
- DS100 code: BLTS
- IBNR: 8012205
- Category: 6
- Fare zone: VBB: 5271
- Website: www.bahnhof.de

Services
Preceding station	Niederbarnimer Eisenbahn	Following station
Neutrebbin towards Eberswalde Hbf	RB 60	Werbig towards Frankfurt (Oder)
Location
- Location within Brandenburg

Letschin station is a railway station in the municipality of Letschin, located in the Märkisch-Oderland district in Brandenburg, Germany.
