= Falkenberg (Mark) station =

Railway station in Germany

Falkenberg (Mark)
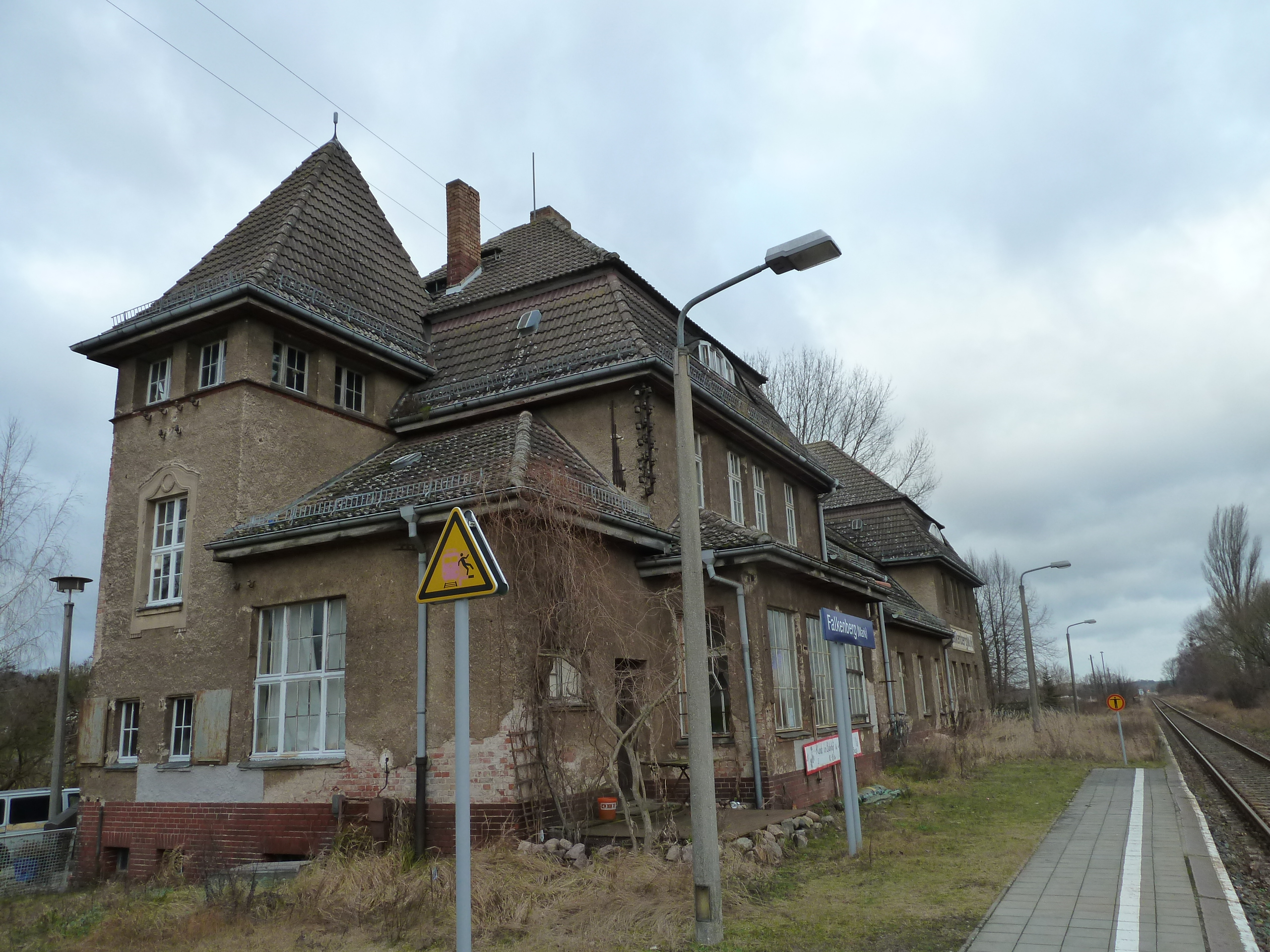
- 2012

General information
- Location: Am Bahnhof 2; 16259 Falkenberg (Mark); Brandenburg; Germany
- Coordinates: 52.8079°N 13.9599°E
- Owner: DB Netz
- Operator: DB Station&Service
- Lines: Eberswalde–Frankfurt (Oder) railway (KBS 209.60)
- Platforms: 1 side platform
- Tracks: 1
- Train operators: Niederbarnimer Eisenbahn

Other information
- Station code: 1754
- DS100 code: WFBG
- IBNR: 8011531
- Category: 6
- Fare zone: VBB: 4864
- Website: www.bahnhof.de

Services
Preceding station	Niederbarnimer Eisenbahn	Following station
Niederfinow towards Eberswalde Hbf	RB 60	Bad Freienwalde (Oder) towards Frankfurt (Oder)
Location
- Location within Brandenburg

Falkenberg (Mark) station is a railway station in the municipality of Falkenberg (Mark), located in the Märkisch-Oderland district in Brandenburg, Germany.
