= Heckelberg-Brunow =

- Municipality
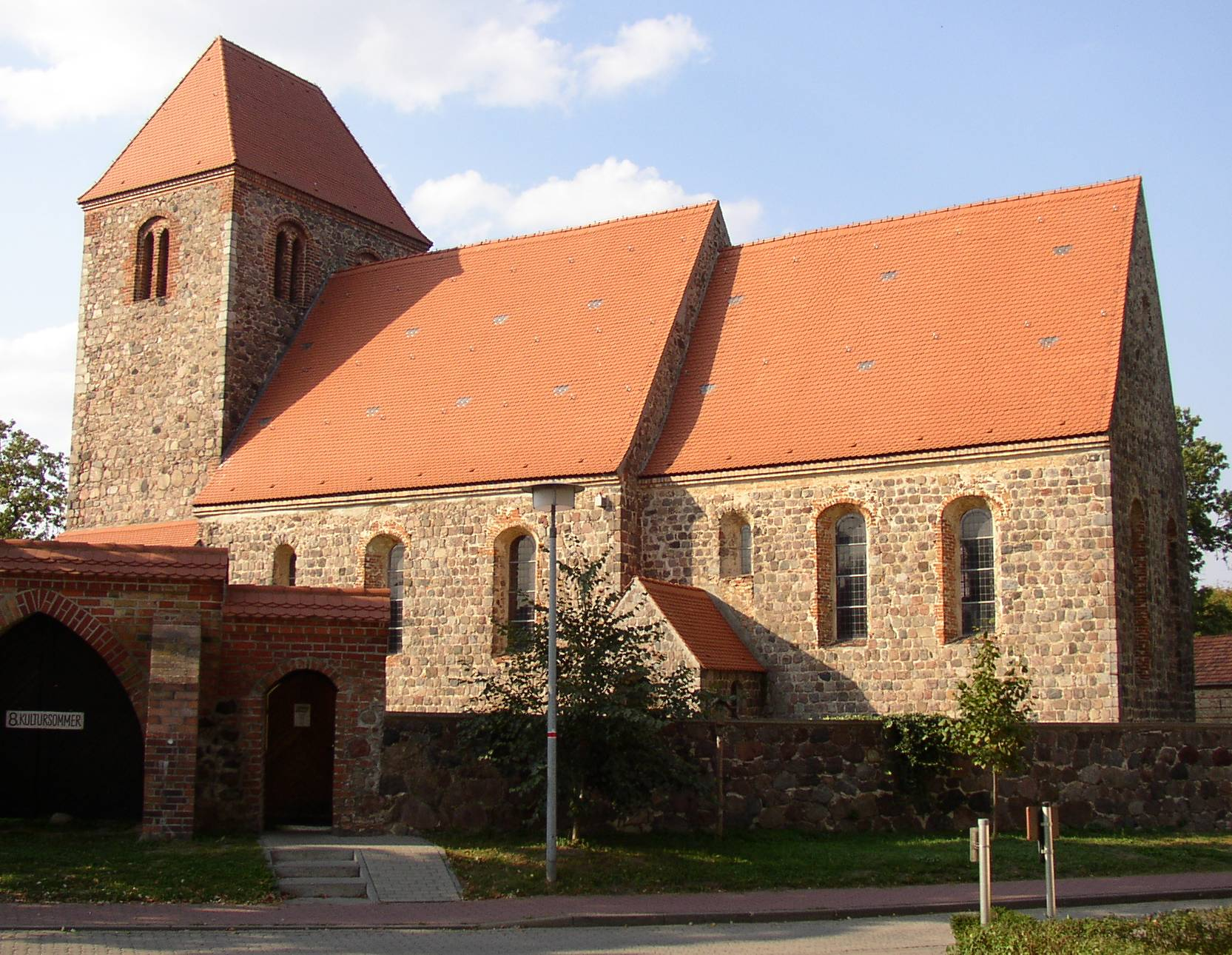
- Church in Heckelberg

- Coat of arms

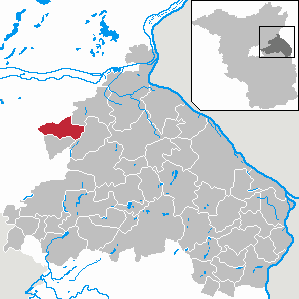
- Location of Heckelberg-Brunow within Märkisch-Oderland district
- Interactive map of Heckelberg-Brunow
- Location within Germany Location within Brandenburg
- Coordinates: 52°44′06″N 13°51′28″E
- Country: Germany
- State: Brandenburg
- District: Märkisch-Oderland
- Municipal assoc.: Falkenberg-Höhe
- Subdivisions: 2 Ortsteile

Government
  - Mayor (2024–29): Mandy Buhe

Area
  - Total: 35.41 km^{2} (13.67 sq mi)
- Elevation: 95 m (312 ft)

Population (2025-12-31)
  - Total: 715
  - Density: 20.2/km^{2} (52.3/sq mi)
- Time zone: UTC+01:00 (CET)
  - Summer (DST): UTC+02:00 (CEST)
- Postal codes: 16259
- Dialling codes: 033451
- Vehicle registration: MOL

Heckelberg-Brunow is a municipality in the district Märkisch-Oderland, in Brandenburg, Germany.

== History ==
On 31 December 2001, the municipality of Heckelberg-Brunow was formed by merging the municipalities of Heckelberg and Brunow.

From 1815 to 1947, Heckelberg and Brunow were part of the Prussian Province of Brandenburg, from 1947 to 1952 of the State of Brandenburg, from 1952 to 1990 of the Bezirk Frankfurt of East Germany and since 1990 again of Brandenburg, since 2001 united as Heckelberg-Brunow.

== Demography ==
Development of Population since 1875 within the Current Boundaries (Blue Line: Population; Dotted Line: Comparison to Population Development of Brandenburg state; Grey Background: Time of Nazi rule; Red Background: Time of Communist rule)

Heckelberg-Brunow: Population development
within the current boundaries (2017)

Year	Pop.	±% p.a.
1875	863	—
1890	903	+0.30%
1910	932	+0.16%
1925	905	−0.20%
1933	919	+0.19%
1939	943	+0.43%
1946	1,112	+2.38%
1950	1,310	+4.18%
1964	1,041	−1.63%
1971	1,013	−0.39%
1981	945	−0.69%
1985	885	−1.63%
1989	849	−1.03%
1990	829	−2.36%

Year	Pop.	±% p.a.
1991	817	−1.45%
1992	803	−1.71%
1993	813	+1.25%
1994	805	−0.98%
1995	819	+1.74%
1996	797	−2.69%
1997	826	+3.64%
1998	849	+2.78%
1999	873	+2.83%
2000	916	+4.93%
2001	888	−3.06%
2002	871	−1.91%
2003	839	−3.67%
2004	853	+1.67%

Year	Pop.	±% p.a.
2005	863	+1.17%
2006	852	−1.27%
2007	821	−3.64%
2008	795	−3.17%
2009	765	−3.77%
2010	749	−2.09%
2011	697	−6.94%
2012	699	+0.29%
2013	694	−0.72%
2014	681	−1.87%
2015	668	−1.91%
2016	665	−0.45%
2017	659	−0.90%
