= Altranft station =

Railway station in Altranft, Germany

Altranft
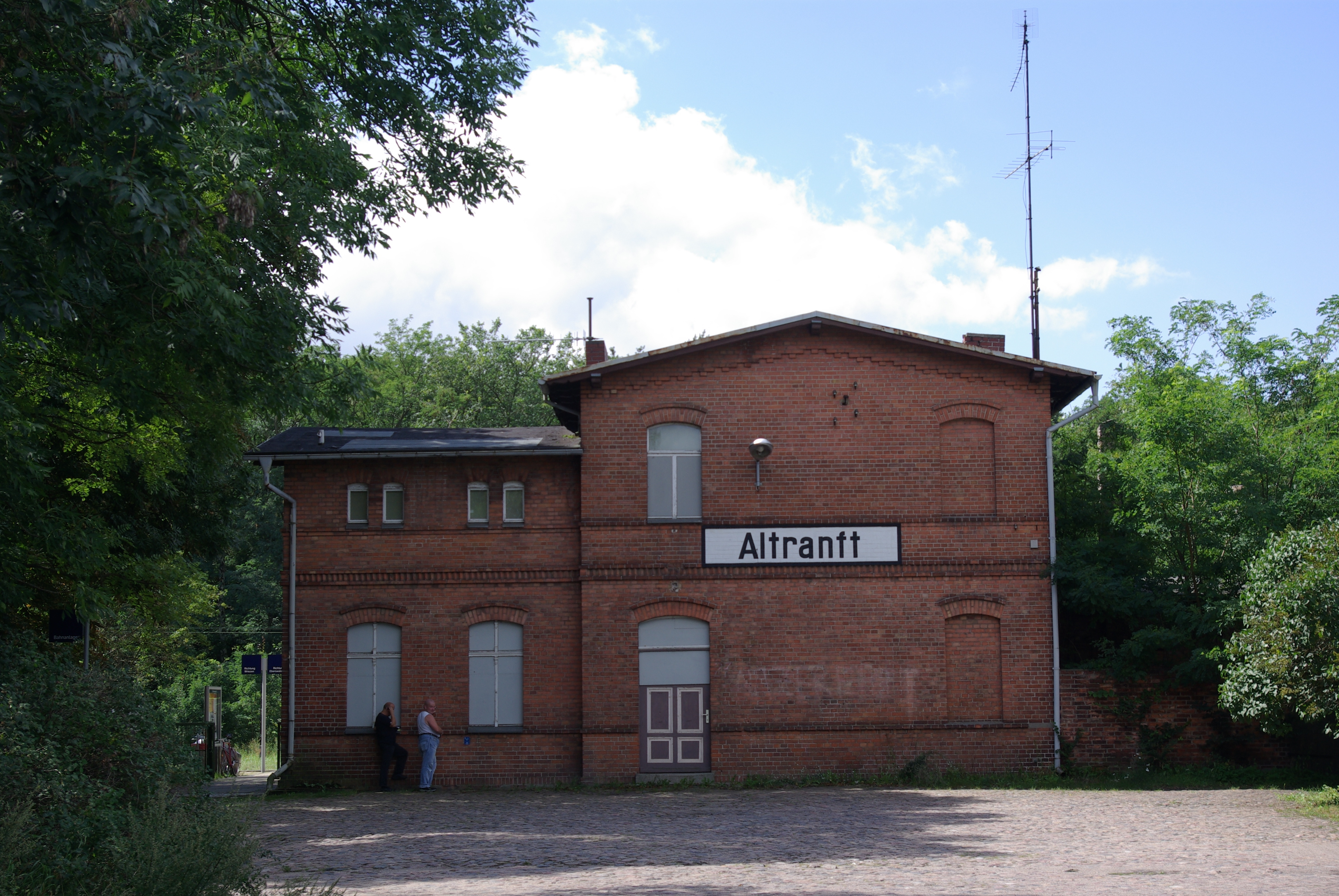
- 2011

General information
- Location: Alte Heerstraße 27; 16259 Bad Freienwalde (Oder); Brandenburg; Germany
- Coordinates: 52°45′49″N 14°04′57″E
- Owner: DB Netz
- Operator: DB Station&Service
- Lines: Eberswalde–Frankfurt (Oder) railway (KBS 209.60)
- Platforms: 1 side platform
- Tracks: 1
- Train operators: Niederbarnimer Eisenbahn

Other information
- Station code: 128
- DS100 code: BART
- IBNR: 8011034
- Category: 6
- Fare zone: : 4966
- Website: www.bahnhof.de

History
- Opened: 20 July 1880; 146 years ago

Services
Preceding station	Niederbarnimer Eisenbahn	Following station
Bad Freienwalde (Oder) towards Eberswalde Hbf	RB 60	Wriezen towards Frankfurt (Oder)
Location
- Location within Brandenburg

Altranft station is a railway station in the Altranft district of the spa town of Bad Freienwalde (Oder), located in the Märkisch-Oderland district in Brandenburg, Germany.

== Location ==
The Altranft station marks 68.7 kilometres (43 mi) on the Eberswalde–Frankfurt (Oder) railway, as calculated from the Berlin Nordbahnhof. The district of Altranft itself lies 500 metres (1,640 ft) north of the station, and the station borders the Alte Heerstraße road. The Bad Freienwalde (Oder) station lies around 5 kilometres (3 mi) to the north, the Wriezen station about 7 kilometres (4 mi) to the south. Altranft is part of the Verkehrsverbund Berlin-Brandenburg, the transport association serving the federal states of Berlin and Brandenburg.
