= Höhenland =

- Municipality
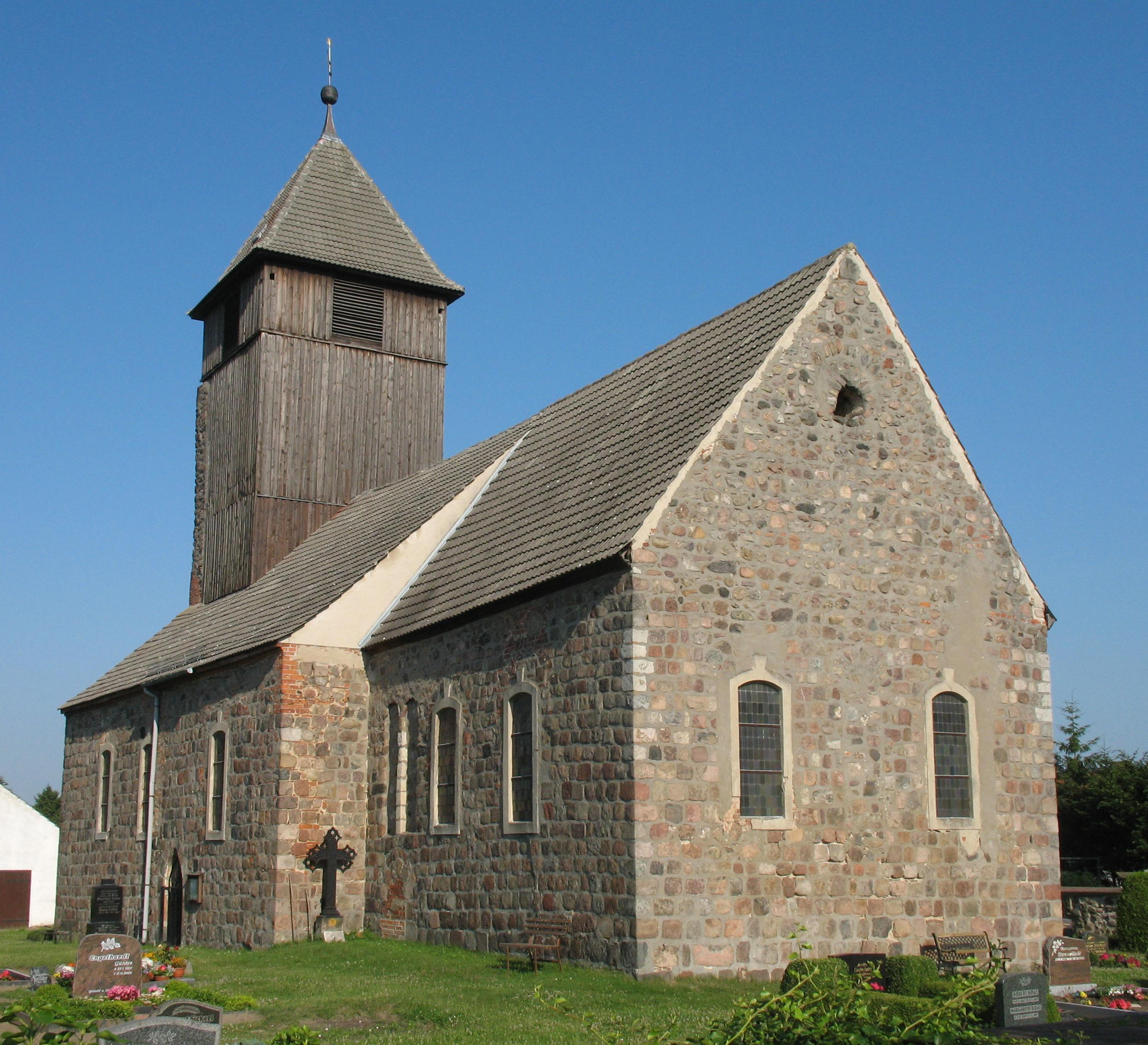
- Church in Leuenberg village

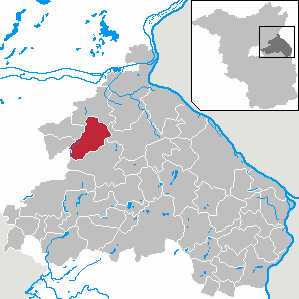
- Location of Höhenland within Märkisch-Oderland district
- Interactive map of Höhenland
- Location within Germany Location within Brandenburg
- Coordinates: 52°42′00″N 13°52′59″E
- Country: Germany
- State: Brandenburg
- District: Märkisch-Oderland
- Municipal assoc.: Falkenberg-Höhe

Government
  - Mayor (2024–29): Karsten Eschner

Area
  - Total: 53.83 km^{2} (20.78 sq mi)
- Elevation: 115 m (377 ft)

Population (2025-12-31)
  - Total: 1,049
  - Density: 19.49/km^{2} (50.47/sq mi)
- Time zone: UTC+01:00 (CET)
  - Summer (DST): UTC+02:00 (CEST)
- Postal codes: 16259
- Dialling codes: 033454
- Vehicle registration: MOL

Höhenland is a municipality in the district Märkisch-Oderland, in Brandenburg, Germany.

== Demography ==
Development of population since 1875 within the current boundaries (Blue line: Population; Dotted line: Comparison to population development of Brandenburg state; Grey background: Time of Nazi rule; Red background: Time of communist rule)

Höhenland: Population development
within the current boundaries (2013)

| Year | Pop. | ±% p.a. |
|---|---|---|
| 1875 | 1,141 | — |
| 1890 | 1,081 | −0.36% |
| 1910 | 1,002 | −0.38% |
| 1925 | 1,179 | +1.09% |
| 1933 | 1,115 | −0.70% |
| 1939 | 1,089 | −0.39% |
| 1946 | 1,576 | +5.42% |
| 1950 | 1,763 | +2.84% |
| 1964 | 1,426 | −1.50% |
| 1971 | 1,409 | −0.17% |
| 1981 | 1,071 | −2.71% |
| 1985 | 988 | −2.00% |
| 1989 | 952 | −0.92% |
| 1990 | 953 | +0.11% |
| 1991 | 906 | −4.93% |
| 1992 | 901 | −0.55% |
| 1993 | 893 | −0.89% |
| 1994 | 942 | +5.49% |
| 1995 | 903 | −4.14% |
| 1996 | 928 | +2.77% |

| Year | Pop. | ±% p.a. |
|---|---|---|
| 1997 | 940 | +1.29% |
| 1998 | 954 | +1.49% |
| 1999 | 1,003 | +5.14% |
| 2000 | 1,064 | +6.08% |
| 2001 | 1,087 | +2.16% |
| 2002 | 1,073 | −1.29% |
| 2003 | 1,073 | +0.00% |
| 2004 | 1,097 | +2.24% |
| 2005 | 1,094 | −0.27% |
| 2006 | 1,075 | −1.74% |
| 2007 | 1,077 | +0.19% |
| 2008 | 1,063 | −1.30% |
| 2009 | 1,048 | −1.41% |
| 2010 | 1,029 | −1.81% |
| 2011 | 1,018 | −1.07% |
| 2012 | 1,020 | +0.20% |
| 2013 | 1,051 | +3.04% |
| 2014 | 1,036 | −1.43% |
| 2015 | 1,026 | −0.97% |
| 2016 | 1,016 | −0.97% |

Wölsickendorf

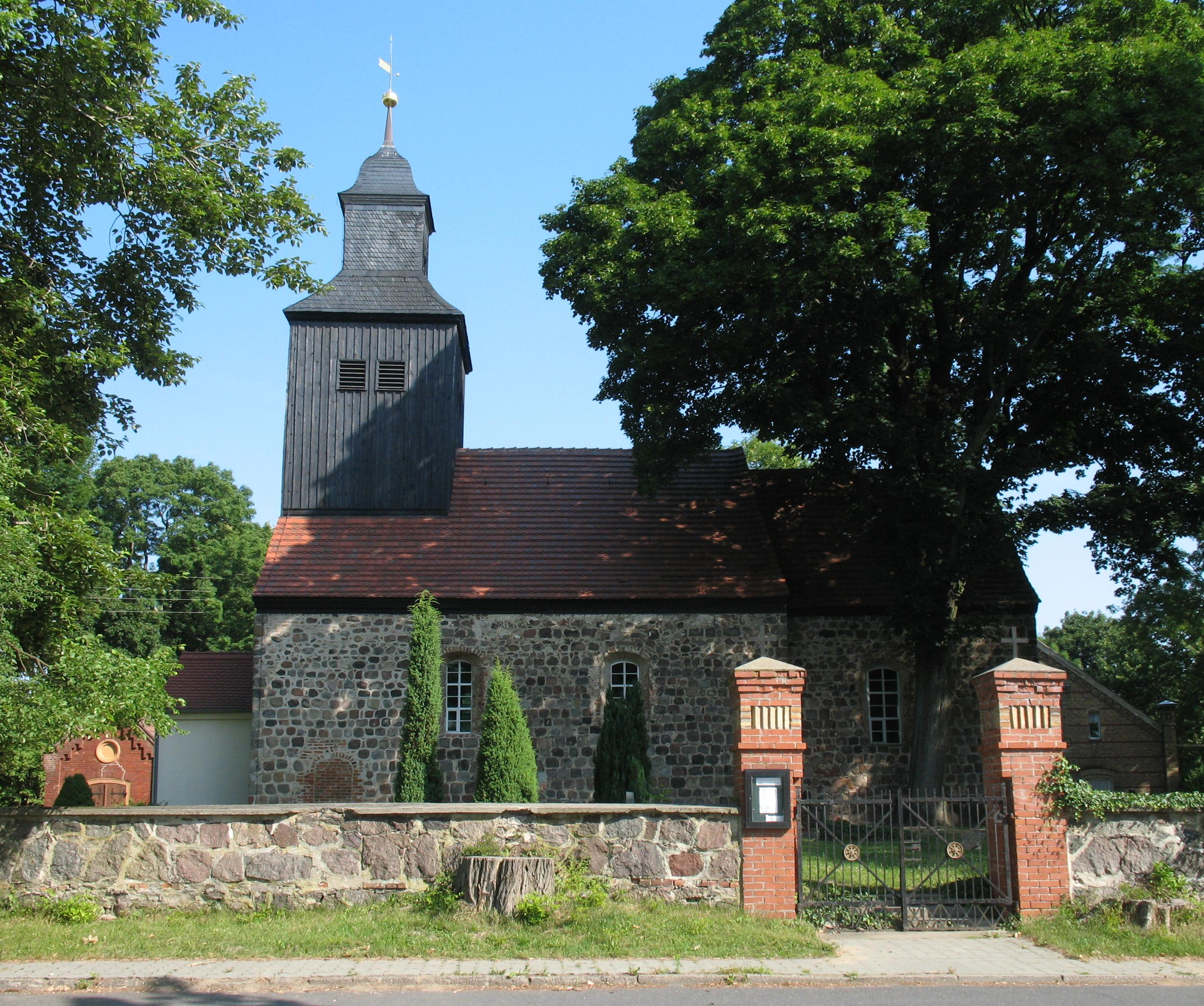
Church

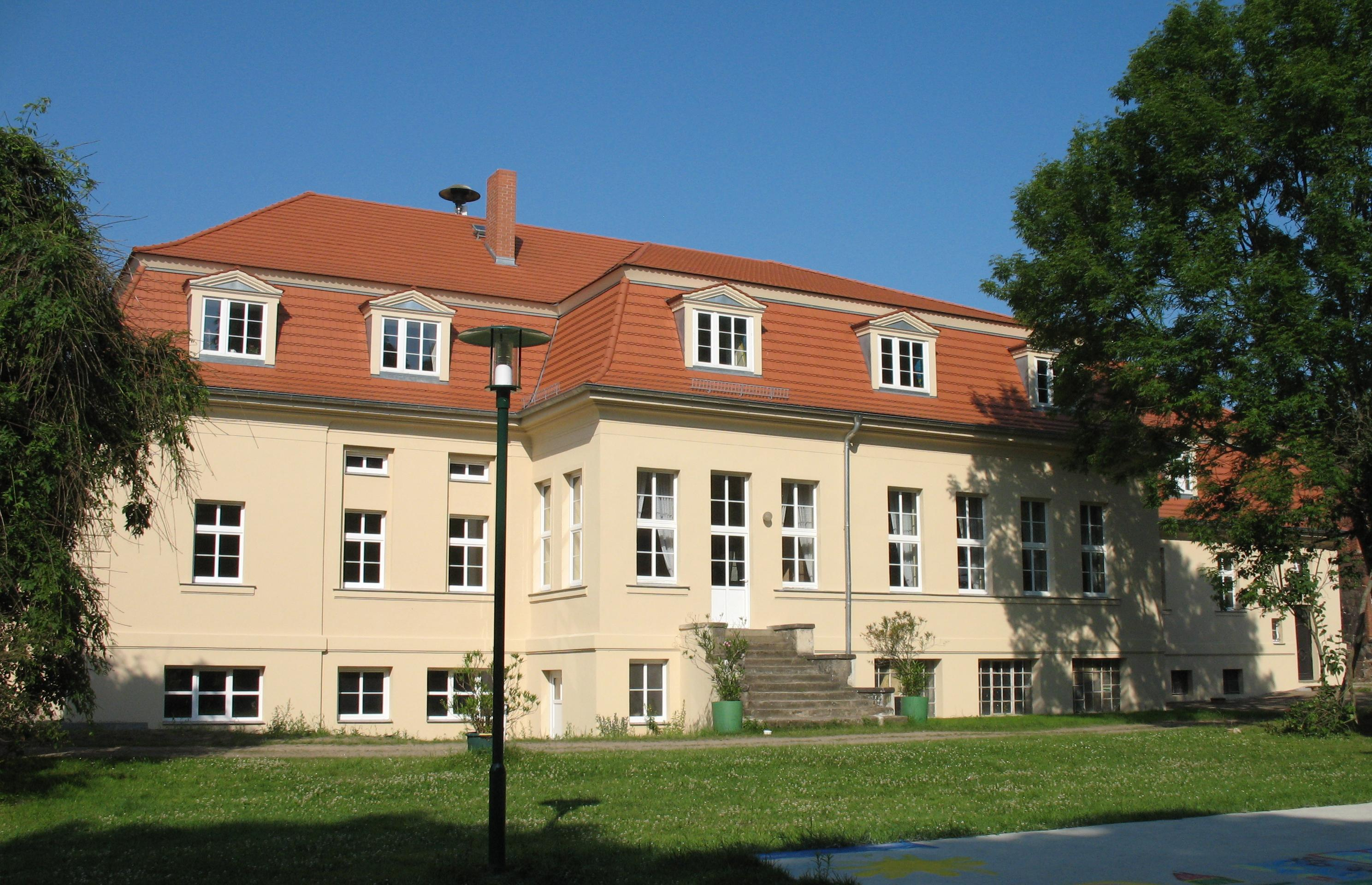
Manor house

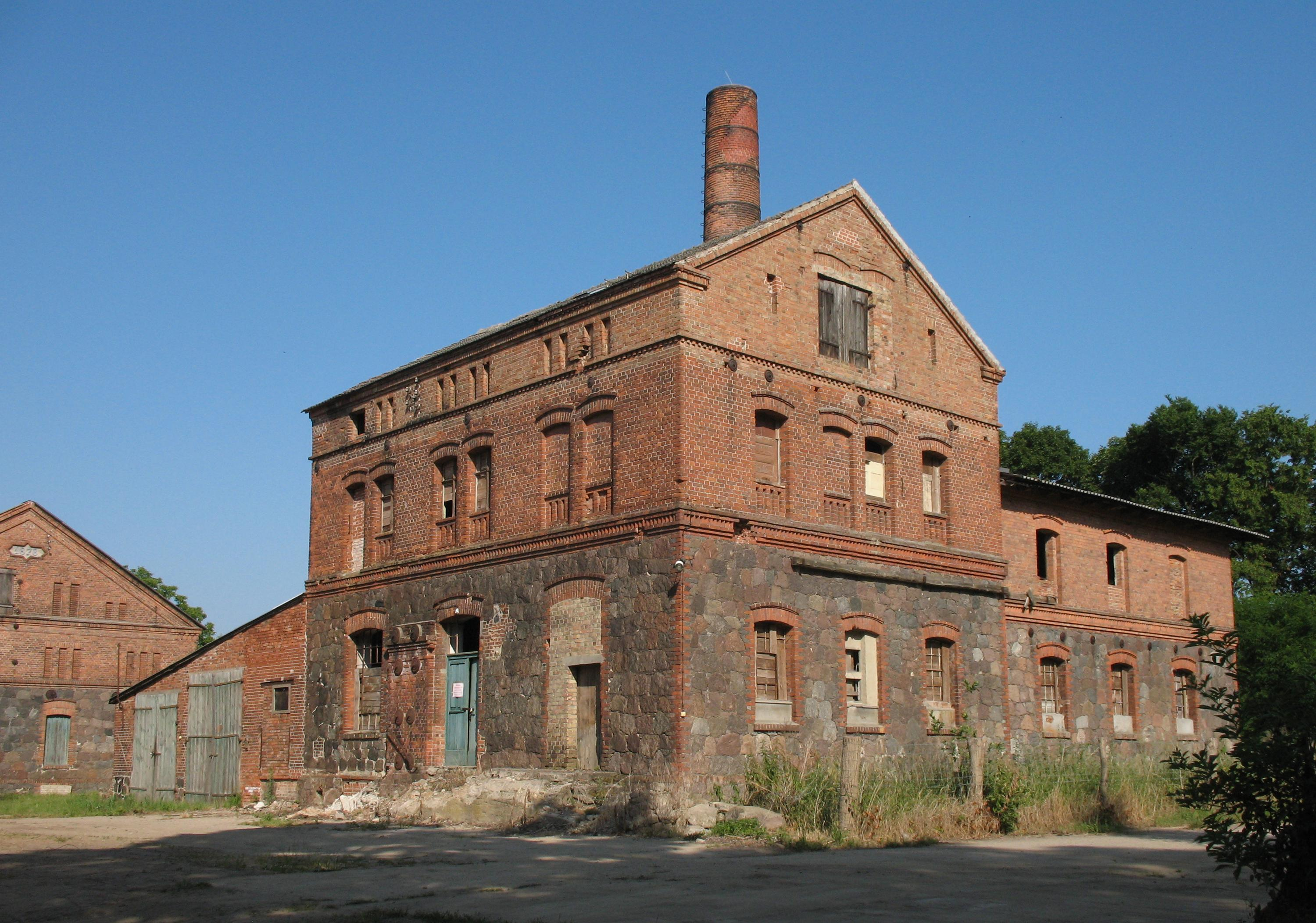
Former Distillery

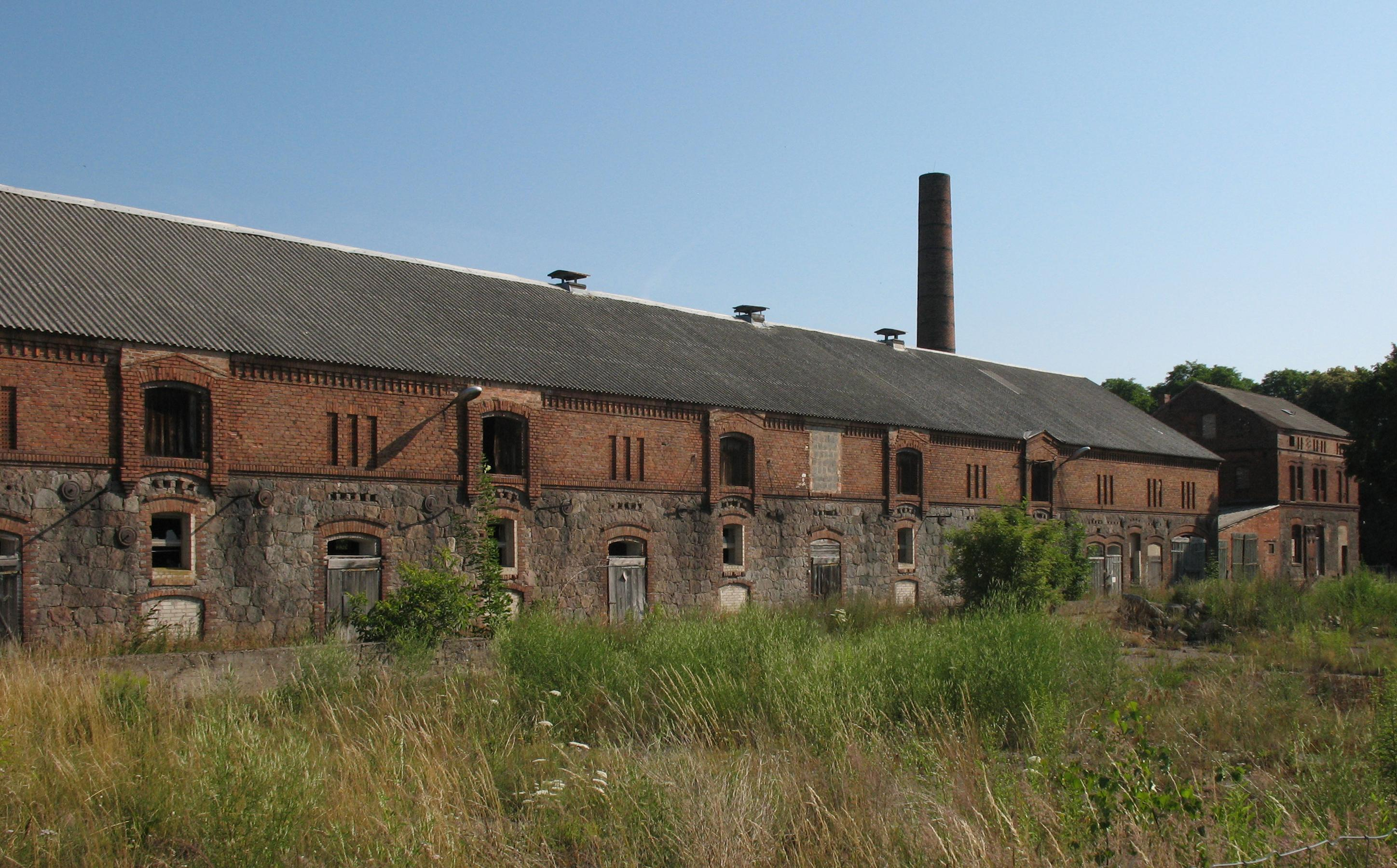
Barnyard

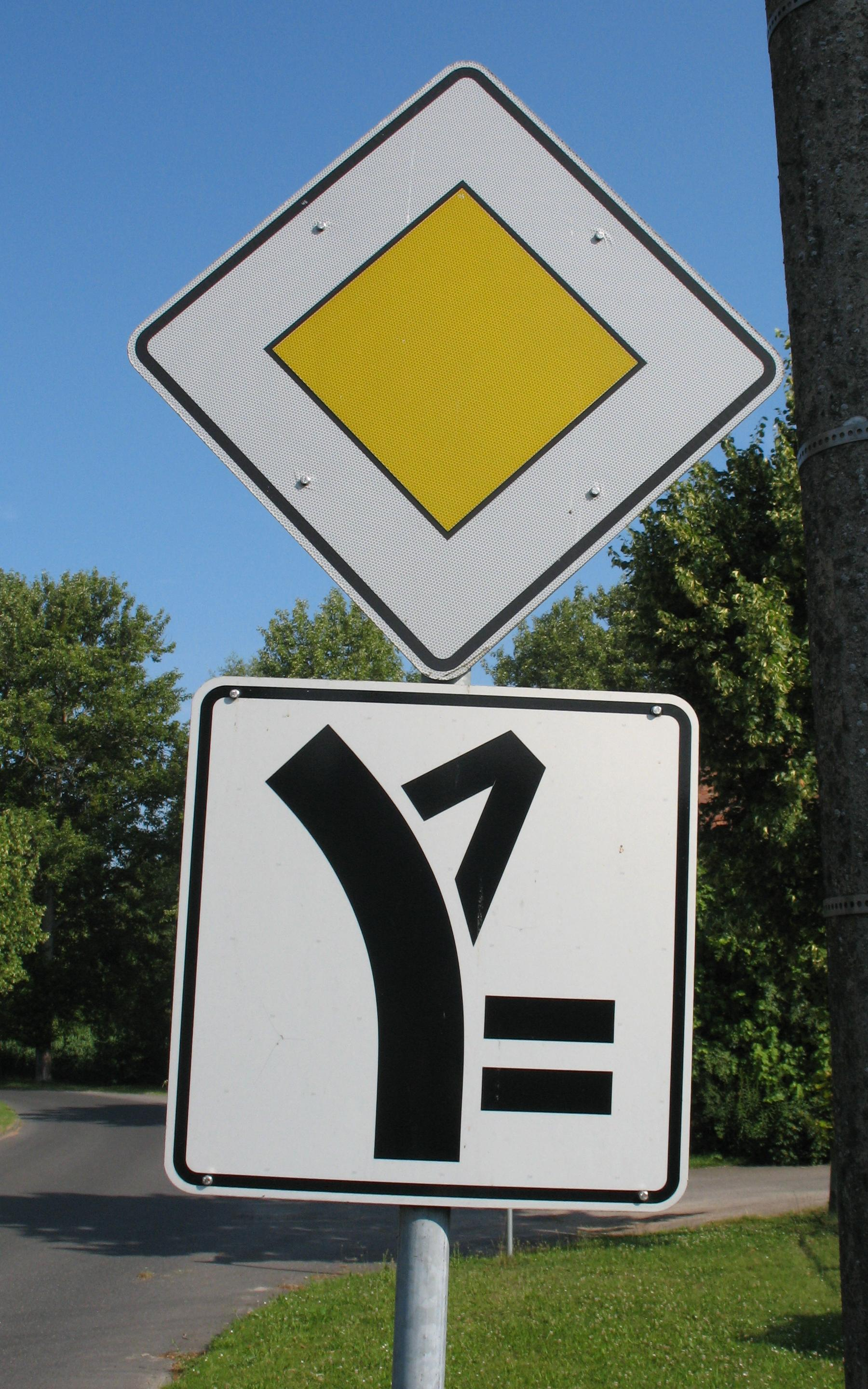
Traffic sign
