= Bad Freienwalde (Oder) station =

Railway station in Bad Freienwalde, Germany

Bad Freienwalde (Oder)
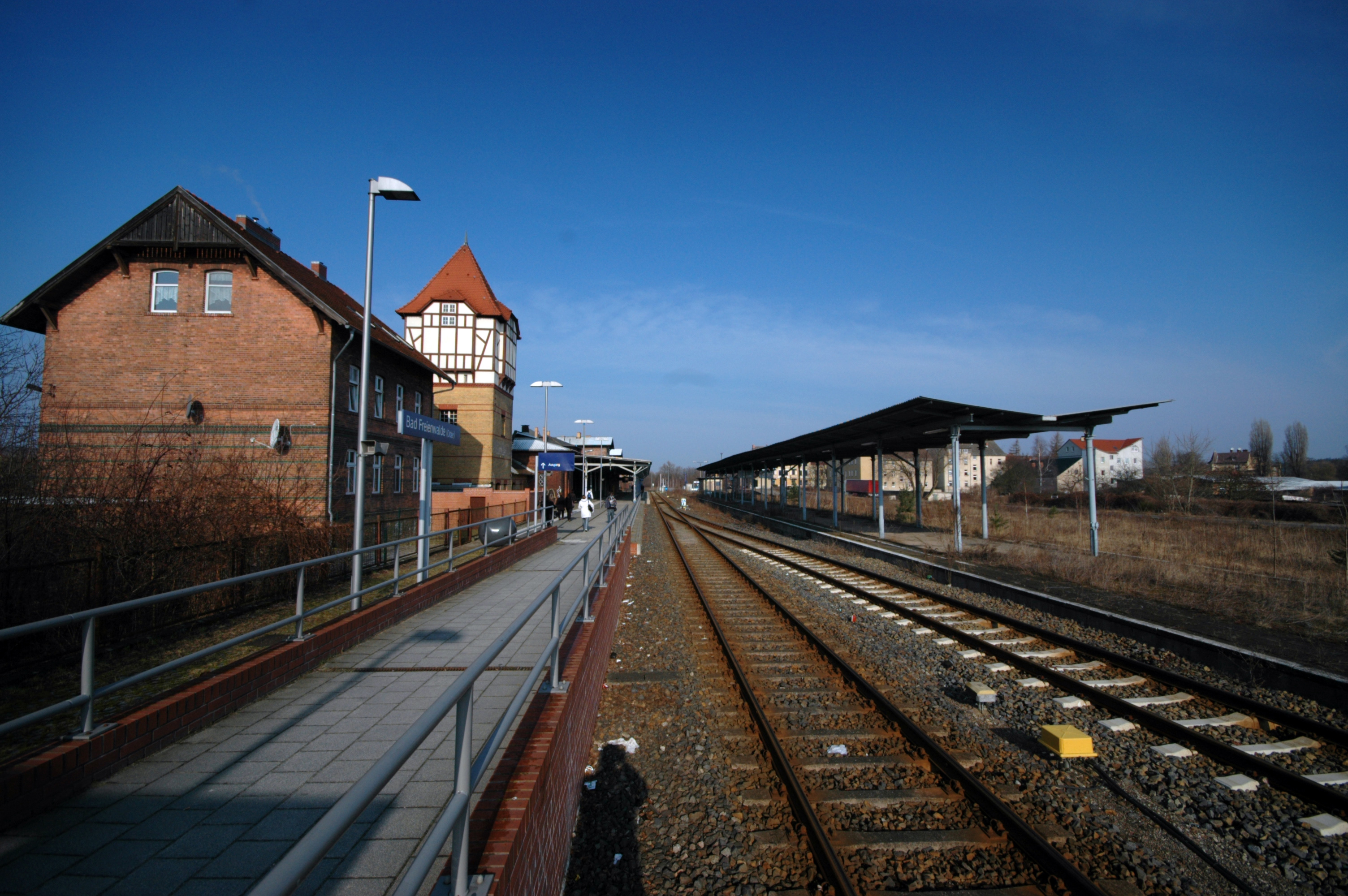
- 2010

General information
- Location: Am Bahnhof 1; 16259 Bad Freienwalde (Oder); Brandenburg; Germany
- Coordinates: 52.7900°N 14.0354°E
- Owner: DB Netz
- Operator: DB Station&Service
- Lines: Eberswalde–Frankfurt (Oder) railway (KBS 209.60); Angermünde–Bad Freienwalde (Oder) railway
- Platforms: 1 side platform
- Tracks: 2
- Train operators: Niederbarnimer Eisenbahn

Other information
- Station code: 276
- DS100 code: WFW
- IBNR: 8010017
- Category: 6
- Fare zone: : 4965
- Website: www.bahnhof.de

History
- Opened: 15 December 1866; 159 years ago

Services
Preceding station	Niederbarnimer Eisenbahn	Following station
Falkenberg (Mark) towards Eberswalde Hbf	RB 60	Altranft towards Frankfurt (Oder)
Location
- Location within Brandenburg

Bad Freienwalde (Oder) station is a railway station in the spa town of Bad Freienwalde (Oder), located in the Märkisch-Oderland district in Brandenburg, Germany.
