= Niederfinow station =

Railway station in Niederfinow, Germany

Niederfinow
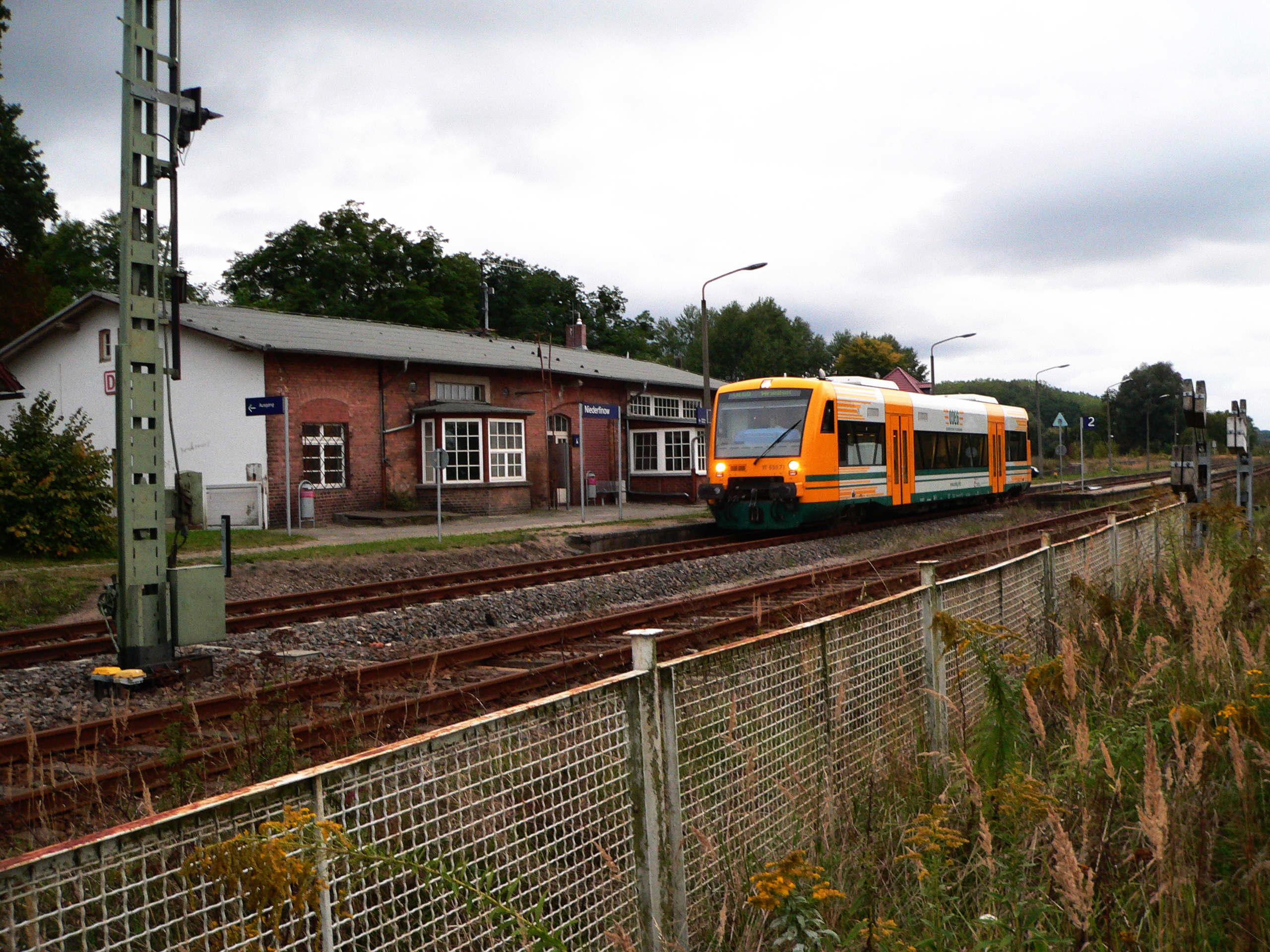
- 2008

General information
- Location: Am Bahnhof 1; 16248 Niederfinow; Brandenburg; Germany
- Coordinates: 52.8308°N 13.9282°E
- Owner: DB Netz
- Operator: DB Station&Service
- Lines: Eberswalde–Frankfurt (Oder) railway (KBS 209.60)
- Platforms: 2 side platforms
- Tracks: 2
- Train operators: Niederbarnimer Eisenbahn

Other information
- Station code: 4494
- DS100 code: WNW
- IBNR: 8012485
- Category: 6
- Fare zone: VBB: 4764
- Website: www.bahnhof.de

Services
Preceding station	Niederbarnimer Eisenbahn	Following station
Eberswalde Hbf Terminus	RB 60	Falkenberg (Mark) towards Frankfurt (Oder)
Location
- Location within Brandenburg

Niederfinow station is a railway station in the municipality of Niederfinow, located in the Barnim district in Brandenburg, Germany.
