= Wriezen station =

Railway station in Wriezen, Germany

Wriezen
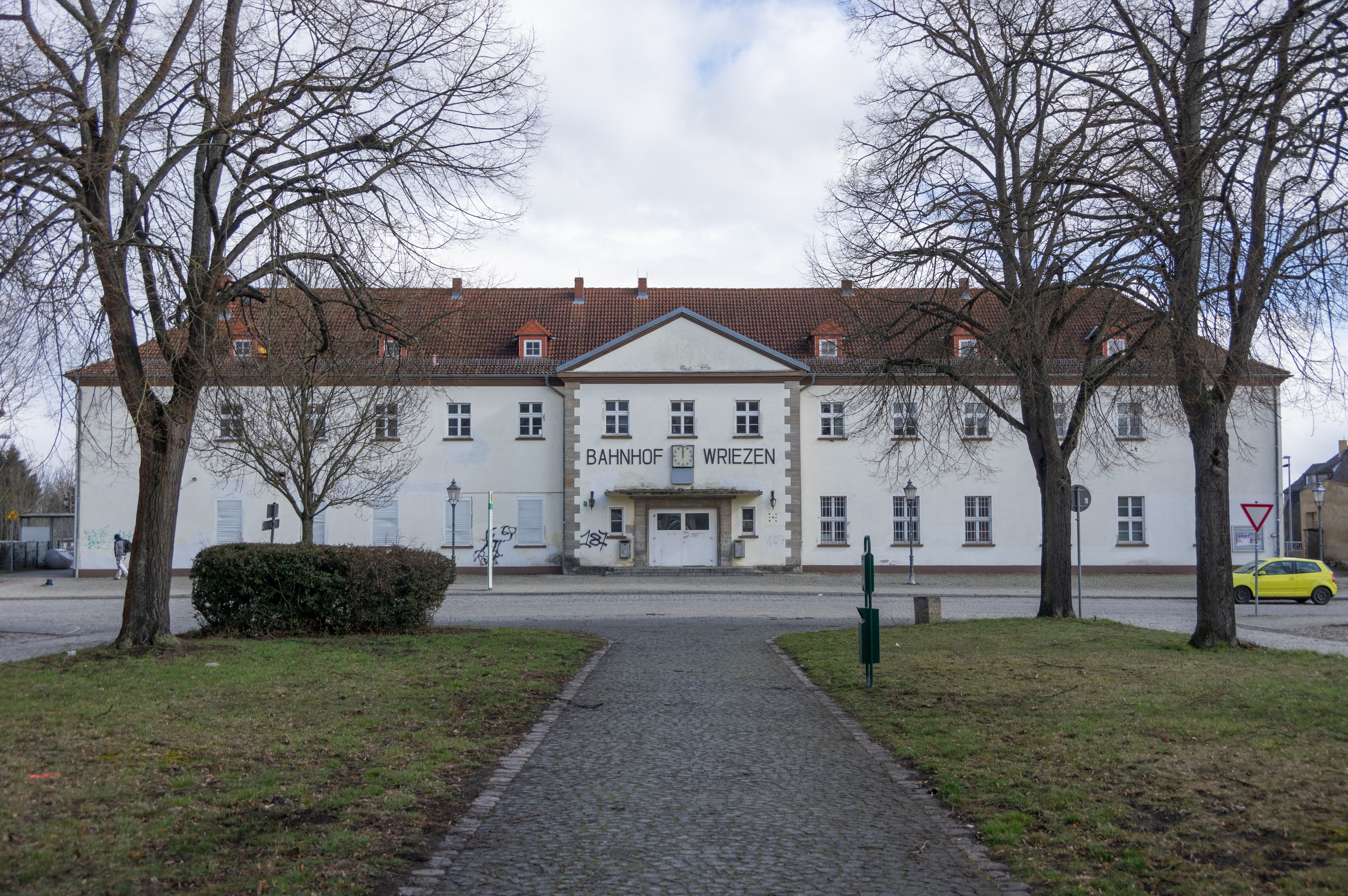
- 2012

General information
- Location: Bahnhofstraße 30; 16269 Wriezen; Brandenburg; Germany
- Coordinates: 52°42′56″N 14°08′24″E
- Owner: DB Netz
- Operator: DB Station&Service
- Lines: Eberswalde–Frankfurt (Oder) railway (KBS 209.60); Wriezen Railway (KBS 209.25); Fürstenwalde–Wriezen railway (closed)
- Platforms: 2 side platforms
- Tracks: 2
- Train operators: Niederbarnimer Eisenbahn

Other information
- Station code: 6896
- DS100 code: BWRZ
- IBNR: 8010386
- Category: 6
- Fare zone: VBB: 5167
- Website: www.bahnhof.de

History
- Opened: 15 December 1866; 159 years ago

Services
Preceding station	Niederbarnimer Eisenbahn	Following station
Altranft towards Eberswalde Hbf	RB 60	Neutrebbin towards Frankfurt (Oder)
Location
- Location within Brandenburg

Wriezen station is a railway station in the municipality of Wriezen, located in the Märkisch-Oderland district in Brandenburg, Germany.
