= Beiersdorf-Freudenberg =

- Municipality
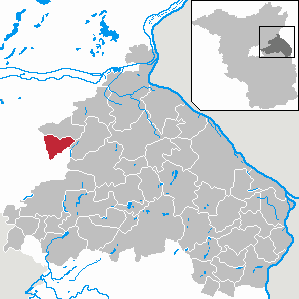
- Location of Beiersdorf-Freudenberg within Märkisch-Oderland district
- Interactive map of Beiersdorf-Freudenberg
- Location within Germany Location within Brandenburg
- Coordinates: 52°41′48″N 13°48′5″E
- Country: Germany
- State: Brandenburg
- District: Märkisch-Oderland
- Municipal assoc.: Falkenberg-Höhe
- Subdivisions: 2 Ortsteile

Government
  - Mayor (2024–29): Willi Huwe (Ind.)

Area
  - Total: 25.08 km^{2} (9.68 sq mi)
- Elevation: 85 m (279 ft)

Population (2025-12-31)
  - Total: 632
  - Density: 25.2/km^{2} (65.3/sq mi)
- Time zone: UTC+01:00 (CET)
  - Summer (DST): UTC+02:00 (CEST)
- Postal codes: 16259
- Dialling codes: 033451
- Vehicle registration: MOL

Beiersdorf-Freudenberg is a municipality in the district Märkisch-Oderland, in Brandenburg, Germany.

== History ==
On 31 December 2001, the municipality of Beiersdorf-Freudenberg was formed by merging the municipalities of Beiersdorf and Freudenberg.

From 1815 to 1947, Beiersdorf and Freudenberg were part of the Prussian Province of Brandenburg, from 1947 to 1952 of the State of Brandenburg, from 1952 to 1990 of the Bezirk Frankfurt of East Germany and since 1990 again of Brandenburg, since 2001 united as Beiersdorf-Freudenberg.

== Demography ==
Development of population since 1875 within the current boundaries (Blue line: Population; Dotted line: Comparison to population development of Brandenburg state; Grey background: Time of Nazi rule; Red background: Time of communist rule)

Beiersdorf-Freudenberg: Population development
within the current boundaries (2013)

Year	Pop.	±% p.a.
1875	1,060	—
1890	1,113	+0.33%
1910	1,160	+0.21%
1925	947	−1.34%
1933	917	−0.40%
1939	947	+0.54%
1946	1,038	+1.32%
1950	1,101	+1.48%
1964	923	−1.25%
1971	911	−0.19%
1981	749	−1.94%
1985	751	+0.07%
1989	705	−1.57%
1990	687	−2.55%
1991	690	+0.44%
1992	685	−0.72%
1993	666	−2.77%
1994	677	+1.65%
1995	686	+1.33%
1996	659	−3.94%

Year	Pop.	±% p.a.
1997	671	+1.82%
1998	658	−1.94%
1999	664	+0.91%
2000	654	−1.51%
2001	643	−1.68%
2002	641	−0.31%
2003	648	+1.09%
2004	637	−1.70%
2005	631	−0.94%
2006	621	−1.58%
2007	604	−2.74%
2008	583	−3.48%
2009	579	−0.69%
2010	566	−2.25%
2011	569	+0.53%
2012	574	+0.88%
2013	594	+3.48%
2014	598	+0.67%
2015	593	−0.84%
2016	604	+1.85%

== Photogallery ==
Beiersdorf

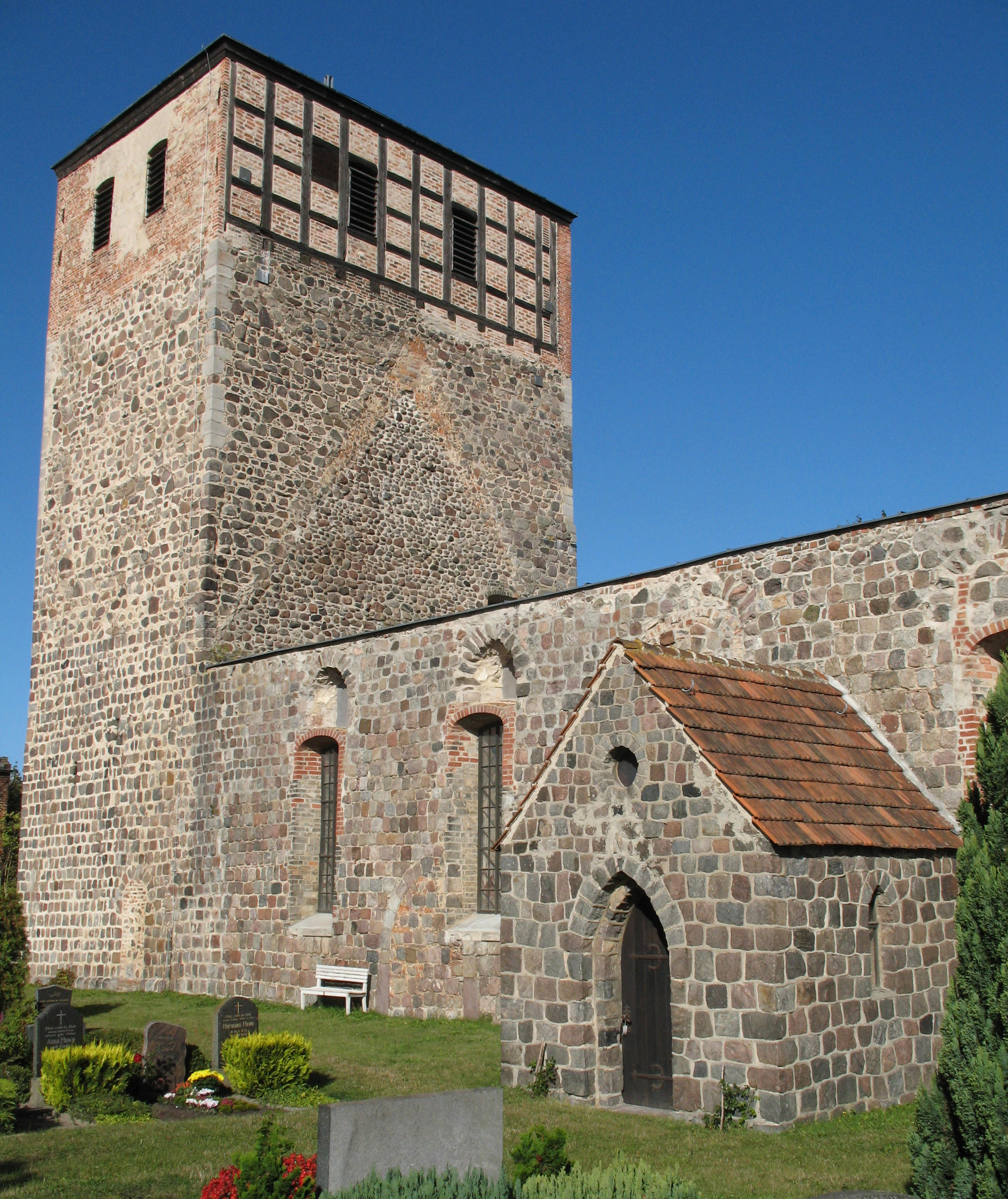
Church

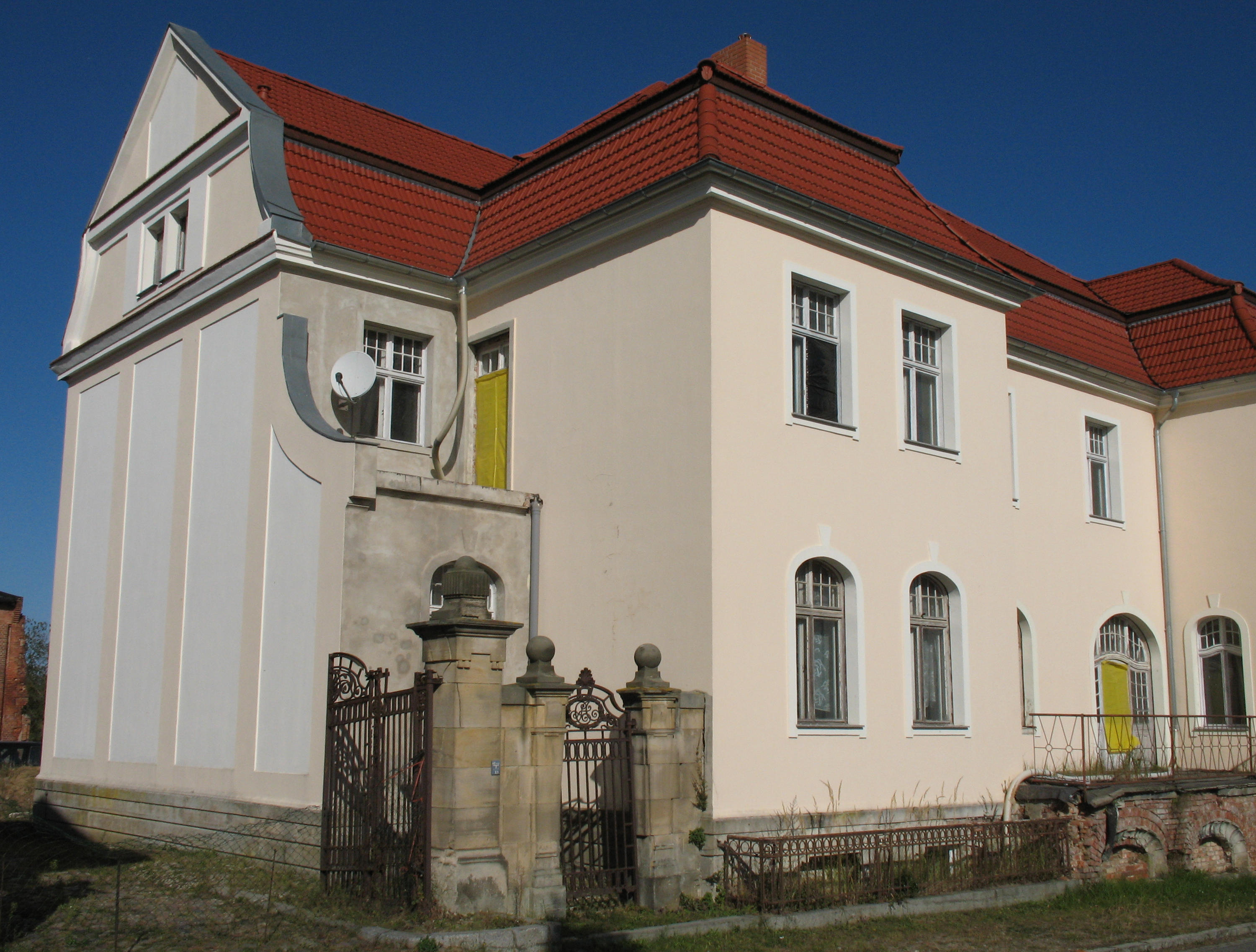
Manor

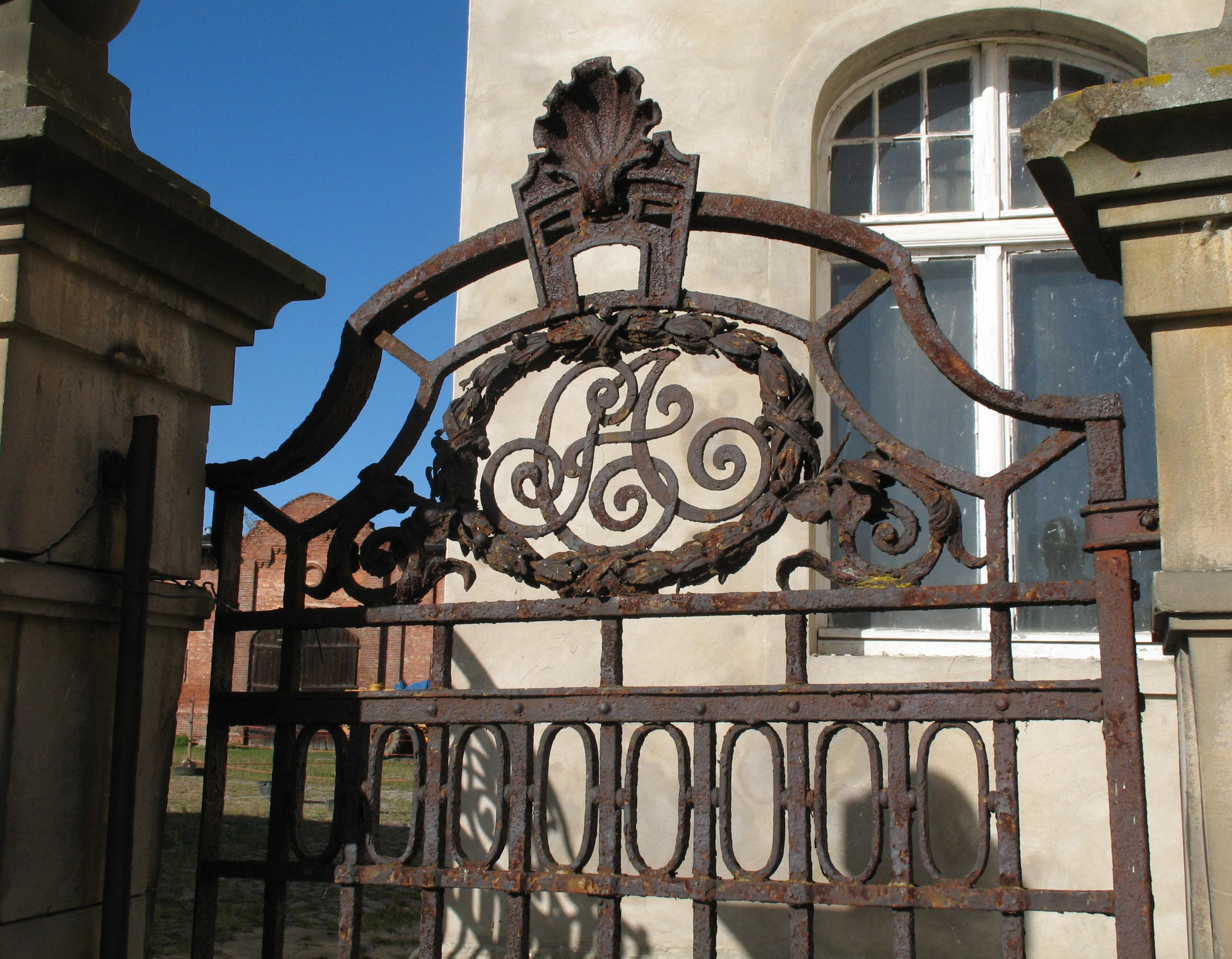
