= Ostvorpommern =

Coordinates: 53°56′N 13°40′E

- District
- Flag Coat of arms

- Country: Germany
- State: Mecklenburg-Vorpommern
- Founded: 1994
- Disbanded: 2011
- Capital: Anklam

Area
  - Total: 1,899 km^{2} (733 sq mi)

Population (2010-12-31)
  - Total: 105,036
  - Density: 55.31/km^{2} (143.3/sq mi)
- Time zone: UTC+01:00 (CET)
  - Summer (DST): UTC+02:00 (CEST)
- Vehicle registration: OVP
- Website: http://www.kreis-ovp.de

Ostvorpommern (German pronunciation: [ˈɔstˌfoːɐ̯pɔmɐn], lit. 'East Western Pomerania') was a Kreis (district) in the eastern part of Mecklenburg-Western Pomerania, Germany. Neighboring districts were (from east clockwise) Uecker-Randow, Mecklenburg-Strelitz, Demmin and Nordvorpommern. The Hanseatic city of Greifswald was enclosed by the district, but did not belong to it.

== History ==
Ostvorpommern District was established on June 12, 1994 by merging the former districts of Anklam, Greifswald and Wolgast. It was merged into Vorpommern-Greifswald on 4 September 2011.

== Coat of arms ==
The coat of arms shows the griffin of Pomerania.

== Towns and municipalities ==
The subdivisions of the district were (situation August 2011):

Amt-free towns
1. Anklam
Amt-free municipalities
1. Heringsdorf

Ämter
1. Am Peenestrom; 1. Buggenhagen; 2. Hohendorf^{3}; 3. Krummin; 4. Lassan^{2}; 5. Lütow; 6. Sauzin; 7. Wolgast^{1, 2}; 8. Zemitz; 2. Anklam-Land; 1. Bargischow; 2. Blesewitz; 3. Boldekow; 4. Bugewitz; 5. Butzow; 6. Ducherow; 7. Iven; 8. Krien; 9. Krusenfelde; 10. Liepen^{3}; 11. Medow; 12. Neetzow^{3}; 13. Neu Kosenow; 14. Neuendorf A^{3}; 15. Neuendorf B^{3}; 16. Neuenkirchen; 17. Postlow; 18. Putzar^{3}; 19. Rossin; 20. Sarnow; 21. Spantekow^{1}; 22. Stolpe	3. Landhagen; 1. Behrenhoff; 2. Dargelin; 3. Dersekow; 4. Diedrichshagen; 5. Hinrichshagen; 6. Levenhagen; 7. Mesekenhagen; 8. Neuenkirchen^{1}; 9. Wackerow; 10. Weitenhagen; 4. Lubmin; 1. Brünzow; 2. Hanshagen; 3. Katzow; 4. Kemnitz; 5. Kröslin; 6. Loissin; 7. Lubmin^{1}; 8. Neu Boltenhagen; 9. Rubenow; 10. Wusterhusen; 5. Usedom-Nord; 1. Karlshagen; 2. Mölschow; 3. Peenemünde; 4. Trassenheide; 5. Zinnowitz^{1}	6. Usedom-Süd; 1. Benz; 2. Dargen; 3. Garz; 4. Kamminke; 5. Korswandt; 6. Koserow; 7. Loddin; 8. Mellenthin; 9. Pudagla; 10. Rankwitz; 11. Stolpe auf Usedom; 12. Ückeritz; 13. Usedom^{1, 2}; 14. Zempin; 15. Zirchow; 7. Züssow; 1. Bandelin; 2. Gribow; 3. Groß Kiesow; 4. Groß Polzin; 5. Gützkow^{2}; 6. Karlsburg; 7. Klein Bünzow; 8. Kölzin^{3}; 9. Lühmannsdorf; 10. Murchin; 11. Rubkow; 12. Schmatzin; 13. Wrangelsburg; 14. Ziethen; 15. Züssow^{1}
^{1} - seat of the Amt; ^{2} - town; ^{3} - former town/municipality
