= Groswin =

Castle and territory along the southern Baltic Sea

Coordinates: 53°51′38″N 13°36′54″E

The coat of arms of Groswin.

Groswin was the name-giving seat of one of the castellanies of the Duchy of Pomerania in the High Middle Ages. It was located in Western Pomerania near modern Anklam.

The castellany is thought to have comprised the area between the rivers Peene and Zarow, and the villages Rehberg, Japenzin, Iven, Crien, Wegezin, Thurow, Blesewitz and Görke. The exact location of the Groswin burgh, which was destroyed in the late 12th century, is uncertain, it may have been near Stolpe-Neuhof, Grüttow, Görke or Müggenburg. At Groswin, defense structures within the Peene river allowed the locals to block the river for ships.

Documents mention Groswin also in the spelling variants Grossvin, Groswim, Grozwin, Grozswin, Groswyn, Grosum (Knytlinga saga), Grotzuina (Saxo Grammaticus), Brotwin (946), Groswine (1136), Grozioni, Grozswine, and Grozswina.

Groswin took over the position of nearby Altes Lager Menzlin as a trade center after its decline in the 9th century. The tribal affiliation of the inhabitants, though associated with the greater tribe of the Veleti, is uncertain – while the Ukrani are reported to have dwelled south of the Zarow and the Rani north of the Ryck river, the name of the medieval inhabitants of the area between these rivers is not reported. The lands of Groswin became a castellany of the Duchy of Pomerania during the westward expansion of Wartislaw I in the 1120s, and became part of the Bishopric of Cammin in 1140. In 1153, Stolpe Abbey was founded in the Groswin castellany as the first Pomeranian monastery. A market at the Groswin burgh is documented in 1159. In 1185, a Danish expedition led by Canut VI destroyed the burgh and devastated the castellany. Though the name Groswin stayed in use to refer to the area, the position of the former burgh as the areas center was taken over by nearby Anklam.

== See also ==
- Pomerania during the Early Middle Ages
- Pomerania during the High Middle Ages
- Altes Lager Menzlin
- Anklam
