= List of Danish campaigns in Pomerania =

Danish expeditions of into the Duchy of Pomerania and the Principality of Rügen
Date	Destination, notes
1042–1047	Rügen, Iumne (destroyed 1043)
1080–1086	Rügen
1098	Julin (subdued)
1129 or 1130	Usedom, Julin
1136	Pomerania, Rügen (Arkona)
1150	Pomerania
Summer 1159	Hiddensee and Barth
Fall 1159	Rügen (Arkona)
1160	Pomerania, with support of the Rani and Henry the Lion
Spring 1162	Wolgast, defeat of Pomeranian forces, Danes carry off Pomeranian hostages
July 1164	Mecklenburg and Pomerania, together with Henry the Lion who defeats the Wends in the Battle of Verchen
Fall 1164	Rügen, devastation of the coastline
April/May 1165	Rügen (Arkona, Zudar, Garz), also Pomeranian-claimed territory (Tribsees devastated)
Fall 1165	Rügen (Arkona, Jasmund, Mönchgut)
March/April 1166	Tribsees
May 1166	Wolgast, "Ostrozne" (thought to be Wusterhusen). Henry the Lion protests that Valdemar I of Denmark attacked his vassal, Bogislaw I, Duke of Pomerania.
September/October 1166	Demmin, Wolgast, Usedom
June 1168	Siege of Arkona, Rügen becomes Danish principality. In 1169, Valdemar pledges allegiance to Frederick I, Holy Roman Emperor (Barbarossa), and in turn is permitted to campaign in Pomerania as he likes.
Fall 1170	Wollin and Kammin, Oder estuary
1171	Tribsees (in May), Circipania
1173	"Gorgasia", Wollin, Kammin, Usedom, Stettin. Poland sends relief forces to besieged Bogislaw in Stettin, Denmark nevertheless sacks the burgh, the castellan becomes a Danish vassal.
1174	Danish preparations for a further campaign fail, two-year peace settlement with the Wends
June 1177	Valdemar demands that Henry the Lion campaigns in Pomerania, Henry besieges Demmin for 10 weeks
1177	Wolgast, Groswin, Demmin, supported by Henry the Lion. Oder Lagoon area.
1178	"Ostrozno" (thought to be Wusterhusen, in the spring), Wolgast
Spring 1184	On demand of Frederick I, Holy Roman Emperor (Barbarossa), his vassal Bogislaw I, Duke of Pomerania, mounts a naval attack against Danish vassal Jaromar I, Prince of Rügen, to punish Valdemar's son Kanut for not pledging allegiance to the emperor. Utter defeat of the Pomeranian navy in the Battle of Bay of Greifswald.
Summer 1184	Wolgast and Usedom (unsuccessful), Wollin (destroyed)
After 22 September 1184	Pomerania
Late 1184	Tribsees
April/May 1185	Wolgast, Groswin, Kammin.Bogislaw I, Duke of Pomerania, pledges allegiance to Canut VI of Denmark.
1189	Stettin
1198–1199	Danish and Brandenburgian forces under Margrave Otto II fight against each other in Mecklenburg, the Principality of Rügen, and the Peene area. Demmin gets destroyed.
(1214)	Frederick II, Holy Roman Emperor renounces his claims to the areas east of the Elde and Elbe rivers (including Rügen and Pomerania) in favour of Denmark
(1227)	Utter Danish defeat in the Battle of Bornhöved, end of Danish rule in Pomerania, principality of Rügen remains with Denmark.
1228	Pomeranians attack and sack Danish-held Wolgast
1233	Demmin sacked by Valdemar II of Denmark
1234	Wartislaw III, Duke of Pomerania and Lübeck attack and sack Danish-held Demmin
