= Heinrich Harder =

German artist and professor

- Born: 2 June 1858; Putzar
- Died: 5 February 1935 (aged 76); Berlin
- Occupation: Scientific illustration

Heinrich Harder (2 June 1858 – 5 February 1935) was a German artist and an art professor at the Prussian Academy of Arts in Berlin best known for his depictions of extinct animals.

== Life ==
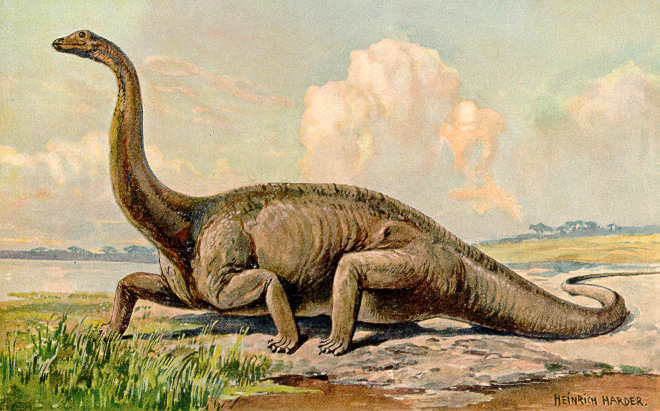
Diplodocus, c. 1913

Heinrich Harder was born in Putzar, Pomerania, the son of a farmer. From 1874 to 1876, he studied at the Royal Art School in Berlin, followed by tutoring by Martin Gropius and later (1890–1892) with Eugen Bracht at the Royal Art School (Königlichen akademischen Hochschule für die Bildenden Künste) in the same city. After his studies, he settled in Steglitz, where he lived until the end of his life. He shared a workshop in the Berlin suburb, on Lutherstraße 10, with the decorative artist Hans Hartmann. In addition, Harder taught from 1906 to 1923, and from 1913 as an art professor, at the Prussian Academy of Fine Arts (now the Berlin University of the Arts).

Harder died in 1935, at the age of 76. He is buried in the Steglitz cemetery.

== Work ==
As a landscape painter, Harder exhibited paintings inspired by the scenery of Lüneburg (like his mentor Bracht), Mecklenburg, the Harz mountains, Sweden and Switzerland, at the Grosse Berliner Kunstausstellung in 1891. He was also active as a decorative artist and worked for advertisement companies.

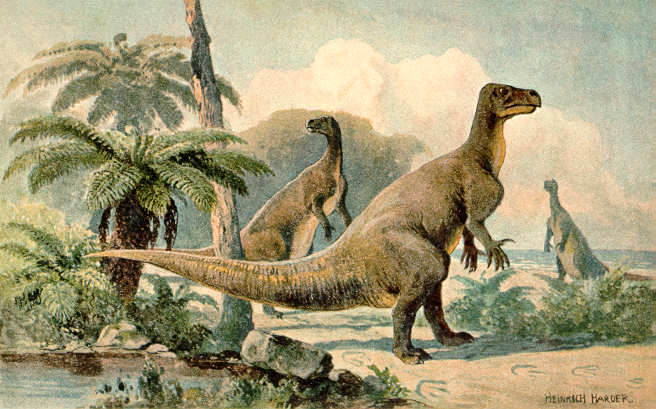
Harder's Iguanodon in the Reichardt series

In 1900, Harder prepared 60 lithographs for the series Tiere der Urwelt ("Animals of the Primeval World") by the Hamburg cocoa and chocolate manufacturer Theodor Reichardt, depicting dinosaurs, trilobites, ammonites, and primeval mammals. The writer Wilhelm Bölsche, with whom Harder had worked since 1898, described the animals on the back of the cards. In 1906 Bölsche published articles about the planet earth in the weekly magazine Die Gartenlaube, likewise illustrated by Harder. Harder was also involved as a draftsman in Bölsche's Tierbuch (1908) and Tierwanderungen in der Urwelt (1914). In 1910 he supplied designs for a collection card series similar to the Reichardt one for the Cologne chocolate producer Ludwig Stollwerck.

== Berlin Aquarium ==
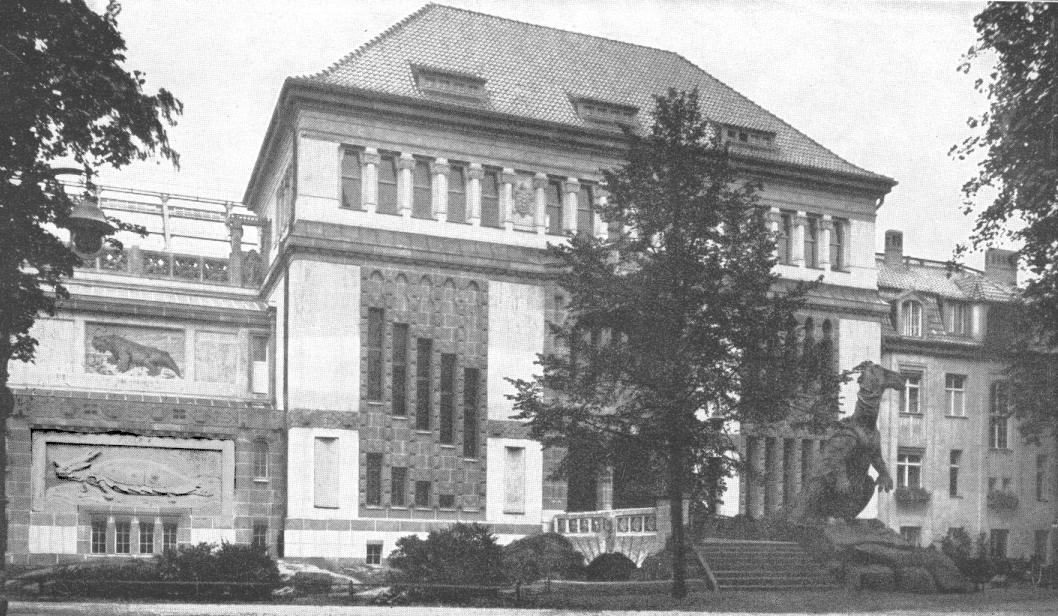
Old facade of the Berlin Aquarium with Harder's mosaic images and his sculpture of Iguanodon

In 1913, Harder designed a series of reliefs and mosaics on the two façades of the newly built aquarium of the Berlin Zoo, on the Budapester Straße and inside the zoo itself. They show prehistoric creatures, such as dinosaurs, fossil invertebrates, extinct reptiles, and extinct mammals. He also helped create a large statue of an Iguanodon on the zoo side of the aquarium building, together with the sculptor Otto Markert. When the destroyed aquarium was rebuilt after the Second World War, Harder's badly damaged pictures could not initially be restored due to lack of funds. In 1977, 14 original designs were rediscovered, which served as a template for the restoration of the murals in 1978.
