= Johannisthal =

Johannisthal may refer to:

- Johannisthal (Berlin), a locality (Ortsteil) of Treptow-Köpenick borough in Berlin
- Johannisthal Air Field, an air field near Johannisthal (Berlin)
- Johannisthal, a civil parish of Küps, in Bavaria (Germany)
- Johannisthal, a civil parish of Dersekow, in Mecklenburg-Vorpommern (Germany)
- Johannisthal, a civil parish of Lauta, in Saxony (Germany)
