= Leopoldshagen =

- Municipality
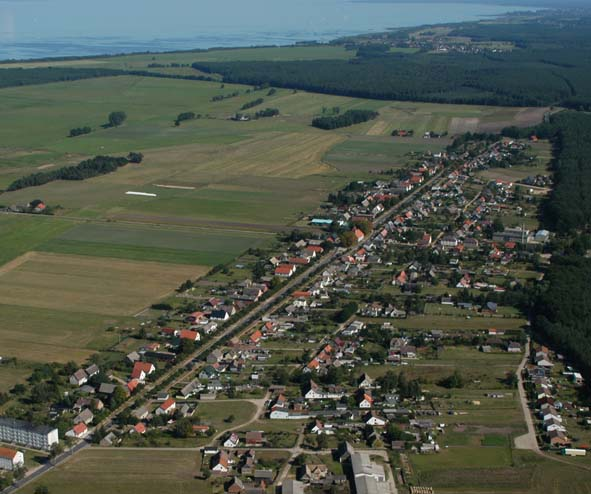
- Aerial view of Leopoldshagen

- Location of Leopoldshagen within Vorpommern-Greifswald district
- Interactive map of Leopoldshagen
- Location within Germany Location within Mecklenburg-Vorpommern
- Coordinates: 53°46′N 13°54′E
- Country: Germany
- State: Mecklenburg-Vorpommern
- District: Vorpommern-Greifswald
- Municipal assoc.: Am Stettiner Haff

Government
  - Mayor: Werner Hackbarth

Area
  - Total: 19.56 km^{2} (7.55 sq mi)
- Elevation: 6 m (20 ft)

Population (2025-12-31)
  - Total: 588
  - Density: 30.1/km^{2} (77.9/sq mi)
- Time zone: UTC+01:00 (CET)
  - Summer (DST): UTC+02:00 (CEST)
- Postal codes: 17375
- Dialling codes: 039774
- Vehicle registration: VG
- Website: www.leopoldshagen.de

Leopoldshagen is a municipality in the Vorpommern-Greifswald district, in Mecklenburg-Vorpommern, Germany.

== Geography ==
Immediately northwest of Leopoldshagen begins the Anklamer Torfmoor, a protected wetland which runs along the western shore of the Stettin Lagoon to the town of Anklam.

== History ==
The place was founded in 1748 in the Prussian Province of Pomerania. In 1752 King Frederick II of Prussia named the village in honour of his late general Leopold II, Prince of Anhalt-Dessau (1700–1751). From 1945 to 1952, Leopoldshagen was part of the State of Mecklenburg-Vorpommern, from 1952 to 1990 of the Bezirk Neubrandenburg of East Germany and since 1990 again of Mecklenburg-Vorpommern.
