= Neetzow-Liepen =

- Municipality
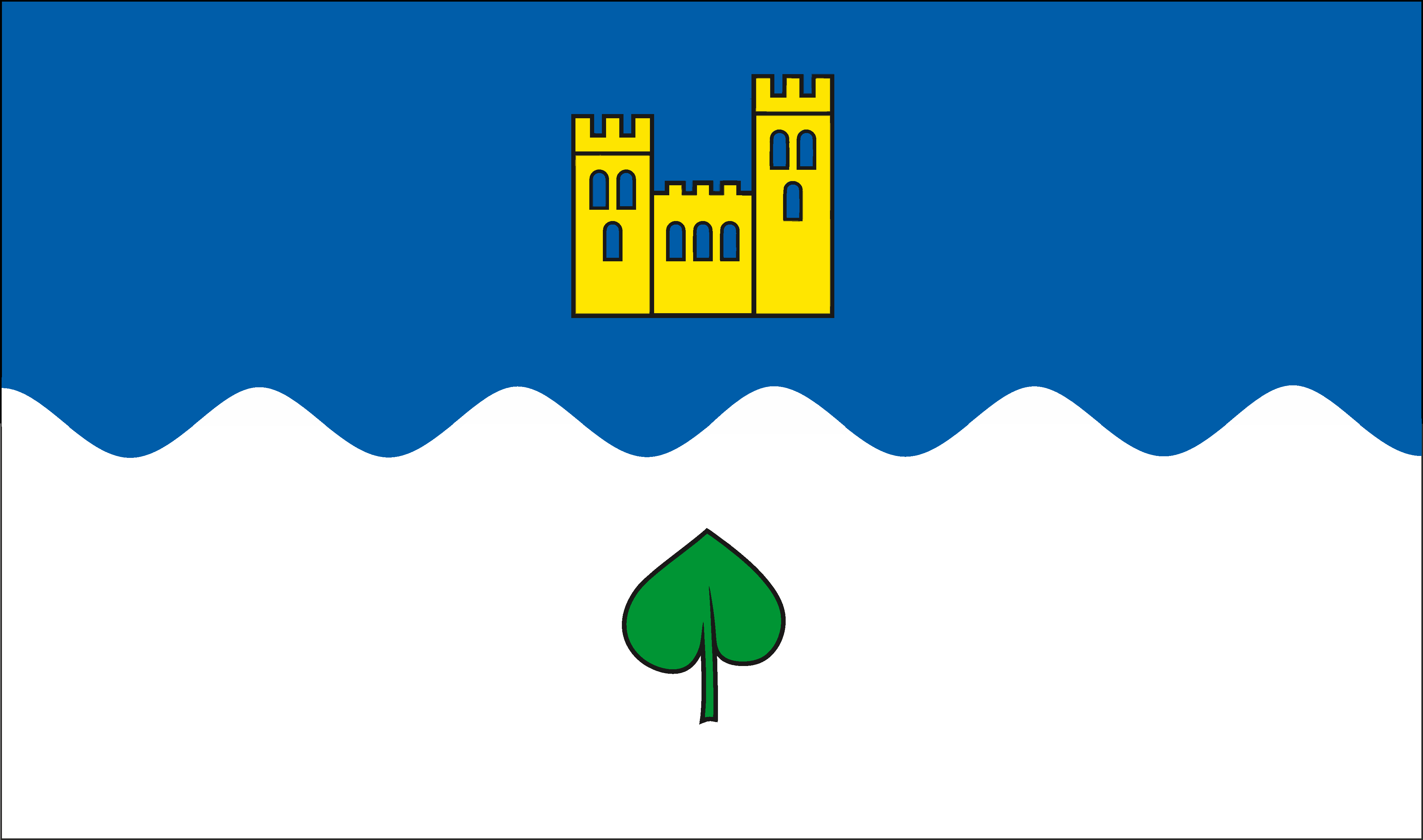
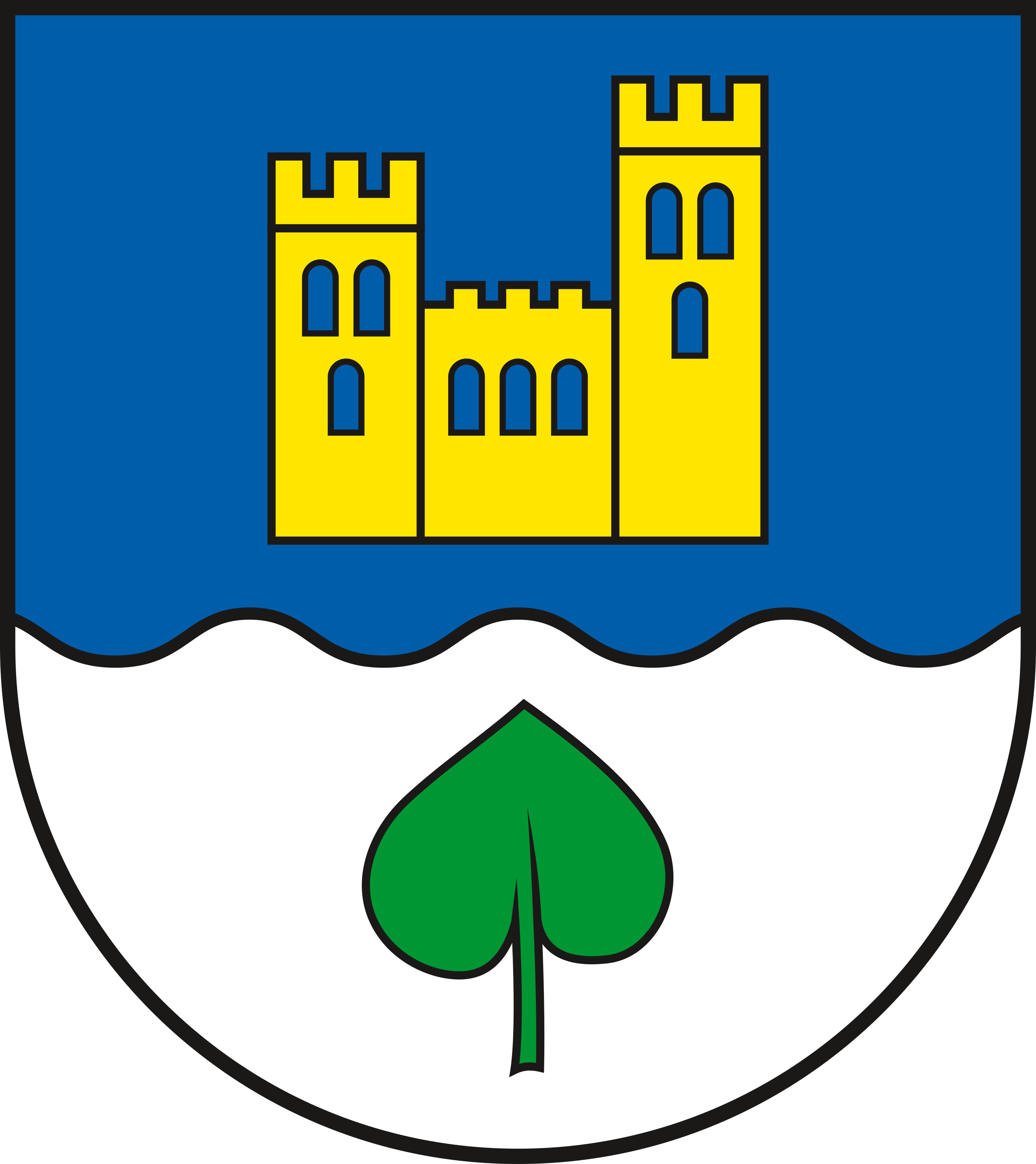
- Flag Coat of arms

- Location of Neetzow-Liepen within Vorpommern-Greifswald district
- Interactive map of Neetzow-Liepen
- Location within Germany Location within Mecklenburg-Vorpommern
- Coordinates: 53°53′N 13°26′E
- Country: Germany
- State: Mecklenburg-Vorpommern
- District: Vorpommern-Greifswald
- Municipal assoc.: Anklam-Land

Government
  - Mayor: Bernd Gladrow

Area
  - Total: 43.18 km^{2} (16.67 sq mi)
- Elevation: 12 m (39 ft)

Population (2025-12-31)
  - Total: 796
  - Density: 18.4/km^{2} (47.7/sq mi)
- Time zone: UTC+01:00 (CET)
  - Summer (DST): UTC+02:00 (CEST)
- Postal codes: 17391
- Dialling codes: 039723
- Vehicle registration: VG
- Website: www.amt-anklam-land.de

Neetzow-Liepen is a municipality in the Vorpommern-Greifswald district, in Mecklenburg-Vorpommern, Germany. It was formed on 1 January 2014 by the merger of the former municipalities Neetzow and Liepen.

== History ==
From 1648 to 1720, the constituent localities of Neetzow-Liepen were part of Swedish Pomerania. From 1720 to 1945, they were part of the Prussian Province of Pomerania, from 1945 to 1952 of the State of Mecklenburg-Vorpommern, from 1952 to 1990 of the Bezirk Neubrandenburg of East Germany and since 1990 again of Mecklenburg-Vorpommern.
