= Anklamer Torfmoor =

Area of bog on the shore of the Stettin Lagoon

Coordinates: 53°48′45″N 13°51′25″E

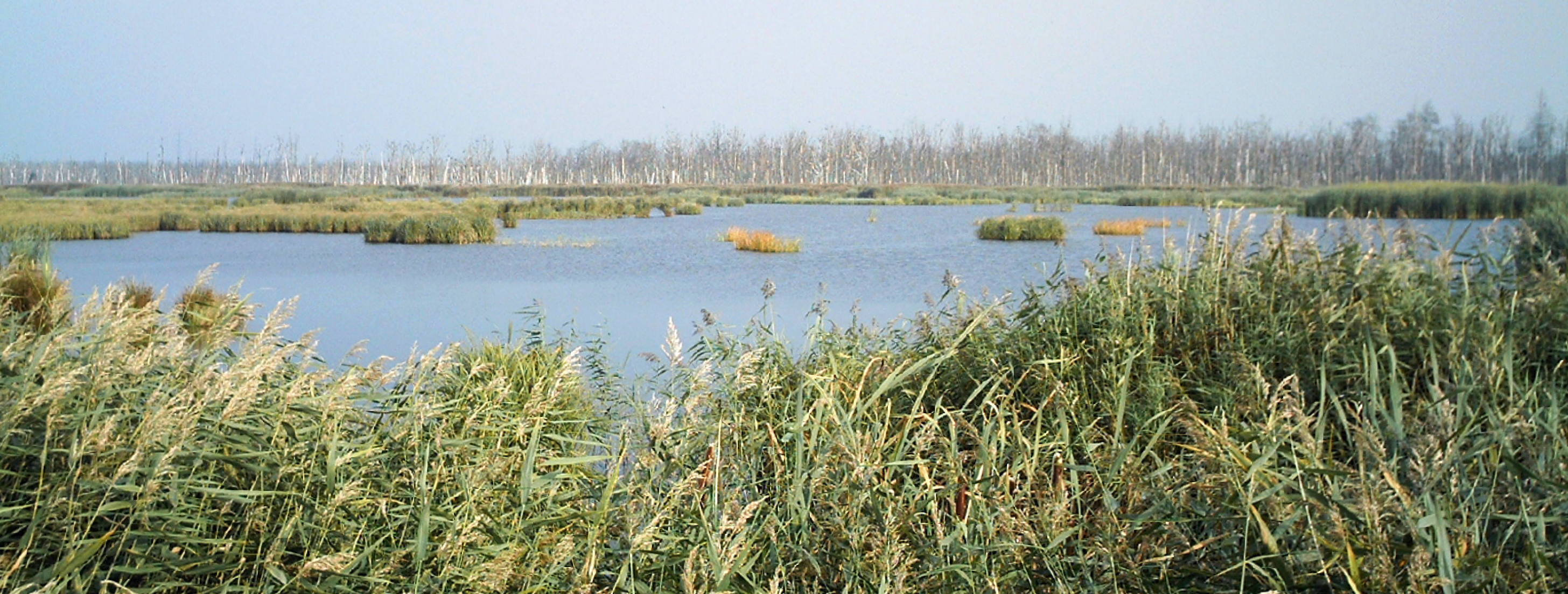

The Anklamer Torfmoor, also called the Anklamer Stadtbruch od Städtisches Torfmoor, is an extensive area of bog on the western shore of the Stettin Lagoon. Much of the area is part of the Anklamer Stadtbruch Nature Reserve.

A storm surge on 4 November 1995 caused the dyke to break and the Anklamer Stadtbruch was subsequently permanently flooded, resulting in the formation of the Anklamer Torfmoor, which was opposed by the local inhabitants who were affected. Those responsible at the time decided not to repair the embankments and not to pump out the water. Since then its use for forestry has been limited and trees are dying off.

In the past there were several attempts to drain the bog in order to extract peat. Thanks to the old farm tracks that lead into the area, almost all of it may be visited and explored. The bog lies within the borough of Anklam. The surrounding municipalities are Bargischow, Bugewitz and Leopoldshagen.

In 2020, journalist Andrew Müller in the taz mentioned the 1995 dyke breach and its impact as an "unplanned" example of so-called 'passive rewilding', a form of rewilding concept.
