= Thurow =

Thurow is a surname. Notable people with the surname include:

- Gerhard Thurow (1934–1976), German motorcyclist
- Kerstin Thurow (born 1969), German engineer
- Lester Thurow (1938–2016), American political economist and author
- Roger Thurow, American author and journalist

== See also ==
- Thurlow
