= Wackerow =

- Municipality
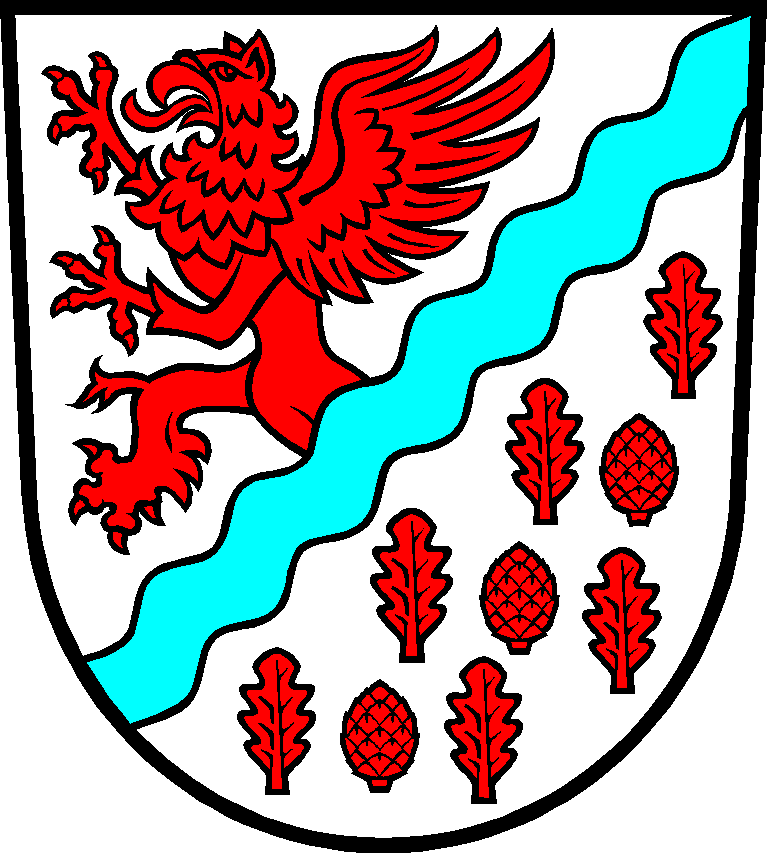
- Coat of arms

- Location of Wackerow within Vorpommern-Greifswald district
- Interactive map of Wackerow
- Location within Germany Location within Mecklenburg-Vorpommern
- Coordinates: 54°6′13″N 13°20′43″E
- Country: Germany
- State: Mecklenburg-Vorpommern
- District: Vorpommern-Greifswald
- Municipal assoc.: Landhagen
- Subdivisions: 9

Government
  - Mayor: Manfred Hering

Area
  - Total: 31.72 km^{2} (12.25 sq mi)
- Elevation: 0 m (0 ft)

Population (2025-12-31)
  - Total: 1,494
  - Density: 47.10/km^{2} (122.0/sq mi)
- Time zone: UTC+01:00 (CET)
  - Summer (DST): UTC+02:00 (CEST)
- Postal codes: 17498
- Dialling codes: 03834
- Vehicle registration: VG

Wackerow is a municipality in the Vorpommern-Greifswald district, in Mecklenburg-Vorpommern, Germany.
