= Neuenkirchen, Landhagen =

Neuenkirchen
- Municipality
- Flag Coat of arms

- Location of Neuenkirchen within Vorpommern-Greifswald district
- Interactive map of Neuenkirchen
- Location within Germany Location within Mecklenburg-Vorpommern
- Coordinates: 54°07′N 13°23′E
- Country: Germany
- State: Mecklenburg-Vorpommern
- District: Vorpommern-Greifswald
- Municipal assoc.: Landhagen
- Subdivisions: 4

Government
  - Mayor: Frank Weichbrot

Area
  - Total: 23.09 km^{2} (8.92 sq mi)
- Elevation: 0 m (0 ft)

Population (2025-12-31)
  - Total: 2,300
  - Density: 100/km^{2} (260/sq mi)
- Time zone: UTC+01:00 (CET)
  - Summer (DST): UTC+02:00 (CEST)
- Postal codes: 17498
- Dialling codes: 03834
- Vehicle registration: VG
- Website: www.17498neuenkirchen.de

Neuenkirchen (German pronunciation: [ˈnɔʏənˌkɪʁçn̩]) is a municipality in the Vorpommern-Greifswald district, in Mecklenburg-Vorpommern, Germany.

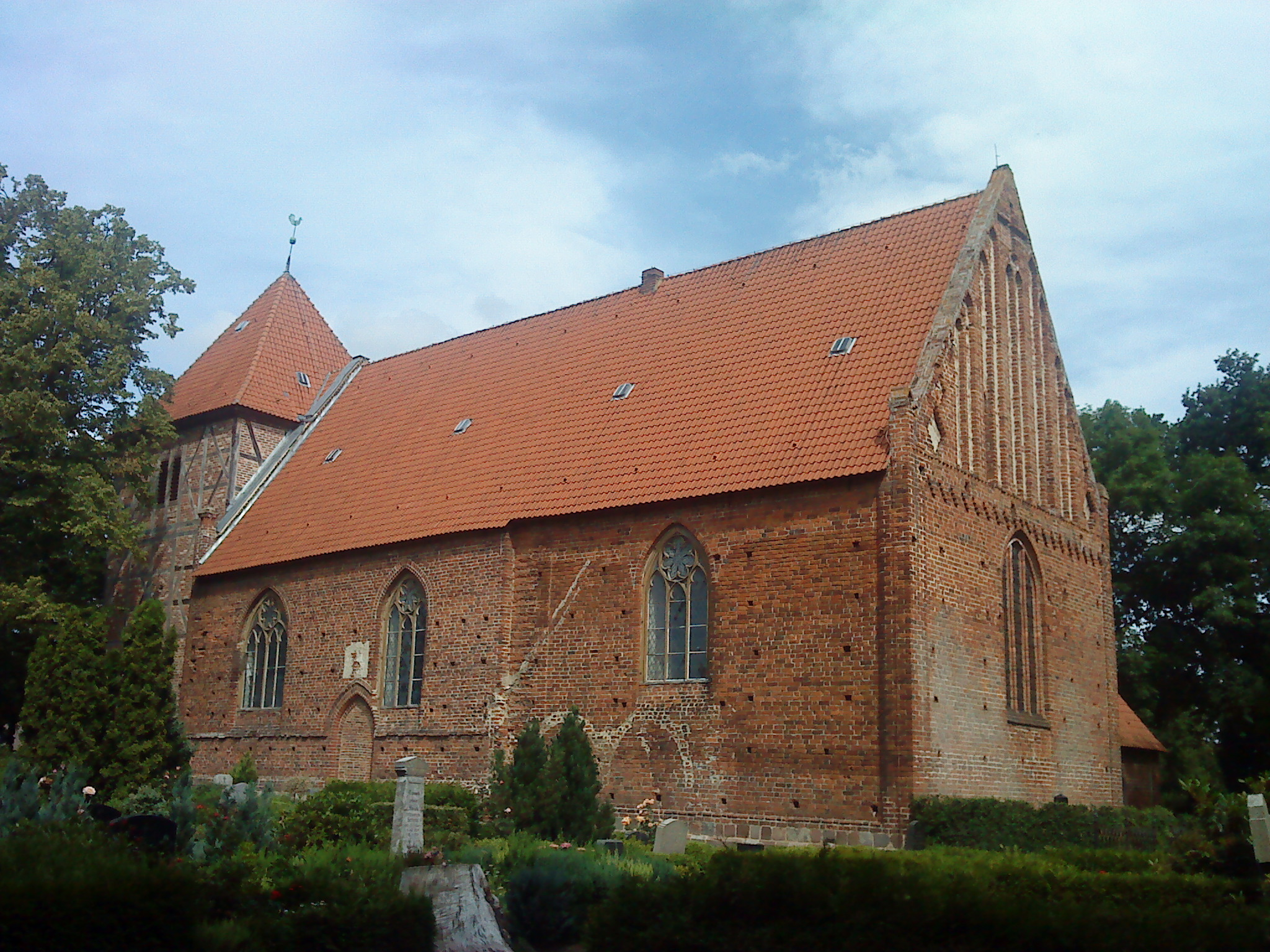
Church

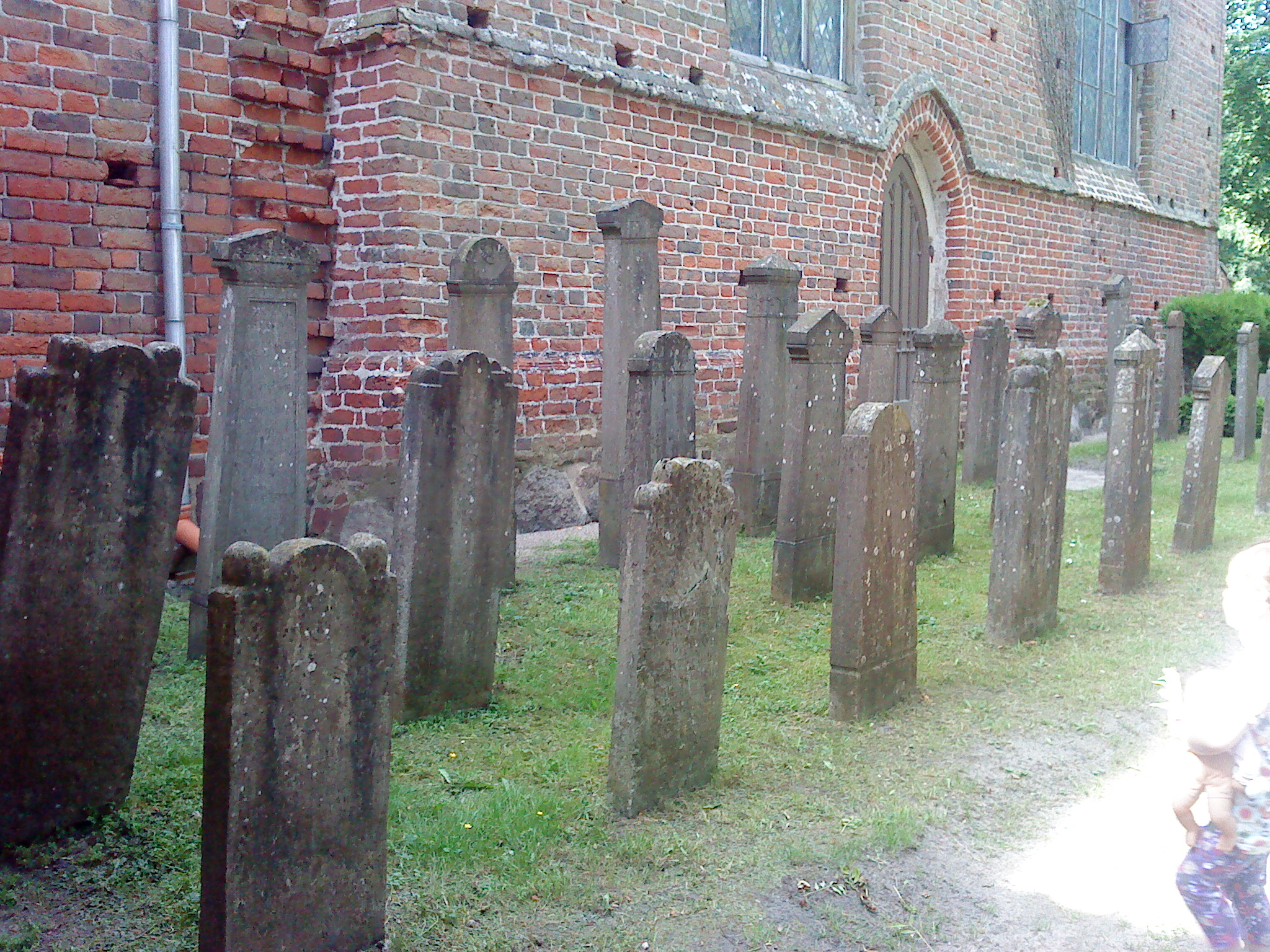
Tombstones at the church
