= Putzar =

- Ortsteil of Boldekow
- Interactive map of Putzar
- Location within Germany Location within Mecklenburg-Vorpommern
- Coordinates: 53°43′N 13°39′E
- Country: Germany
- State: Mecklenburg-Vorpommern
- District: Vorpommern-Greifswald
- Municipality: Boldekow
- Subdivisions: 3

Area
  - Total: 17.43 km^{2} (6.73 sq mi)
- Elevation: 10 m (33 ft)

Population (2010-12-31)
  - Total: 206
  - Density: 11.8/km^{2} (30.6/sq mi)
- Time zone: UTC+01:00 (CET)
  - Summer (DST): UTC+02:00 (CEST)
- Postal codes: 17392
- Dialling codes: 039722
- Vehicle registration: VG (until 2011: OVP)
- Website: www.amt-anklam-land.de

Putzar is a village and a former municipality in the Vorpommern-Greifswald district, in Mecklenburg-Vorpommern, Germany. On 1 January 2012, it became part of the municipality Boldekow.
