= Dargelin =

- Municipality
- Location of Dargelin within Vorpommern-Greifswald district
- Interactive map of Dargelin
- Location within Germany Location within Mecklenburg-Vorpommern
- Coordinates: 54°01′N 13°21′E
- Country: Germany
- State: Mecklenburg-Vorpommern
- District: Vorpommern-Greifswald
- Municipal assoc.: Landhagen
- Subdivisions: 5

Government
  - Mayor: Fred Feike

Area
  - Total: 15.72 km^{2} (6.07 sq mi)
- Elevation: 24 m (79 ft)

Population (2025-12-31)
  - Total: 356
  - Density: 22.6/km^{2} (58.7/sq mi)
- Time zone: UTC+01:00 (CET)
  - Summer (DST): UTC+02:00 (CEST)
- Postal codes: 17498
- Dialling codes: 038356
- Vehicle registration: VG
- Website: www.landhagen.de

Dargelin is a municipality in the Vorpommern-Greifswald district, in Mecklenburg-Vorpommern, Germany.
