= Kölzin =

- Ortsteil of Gützkow
- Interactive map of Kölzin
- Location within Germany Location within Mecklenburg-Vorpommern
- Coordinates: 53°58′N 13°27′E
- Country: Germany
- State: Mecklenburg-Vorpommern
- District: Vorpommern-Greifswald
- Town: Gützkow

Area
  - Total: 14.47 km^{2} (5.59 sq mi)
- Elevation: 24 m (79 ft)

Population (2013-12-31)
  - Total: 52
  - Density: 3.6/km^{2} (9.3/sq mi)
- Time zone: UTC+01:00 (CET)
  - Summer (DST): UTC+02:00 (CEST)
- Postal codes: 17506
- Dialling codes: 038353
- Vehicle registration: VG
- Website: www.amt-zuessow.de

Kölzin is a village and a former municipality in the Vorpommern-Greifswald district, in Mecklenburg-Vorpommern, Germany. Since 25 May 2014, it is part of the town Gützkow.
