= Landhagen =

- Amt
- Location of Landhagen within Vorpommern-Greifswald district
- Interactive map of Landhagen
- Location within Germany Location within Mecklenburg-Vorpommern
- Coordinates: 54°05′N 13°20′E
- Country: Germany
- State: Mecklenburg-Vorpommern
- District: Vorpommern-Greifswald

Government
  - Mayor: Robert Lossau

Area
  - Total: 208.92 km^{2} (80.66 sq mi)

Population (2025-12-31)
  - Total: 10,726
  - Density: 51.340/km^{2} (132.97/sq mi)
- Time zone: UTC+01:00 (CET)
  - Summer (DST): UTC+02:00 (CEST)
- Postal codes: 17498
- Dialling codes: 03834
- Vehicle registration: VG
- Website: www.landhagen.de

Landhagen is an Amt (collective municipality) in the district of Vorpommern-Greifswald, in Mecklenburg-Vorpommern, Germany. The seat of the Amt is in Neuenkirchen.

== History ==
The Amt Landhagen was formed on 3 April 1992 by the association of nine municipalities. The name refers to an earlier administrative unit: in 1938 several municipalities were merged into a larger municipality called Landhagen, which was later dissolved.

On 26 May 2019 the former municipality of Diedrichshagen was incorporated into Weitenhagen.

== Geography ==
The Amt is located in the north of the district of Vorpommern-Greifswald, surrounding the city of Greifswald and bordering the Greifswalder Bodden. It covers an area of approximately 209 km².

== Municipalities ==
The Amt Landhagen consists of the following nine municipalities:

- Behrenhoff
- Dargelin
- Dersekow
- Hinrichshagen
- Levenhagen
- Mesekenhagen
- Neuenkirchen (seat)
- Wackerow
- Weitenhagen
