= Weitenhagen =

- Municipality
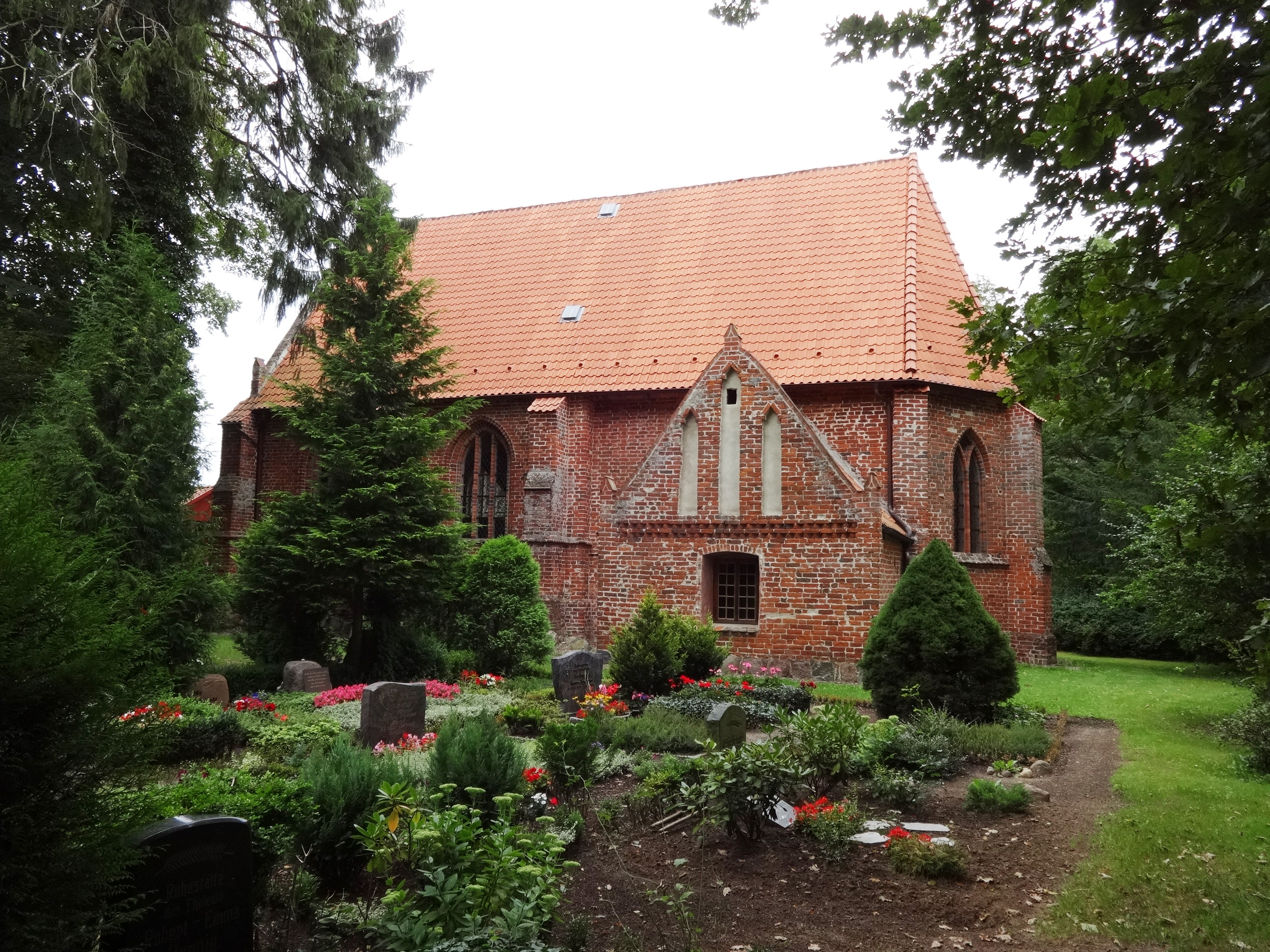
- Village church in Weitenhagen

- Location of Weitenhagen within Vorpommern-Greifswald district
- Interactive map of Weitenhagen
- Location within Germany Location within Mecklenburg-Vorpommern
- Coordinates: 54°03′N 13°25′E
- Country: Germany
- State: Mecklenburg-Vorpommern
- District: Vorpommern-Greifswald
- Municipal assoc.: Landhagen
- Subdivisions: 8

Government
  - Mayor: Janina Jeske

Area
  - Total: 38.30 km^{2} (14.79 sq mi)
- Elevation: 12 m (39 ft)

Population (2025-12-31)
  - Total: 2,155
  - Density: 56.27/km^{2} (145.7/sq mi)
- Time zone: UTC+01:00 (CET)
  - Summer (DST): UTC+02:00 (CEST)
- Postal codes: 17498
- Dialling codes: 03834
- Vehicle registration: VG
- Website: www.amt-landhagen.de

Weitenhagen is a municipality in the Vorpommern-Greifswald district, in Mecklenburg-Western Pomerania, Germany. The former municipality Diedrichshagen was merged into Weitenhagen in May 2019.
