= Neu Kosenow =

- Municipality
- Location of Neu Kosenow within Vorpommern-Greifswald district
- Interactive map of Neu Kosenow
- Location within Germany Location within Mecklenburg-Vorpommern
- Coordinates: 53°48′N 13°45′E
- Country: Germany
- State: Mecklenburg-Vorpommern
- District: Vorpommern-Greifswald
- Municipal assoc.: Anklam-Land
- Subdivisions: 4

Government
  - Mayor: Ulf Brandenburg

Area
  - Total: 24.89 km^{2} (9.61 sq mi)
- Elevation: 2 m (6.6 ft)

Population (2025-12-31)
  - Total: 466
  - Density: 18.7/km^{2} (48.5/sq mi)
- Time zone: UTC+01:00 (CET)
  - Summer (DST): UTC+02:00 (CEST)
- Postal codes: 17398
- Dialling codes: 039726
- Vehicle registration: VG
- Website: www.amt-anklam-land.de

Neu Kosenow is a municipality in the Vorpommern-Greifswald district, in Mecklenburg-Vorpommern, Germany. It has a total area of 24.89 km sq with a population of 470.

== History ==
From 1653 to 1815, Neu Kosenow was part of Swedish Pomerania. From 1815 to 1945, it was part of the Prussian Province of Pomerania, from 1945 to 1952 of the State of Mecklenburg-Vorpommern, from 1952 to 1990 of the Bezirk Neubrandenburg of East Germany and since 1990 again of Mecklenburg-Vorpommern.
