= Hinrichshagen =

- Municipality
- Location of Hinrichshagen within Vorpommern-Greifswald district
- Interactive map of Hinrichshagen
- Location within Germany Location within Mecklenburg-Vorpommern
- Coordinates: 54°05′N 13°20′E
- Country: Germany
- State: Mecklenburg-Vorpommern
- District: Vorpommern-Greifswald
- Municipal assoc.: Landhagen
- Subdivisions: 7

Government
  - Mayor: Marko Diedrich

Area
  - Total: 9.98 km^{2} (3.85 sq mi)
- Elevation: 3 m (9.8 ft)

Population (2025-12-31)
  - Total: 923
  - Density: 92.5/km^{2} (240/sq mi)
- Time zone: UTC+01:00 (CET)
  - Summer (DST): UTC+02:00 (CEST)
- Postal codes: 17498
- Dialling codes: 03834
- Vehicle registration: VG
- Website: www.amt-landhagen.de

Hinrichshagen is a municipality in the Vorpommern-Greifswald district, in Mecklenburg-Vorpommern, Germany.
