= Levenhagen =

- Municipality
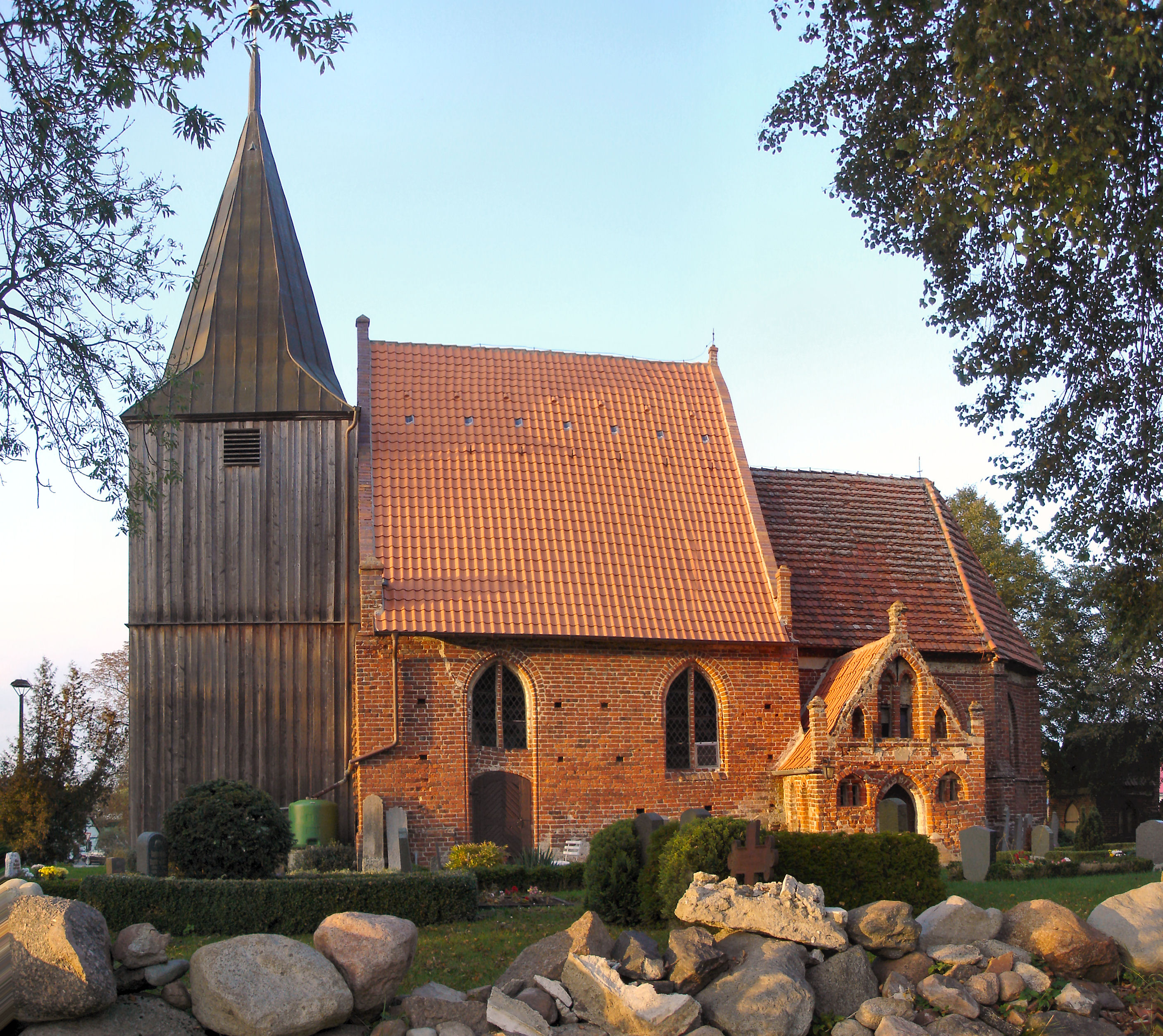
- Medieval village church in Levenhagen≤

- Location of Levenhagen within Vorpommern-Greifswald district
- Interactive map of Levenhagen
- Location within Germany Location within Mecklenburg-Vorpommern
- Coordinates: 54°05′N 13°16′E
- Country: Germany
- State: Mecklenburg-Vorpommern
- District: Vorpommern-Greifswald
- Municipal assoc.: Landhagen
- Subdivisions: 4

Government
  - Mayor: Gerhard Schulz

Area
  - Total: 13.18 km^{2} (5.09 sq mi)
- Elevation: 3 m (9.8 ft)

Population (2025-12-31)
  - Total: 404
  - Density: 30.7/km^{2} (79.4/sq mi)
- Time zone: UTC+01:00 (CET)
  - Summer (DST): UTC+02:00 (CEST)
- Postal codes: 17498
- Dialling codes: 03834
- Vehicle registration: VG
- Website: Amt Landhagen

Levenhagen is a municipality in the Vorpommern-Greifswald district, in Mecklenburg-Vorpommern, Germany.
