= Krusenfelde =

- Municipality
- Location of Krusenfelde within Vorpommern-Greifswald district
- Interactive map of Krusenfelde
- Location within Germany Location within Mecklenburg-Vorpommern
- Coordinates: 53°51′N 13°24′E
- Country: Germany
- State: Mecklenburg-Vorpommern
- District: Vorpommern-Greifswald
- Municipal assoc.: Anklam-Land
- Subdivisions: 3

Government
  - Mayor: Rüdiger Berndt

Area
  - Total: 12.55 km^{2} (4.85 sq mi)
- Elevation: 9 m (30 ft)

Population (2025-12-31)
  - Total: 161
  - Density: 12.8/km^{2} (33.2/sq mi)
- Time zone: UTC+01:00 (CET)
  - Summer (DST): UTC+02:00 (CEST)
- Postal codes: 17391
- Dialling codes: 039723
- Vehicle registration: VG
- Website: www.amt-anklam-land.de

Krusenfelde is a municipality in the Vorpommern-Greifswald district, in Mecklenburg-Vorpommern, Germany.
