= Bargischow =

- Municipality
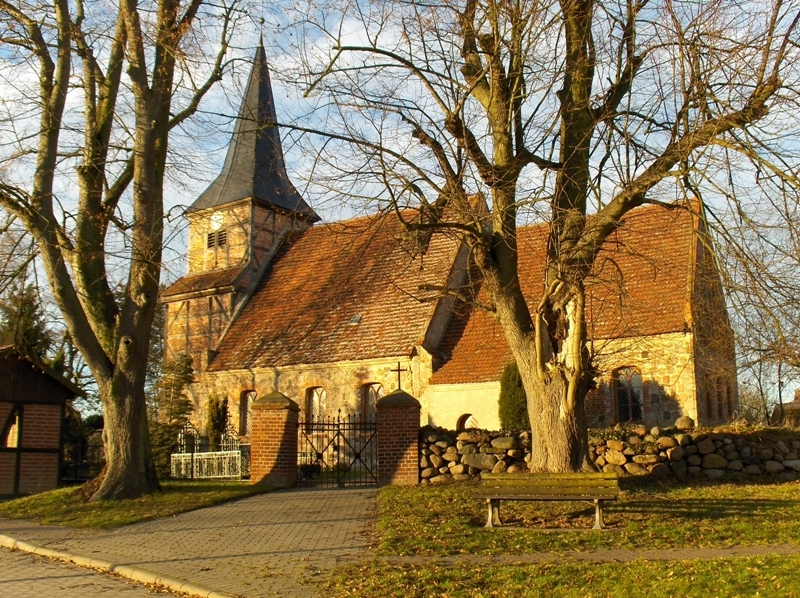
- Medieval village church in Bargischow

- Location of Bargischow within Vorpommern-Greifswald district
- Interactive map of Bargischow
- Location within Germany Location within Mecklenburg-Vorpommern
- Coordinates: 53°50′N 13°45′E
- Country: Germany
- State: Mecklenburg-Vorpommern
- District: Vorpommern-Greifswald
- Municipal assoc.: Anklam-Land
- Subdivisions: 4 Ortsteile

Government
  - Mayor: André Stegemann

Area
  - Total: 21.70 km^{2} (8.38 sq mi)
- Elevation: 4 m (13 ft)

Population (2025-12-31)
  - Total: 302
  - Density: 13.9/km^{2} (36.0/sq mi)
- Time zone: UTC+01:00 (CET)
  - Summer (DST): UTC+02:00 (CEST)
- Postal codes: 17398
- Dialling codes: 03971
- Vehicle registration: VG
- Website: www.amt-anklam-land.de

Bargischow is a municipality in the Vorpommern-Greifswald district, in Mecklenburg-Vorpommern, Germany.

== History ==
From 1648 to 1720, Bargischow was part of Swedish Pomerania. From 1720 to 1945, it was part of the Prussian Province of Pomerania, from 1945 to 1952 of the State of Mecklenburg-Vorpommern, from 1952 to 1990 of the Bezirk Neubrandenburg of East Germany and since 1990 again of Mecklenburg-Vorpommern.

== Location ==
The railway route between Berlin and Stralsund crosses between the municipality and Woserow.

== Geography and transport ==
=== Location ===
The municipality of Bargischow lies about 5 kilometres east of the Hanseatic town of Anklam. To the west the municipality borders immediately on the borough of Anklam. To the north, the Peene, which empties into the Peenestrom, forms the boundary. To the east, the municipality's peninsula of Anklamer Fähre borders on the Stettin Lagoon, which unites with the Peenestrom in the northeast. To the southeast is the Anklamer Torfmoor. The municipality of Bugewitz borders in the southeast on Neu Kosenow and in the south on Bargischow.

=== Transport ===
The Berlin–Stralsund line crosses the municipal area between Bargischow and Woserow, whilst the B 109 federal road passes west of Woserow.
