= Diedrichshagen =

- Ortsteil of Weitenhagen
- Interactive map of Diedrichshagen
- Location within Germany Location within Mecklenburg-Vorpommern
- Coordinates: 54°03′N 13°29′E
- Country: Germany
- State: Mecklenburg-Vorpommern
- District: Vorpommern-Greifswald
- Municipality: Weitenhagen

Area
  - Total: 17.28 km^{2} (6.67 sq mi)
- Elevation: 34 m (112 ft)

Population (2017-12-31)
  - Total: 548
  - Density: 31.7/km^{2} (82.1/sq mi)
- Time zone: UTC+01:00 (CET)
  - Summer (DST): UTC+02:00 (CEST)
- Postal codes: 17498
- Dialling codes: 03834
- Vehicle registration: VG
- Website: www.amt-landhagen.de

Diedrichshagen is a village and a former municipality in the Vorpommern-Greifswald district, in Mecklenburg-Vorpommern, Germany. Since May 2019, it is part of the municipality Weitenhagen.
