= Anklam-Land =

- Amt
- Location of Anklam-Land within Vorpommern-Greifswald district
- Interactive map of Anklam-Land
- Location within Germany Location within Mecklenburg-Vorpommern
- Coordinates: 53°47′N 13°35′E
- Country: Germany
- State: Mecklenburg-Vorpommern
- District: Vorpommern-Greifswald
- Seat: Spantekow
- Subdivisions: 18 municipalities

Area
  - Total: 532.87 km^{2} (205.74 sq mi)

Population (2025-12-31)
  - Total: 9,069
  - Density: 17.02/km^{2} (44.08/sq mi)
- Time zone: UTC+01:00 (CET)
  - Summer (DST): UTC+02:00 (CEST)
- Website: www.amtlubmin.de

Anklam-Land is an Amt in the district of Vorpommern-Greifswald, in Mecklenburg-Vorpommern, Germany. The seat of the Amt is in Spantekow.

The Amt Anklam-Land consists of the following municipalities:

1. Bargischow
2. Blesewitz
3. Boldekow
4. Bugewitz
5. Butzow
6. Ducherow
7. Iven
8. Krien
9. Krusenfelde
10. Medow
11. Neetzow-Liepen
12. Neu Kosenow
13. Neuenkirchen
14. Postlow
15. Rossin
16. Sarnow
17. Spantekow
18. Stolpe
