= Behrenhoff =

- Municipality
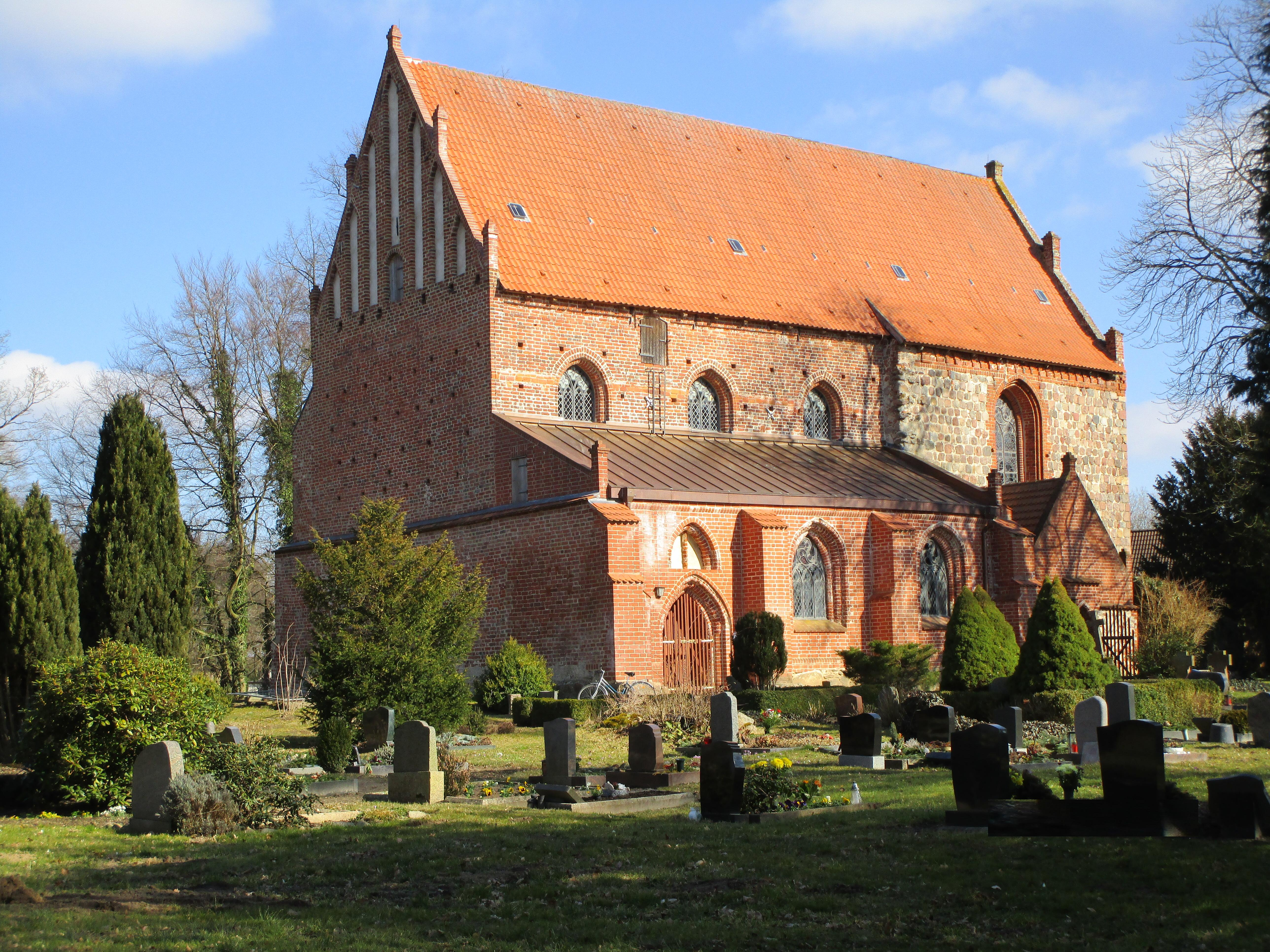
- Medieval village church in Behrenhoff

- Location of Behrenhoff within Vorpommern-Greifswald district
- Interactive map of Behrenhoff
- Location within Germany Location within Mecklenburg-Vorpommern
- Coordinates: 54°01′N 13°24′E
- Country: Germany
- State: Mecklenburg-Vorpommern
- District: Vorpommern-Greifswald
- Municipal assoc.: Landhagen
- Subdivisions: 7 Ortsteile

Government
  - Mayor: Markus Clausen

Area
  - Total: 24.37 km^{2} (9.41 sq mi)
- Elevation: 25 m (82 ft)

Population (2025-12-31)
  - Total: 866
  - Density: 35.5/km^{2} (92.0/sq mi)
- Time zone: UTC+01:00 (CET)
  - Summer (DST): UTC+02:00 (CEST)
- Postal codes: 17498
- Dialling codes: 038356
- Vehicle registration: VG
- Website: www.landhagen.de

Behrenhoff is a municipality in the Vorpommern-Greifswald district, in Mecklenburg-Vorpommern, Germany.
