= Karlsburg, Mecklenburg-Vorpommern =

Karlsburg
- Municipality
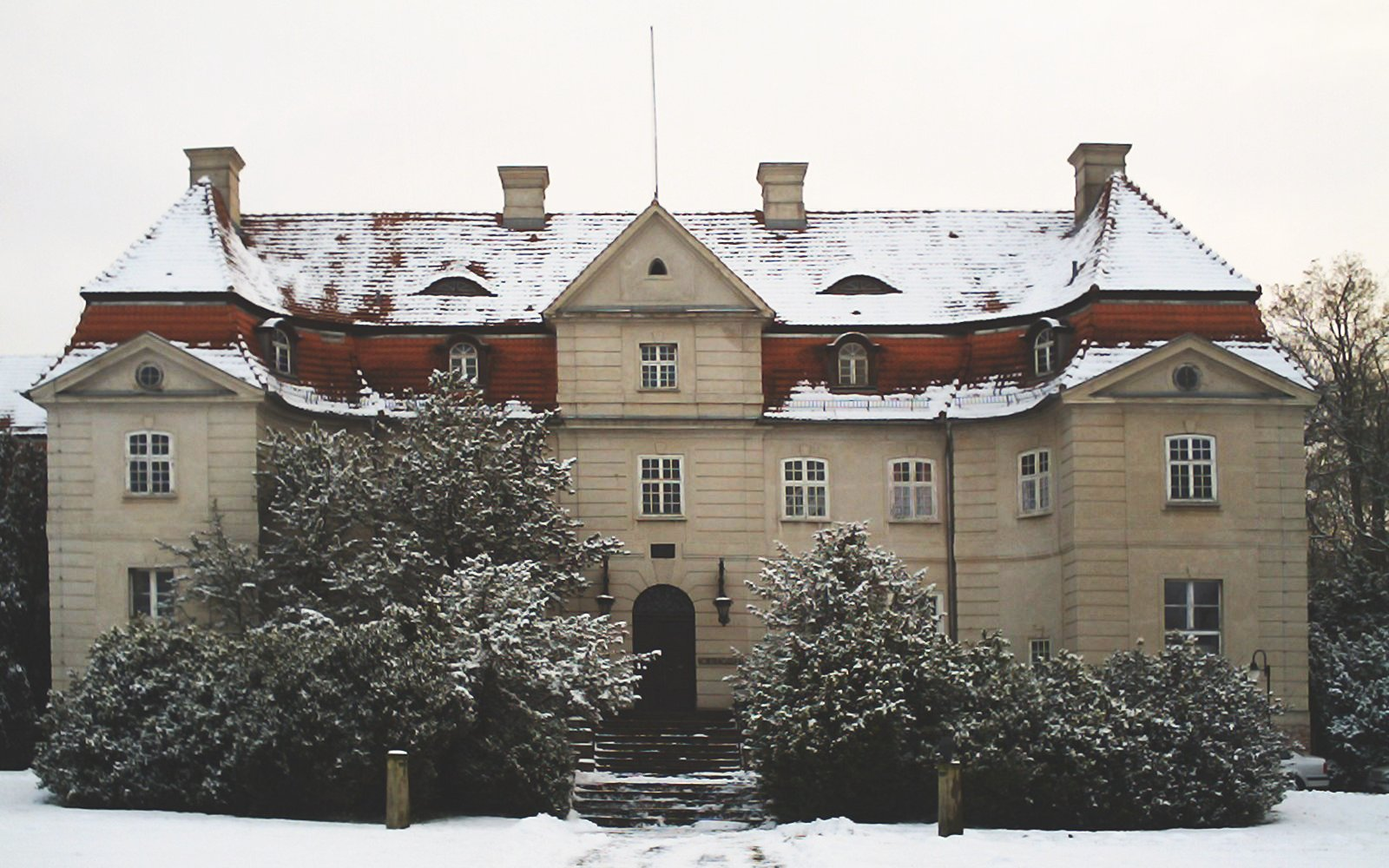
- Karlsburg Castle

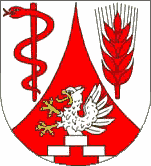
- Coat of arms

- Location of Karlsburg within Vorpommern-Greifswald district
- Interactive map of Karlsburg
- Location within Germany Location within Mecklenburg-Vorpommern
- Coordinates: 53°58′N 13°37′E
- Country: Germany
- State: Mecklenburg-Vorpommern
- District: Vorpommern-Greifswald
- Municipal assoc.: Züssow
- Subdivisions: 8

Government
  - Mayor: Mathias Bartoszewski

Area
  - Total: 34.23 km^{2} (13.22 sq mi)
- Elevation: 22 m (72 ft)

Population (2025-12-31)
  - Total: 1,741
  - Density: 50.86/km^{2} (131.7/sq mi)
- Time zone: UTC+01:00 (CET)
  - Summer (DST): UTC+02:00 (CEST)
- Postal codes: 17495
- Dialling codes: 038355
- Vehicle registration: VG
- Website: https://www.karlsburg-mv.de/

Karlsburg is a municipality in the Vorpommern-Greifswald district, in Mecklenburg-Vorpommern, Germany. The former municipality Lühmannsdorf was merged into Karlsburg in May 2019.

The original name of the place was Gnatzkow. In 1771 King Gustav III of Sweden, then imperially enfeoffed with Swedish Pomerania, renamed the place into Karlsburg after the first name of Carl Heinrich Behrend, Count von Bohlen (1705–1757), who had built the new manor house between 1731 and 1739. In 1745 Carl Heinrich Behrend von Bohlen was raised to the rank of imperial count. Through the marriage of Caroline, Countess von Bohlen, with Theodor Alexander von Bismarck of the Schönhausen branch of the House of Bismarck, Karlsburg Castle was inherited by this family. Theodor Alexander was made a count by King Frederick William III of Prussia in 1818. In 1945, the estate was expropriated following the communist power seizure in the Soviet occupation zone of Germany. It has become a hospital since.
