= Bugewitz =

- Municipality
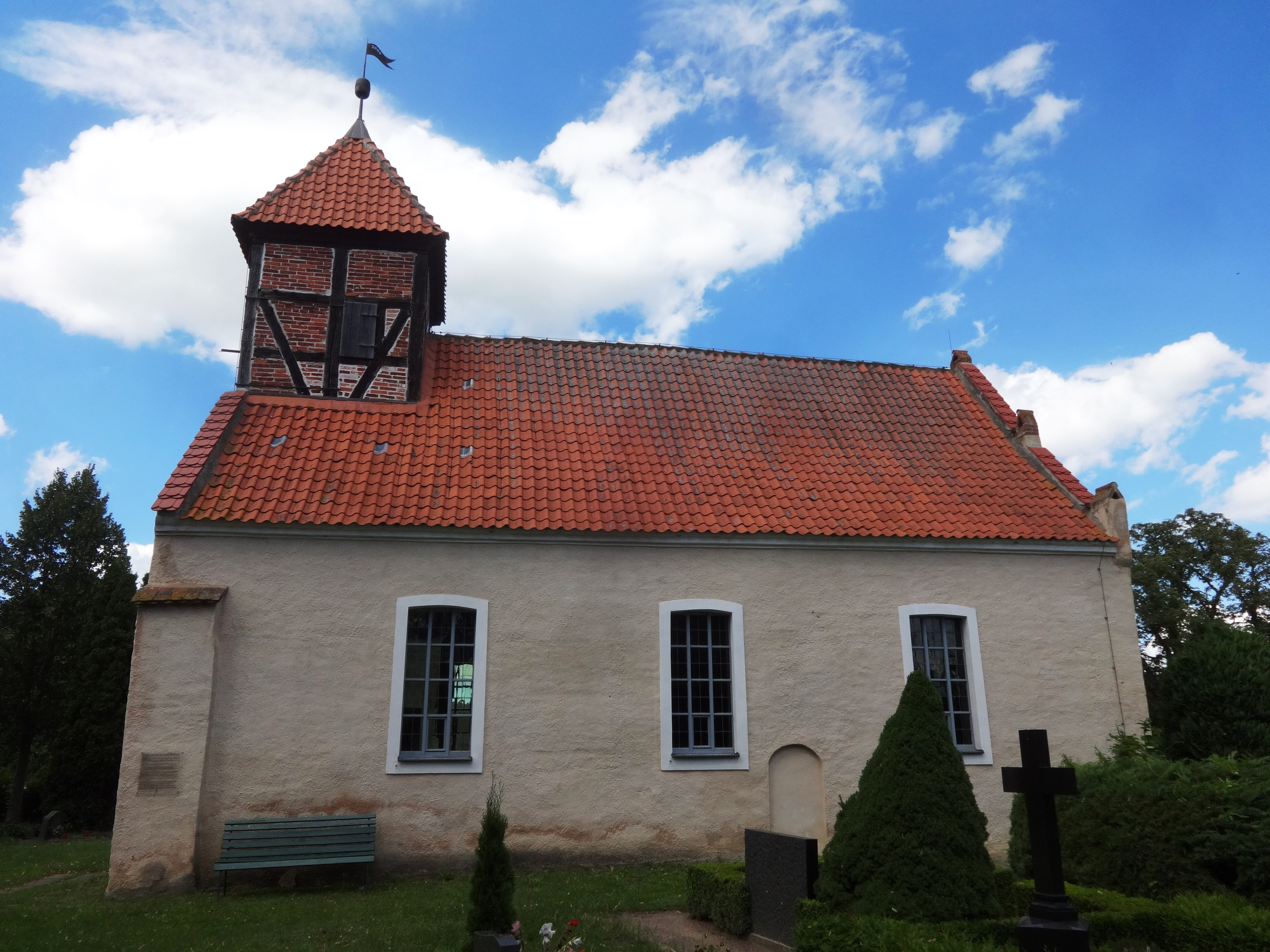
- Church in Bugewitz

- Location of Bugewitz within Vorpommern-Greifswald district
- Interactive map of Bugewitz
- Location within Germany Location within Mecklenburg-Vorpommern
- Coordinates: 53°48′N 13°50′E
- Country: Germany
- State: Mecklenburg-Vorpommern
- District: Vorpommern-Greifswald
- Municipal assoc.: Anklam-Land
- Subdivisions: 5

Government
  - Mayor: Ruth Schiller

Area
  - Total: 56.77 km^{2} (21.92 sq mi)
- Elevation: 1 m (3.3 ft)

Population (2025-12-31)
  - Total: 231
  - Density: 4.07/km^{2} (10.5/sq mi)
- Time zone: UTC+01:00 (CET)
  - Summer (DST): UTC+02:00 (CEST)
- Postal codes: 17398
- Dialling codes: 039726
- Vehicle registration: VG
- Website: www.amt-anklam-land.de

Bugewitz is a municipality in the Vorpommern-Greifswald district, in Mecklenburg-Vorpommern in north-eastern Germany. It is the least densely populated municipality in what was East Germany, and the fifth-least densely populated in all of Germany. All four municipalities of lesser population density (Wiedenborstel, Büttel, Gröde, and Fredeburg) are located in Schleswig-Holstein.

== History ==
The name of the settlement was recorded as Bucoseviz, in 1233; and as Bugheuiz, in 1288.

From 1648 to 1720, Bugewitz was part of Swedish Pomerania. From 1720 to 1945, it was part of the Prussian Province of Pomerania, from 1945 to 1952 of the State of Mecklenburg-Vorpommern, from 1952 to 1990 of the Bezirk Neubrandenburg of East Germany and since 1990 again of Mecklenburg-Vorpommern.

== Sights ==
- Karnin Lift Bridge
- Szczecin Lagoon
- Anklamer Torfmoor
- Bugewitz Church
- Ferry port and Kamp Marina with nearby mainland link, the Karnin Lift Bridge
- Bugewitz Barrow
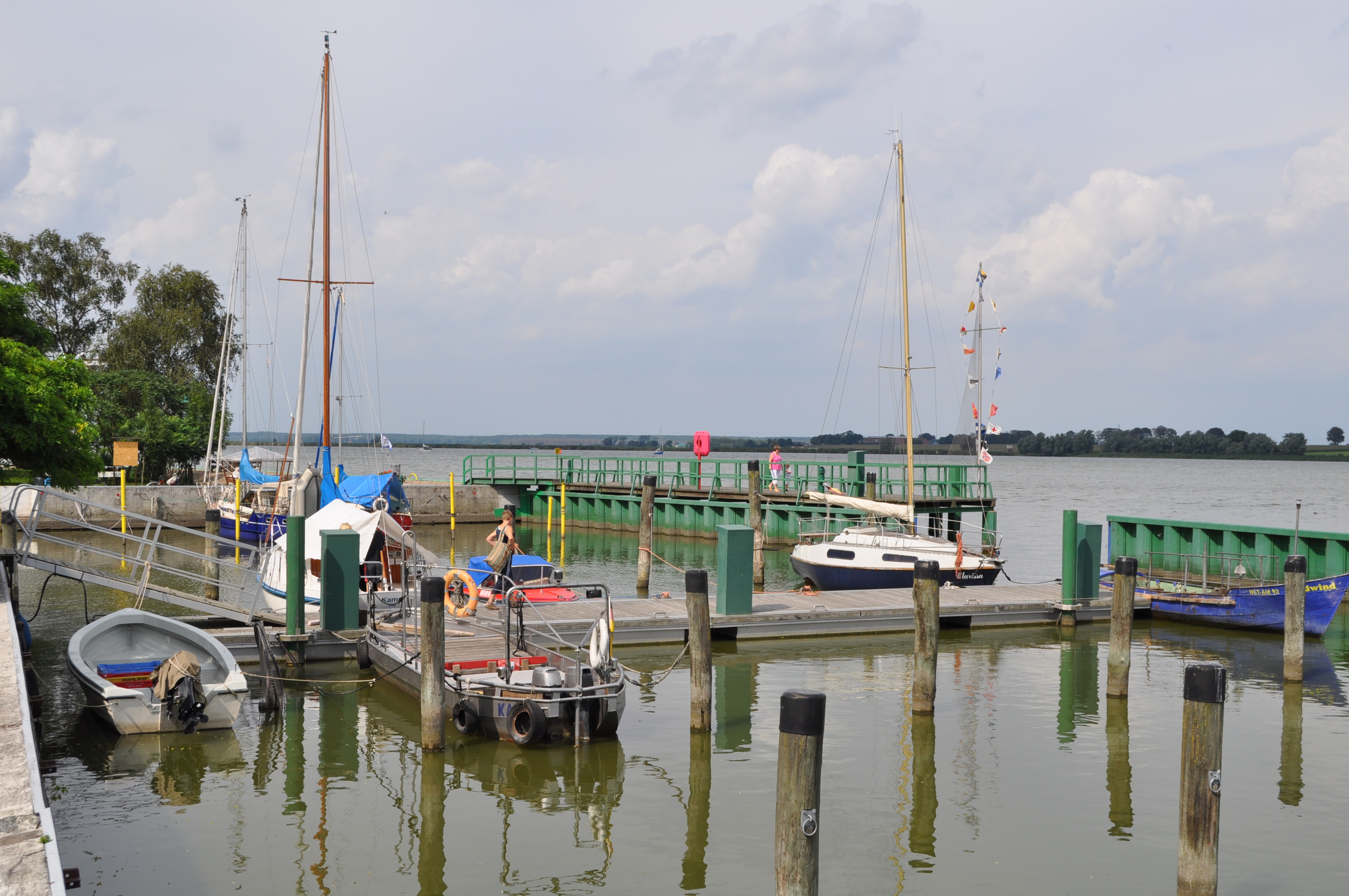
Ferry port and Kamp Marina

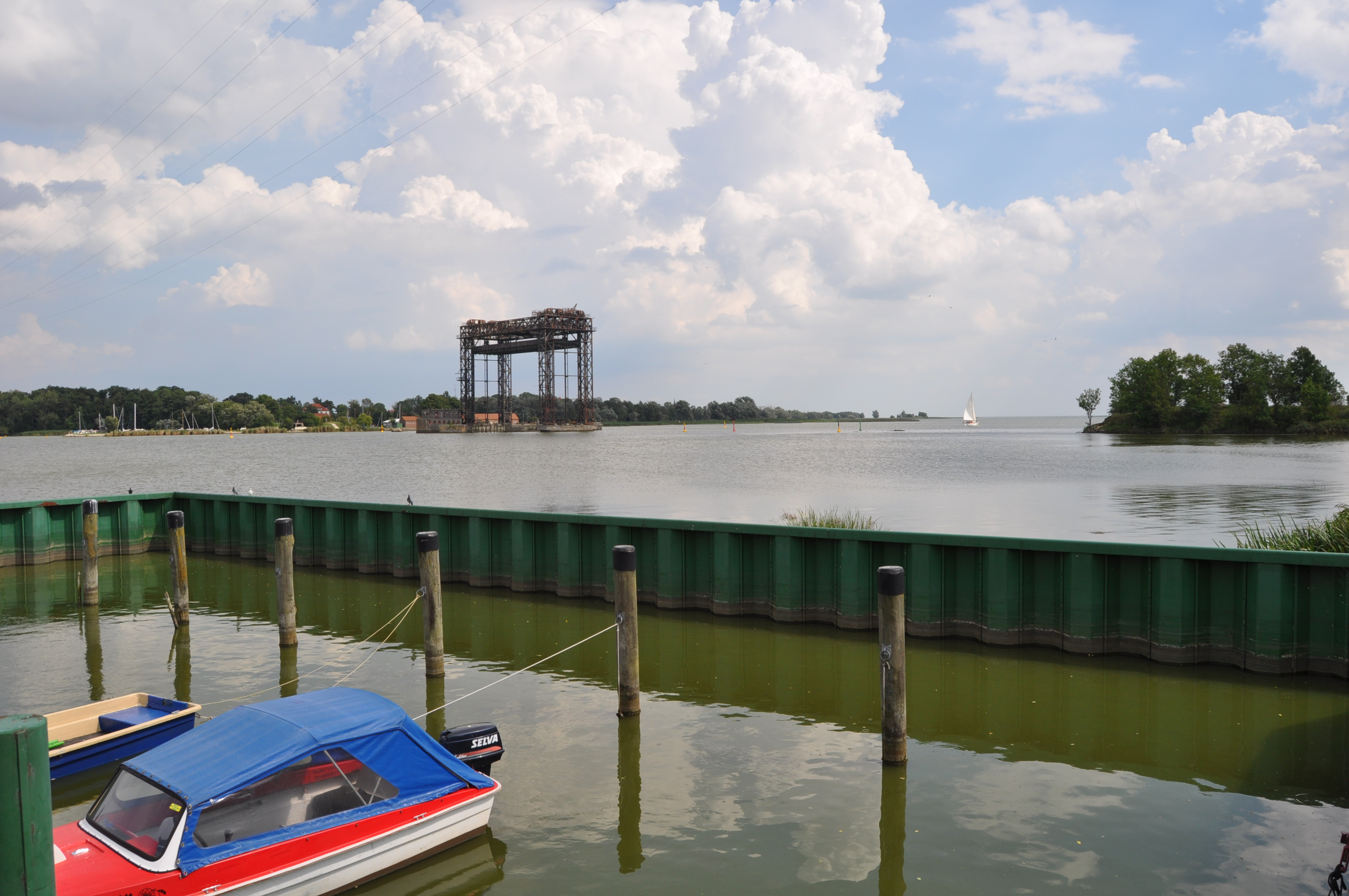
The Karnin Lift Bridge on the mainland - right, near Kamp

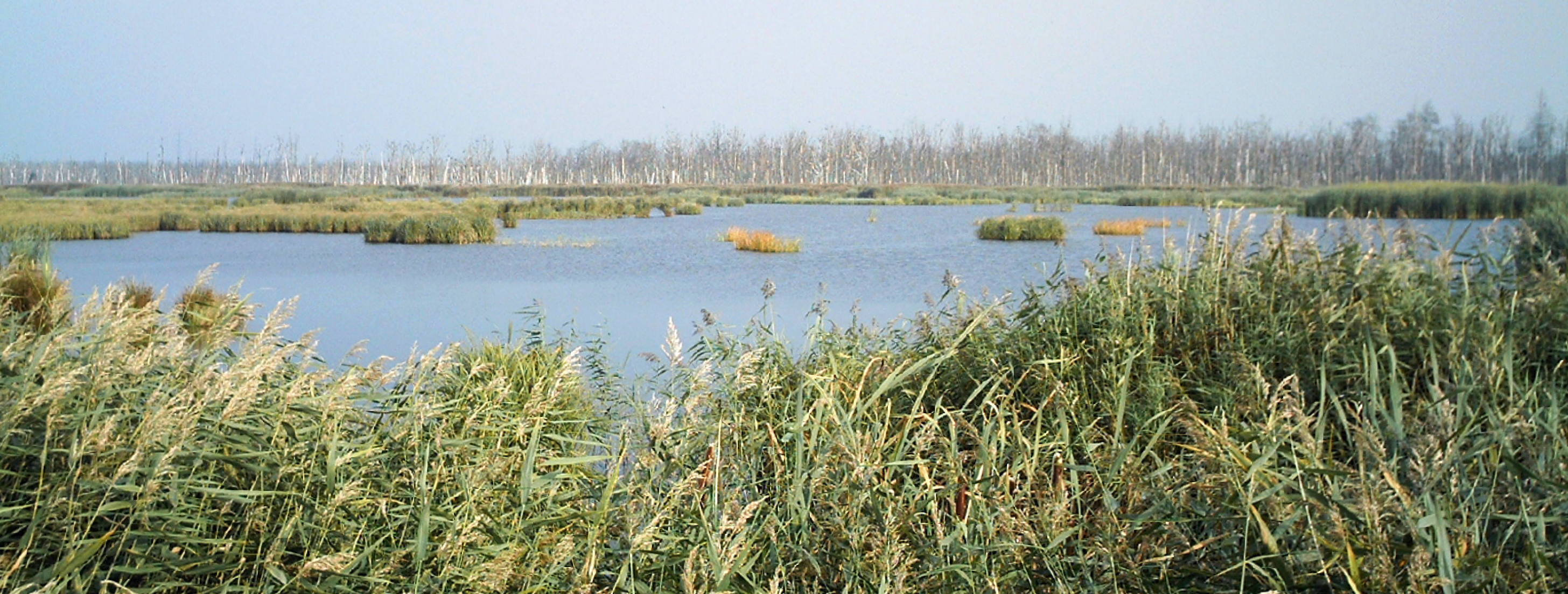
The Anklamer Torfmoor near Rosenhagen
