= Lühmannsdorf =

- Ortsteil of Karlsburg
- Coat of arms
- Interactive map of Lühmannsdorf
- Location within Germany Location within Mecklenburg-Vorpommern
- Coordinates: 54°0′N 13°38′E
- Country: Germany
- State: Mecklenburg-Vorpommern
- District: Vorpommern-Greifswald
- Municipality: Karlsburg
- Subdivisions: 4

Area
  - Total: 5.65 km^{2} (2.18 sq mi)
- Elevation: 39 m (128 ft)

Population (2017-12-31)
  - Total: 679
  - Density: 120/km^{2} (311/sq mi)
- Time zone: UTC+01:00 (CET)
  - Summer (DST): UTC+02:00 (CEST)
- Postal codes: 17495
- Dialling codes: 038355
- Vehicle registration: VG
- Website: www.amt-zuessow.de

Lühmannsdorf is a village and a former municipality in the Vorpommern-Greifswald district, in Mecklenburg-Vorpommern, Germany. Since May 2019, it is part of the municipality Karlsburg. The municipality Lühmannsdorf consisted of the villages:

- Brüssow
- Giesekenhagen
- Jagdkrug
- Lühmannsdorf
