= Japenzin =

- Ortsteil of Spantekow
- Interactive map of Japenzin
- Location within Germany Location within Mecklenburg-Vorpommern
- Coordinates: 53°46′N 13°27′E
- Country: Germany
- State: Mecklenburg-Vorpommern
- District: Vorpommern-Greifswald
- Municipality: Spantekow

Area
  - Total: 12.71 km^{2} (4.91 sq mi)
- Elevation: 21 m (69 ft)

Population (2006-12-31)
  - Total: 217
  - Density: 17.1/km^{2} (44.2/sq mi)
- Time zone: UTC+01:00 (CET)
  - Summer (DST): UTC+02:00 (CEST)
- Postal codes: 17392
- Dialling codes: 039727
- Vehicle registration: OVP
- Website: www.amt-anklam-land.de

Japenzin is a village and a former municipality in the Vorpommern-Greifswald district, in Mecklenburg-Vorpommern, Germany. Since 7 June 2009, it is part of the municipality Spantekow.
