= Kerstin Thurow =

German engineer

Kerstin Thurow (born October 3, 1969, in Rostock) is a German engineer specializing in automation technology. She has been Professor of Automation/Life Science Automation at the Faculty of Computer Science and Electrical Engineering at the University of Rostock since 1999.

== Life ==
Thurow obtained her Abitur in 1988, matriculating to the University of Rostock to study chemistry. In 1992, she entered LMU Munich for her doctoral degree in chemistry and pharmacy, completing her initial doctorate in 1994 (Promotion). She returned to the University of Rostock, where she was employed as a research assistant in the Department of Electrical Engineering until 1997 and as managing director of the Institute for Measuring and Sensor Systems from 1997 to 1999.

In 1999, Thurow completed her habilitation in engineering sciences, aged 29, and was appointed to Germany's first chair for laboratory automation, still at the University of Rostock. Since 2000, she has been director of the Institute for Automation Technology at the University of Rostock. She was promoted to full professor in 2004.

== Prizes and awards ==
- Member acatech, 2005
- Entrepreneur of the Year, Entrepreneur Prize of the Hanseatic City of Rostock, 2005
- Joachim Jungius Award of the Joachim Jungius Society of Sciences Hamburg, 2004
- Founding member of the Academy of Sciences in Hamburg, 2004
