= Iven =

- Municipality
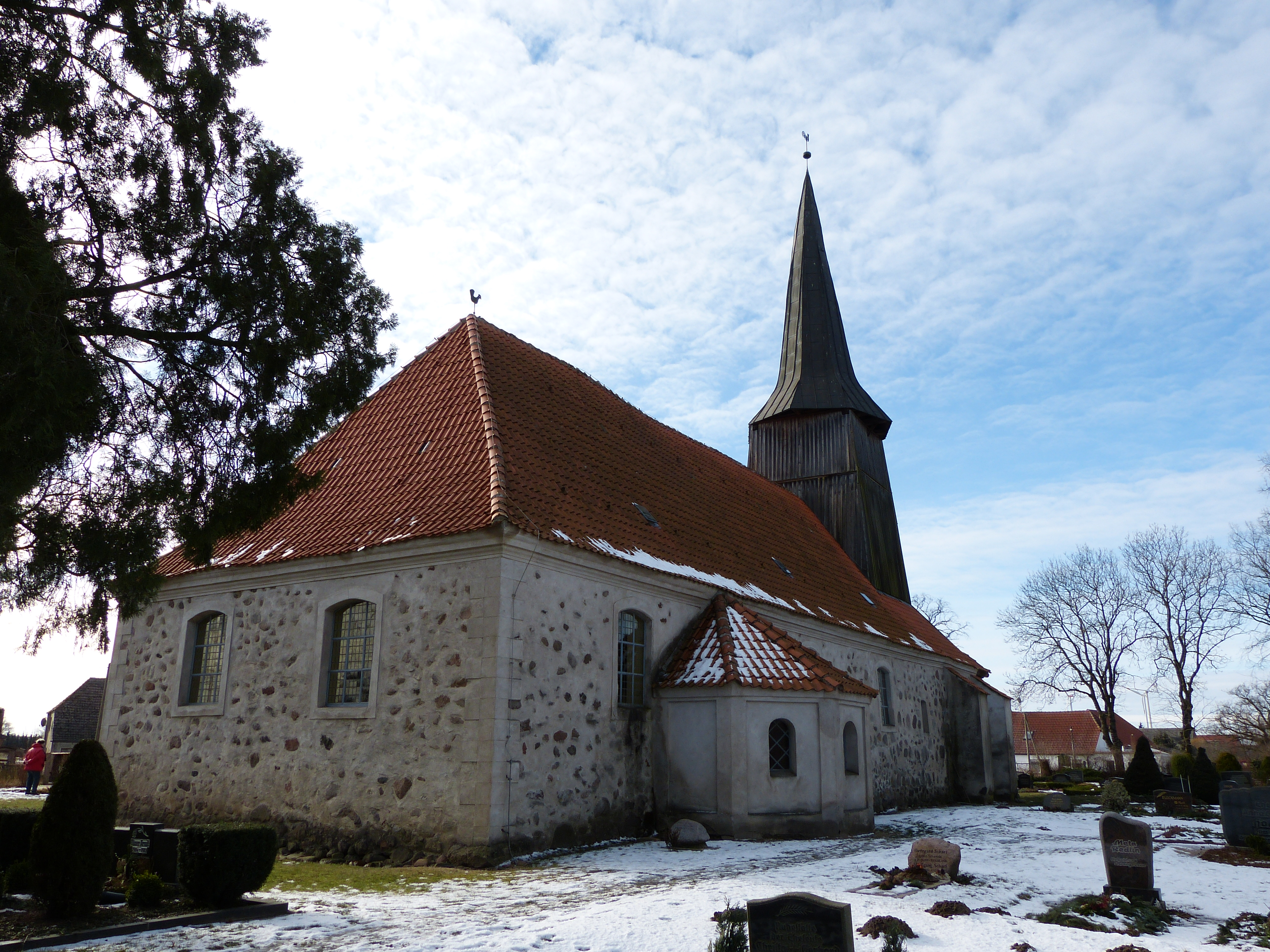
- Medieval village church in Iven

- Location of Iven within Vorpommern-Greifswald district
- Interactive map of Iven
- Location within Germany Location within Mecklenburg-Vorpommern
- Coordinates: 53°48′N 13°26′E
- Country: Germany
- State: Mecklenburg-Vorpommern
- District: Vorpommern-Greifswald
- Municipal assoc.: Anklam-Land

Government
  - Mayor: Uwe Fuhrholz

Area
  - Total: 15.76 km^{2} (6.08 sq mi)
- Elevation: 14 m (46 ft)

Population (2025-12-31)
  - Total: 181
  - Density: 11.5/km^{2} (29.7/sq mi)
- Time zone: UTC+01:00 (CET)
  - Summer (DST): UTC+02:00 (CEST)
- Postal codes: 17391
- Dialling codes: 039723
- Vehicle registration: VG
- Website: www.amt-anklam-land.de

Iven is a municipality in the Vorpommern-Greifswald district, in Mecklenburg-Vorpommern, Germany.

== Notable residents ==
- Georg Detlev von Flemming (1699–1771), Saxon-Polish general
