= Postlow =

- Municipality
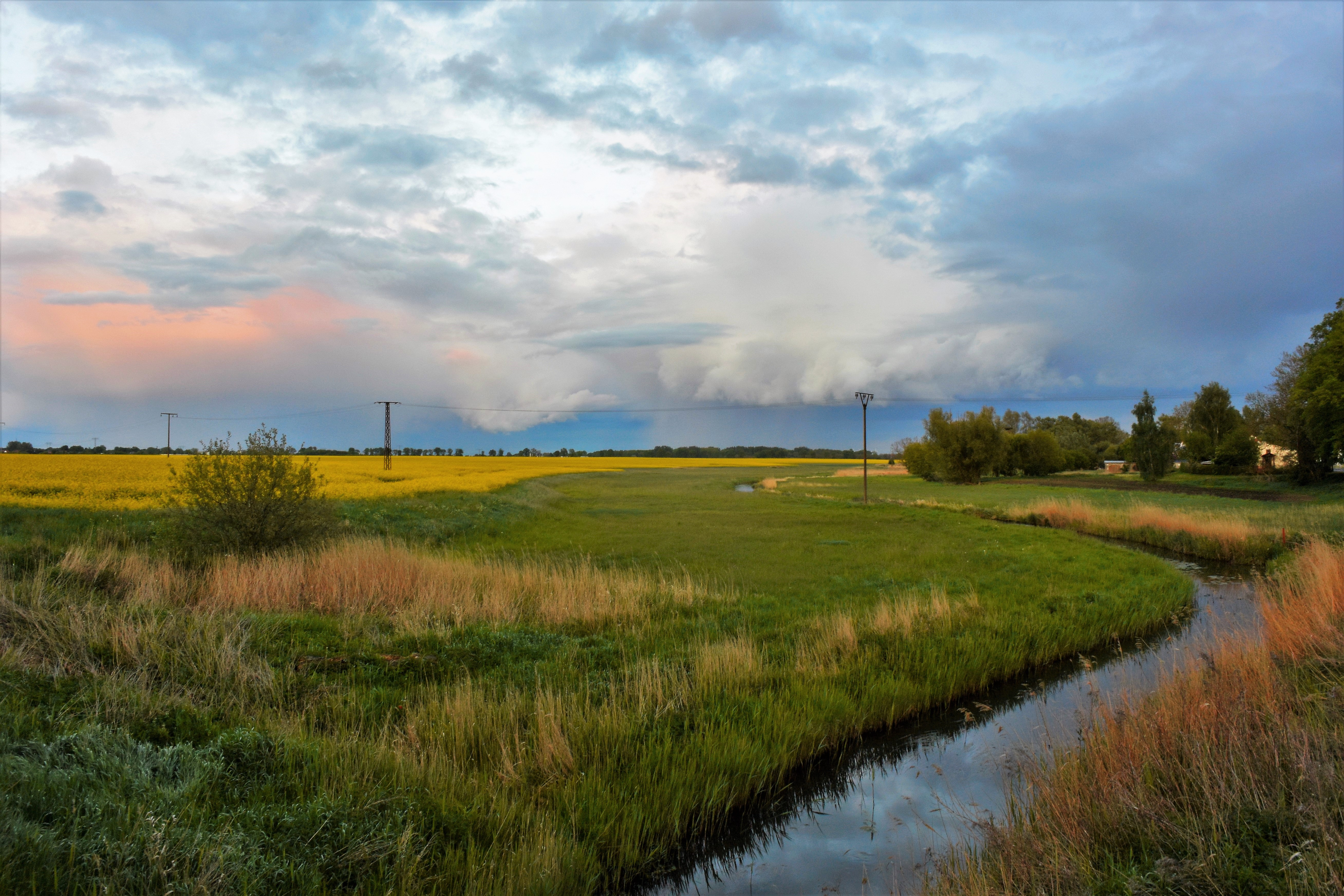

- Location of Postlow within Vorpommern-Greifswald district
- Interactive map of Postlow
- Location within Germany Location within Mecklenburg-Vorpommern
- Coordinates: 53°50′N 13°35′E
- Country: Germany
- State: Mecklenburg-Vorpommern
- District: Vorpommern-Greifswald
- Municipal assoc.: Anklam-Land
- Subdivisions: 3

Government
  - Mayor: Norbert Mielke

Area
  - Total: 14.71 km^{2} (5.68 sq mi)
- Elevation: 9 m (30 ft)

Population (2025-12-31)
  - Total: 300
  - Density: 20/km^{2} (53/sq mi)
- Time zone: UTC+01:00 (CET)
  - Summer (DST): UTC+02:00 (CEST)
- Postal codes: 17391
- Dialling codes: 03971, 039728
- Vehicle registration: VG

Postlow is a municipality in the Vorpommern-Greifswald district, in Mecklenburg-Vorpommern, in north-eastern Germany.

== History ==
From 1648 to 1720, Postlow was part of Swedish Pomerania. In 1720, it passed to Prussia, and from 1871 was also part of the German Empire, within which it was administratively located in the Province of Pomerania. During World War II, in February 1945, a German-perpetrated death march of Allied prisoners-of-war from the Stalag XX-B POW camp passed through the village. From 1945 to 1952 of the State of Mecklenburg-Vorpommern, from 1952 to 1990 of the Bezirk Neubrandenburg of East Germany and since 1990 again of Mecklenburg-Vorpommern.
