= Dersekow =

- Municipality
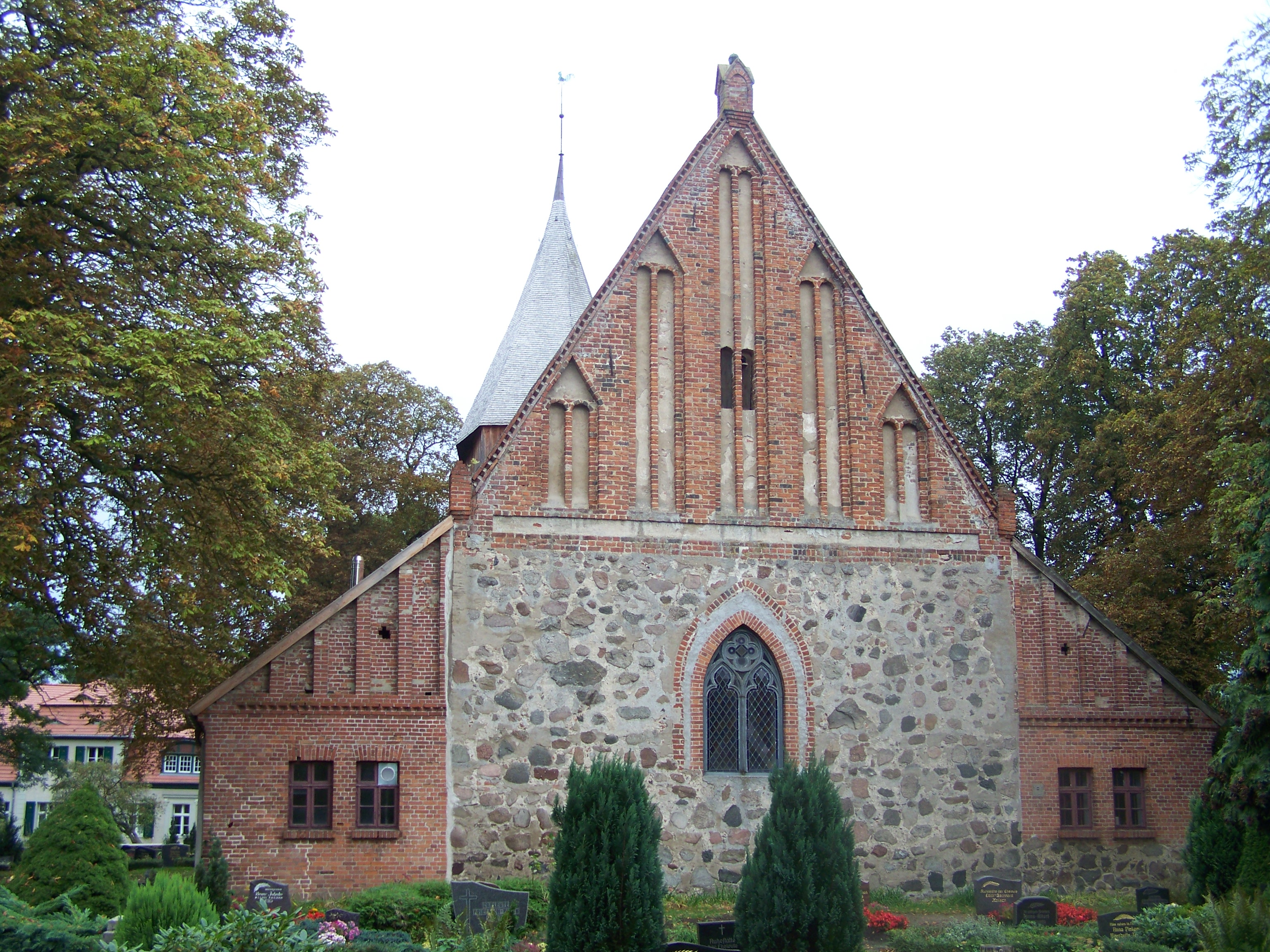
- Medieval village church in Dersekow

- Location of Dersekow within Vorpommern-Greifswald district
- Interactive map of Dersekow
- Location within Germany Location within Mecklenburg-Vorpommern
- Coordinates: 54°03′N 13°18′E
- Country: Germany
- State: Mecklenburg-Vorpommern
- District: Vorpommern-Greifswald
- Municipal assoc.: Landhagen
- Subdivisions: 7

Government
  - Mayor: Dietmar Virgils

Area
  - Total: 26.15 km^{2} (10.10 sq mi)
- Elevation: 24 m (79 ft)

Population (2025-12-31)
  - Total: 1,151
  - Density: 44.02/km^{2} (114.0/sq mi)
- Time zone: UTC+01:00 (CET)
  - Summer (DST): UTC+02:00 (CEST)
- Postal codes: 17498
- Dialling codes: 03834
- Vehicle registration: VG
- Website: www.landhagen.de

Dersekow is a municipality in the Vorpommern-Greifswald district, in Mecklenburg-Vorpommern, Germany.
