= Mützelburger Beeke =

River in Germany

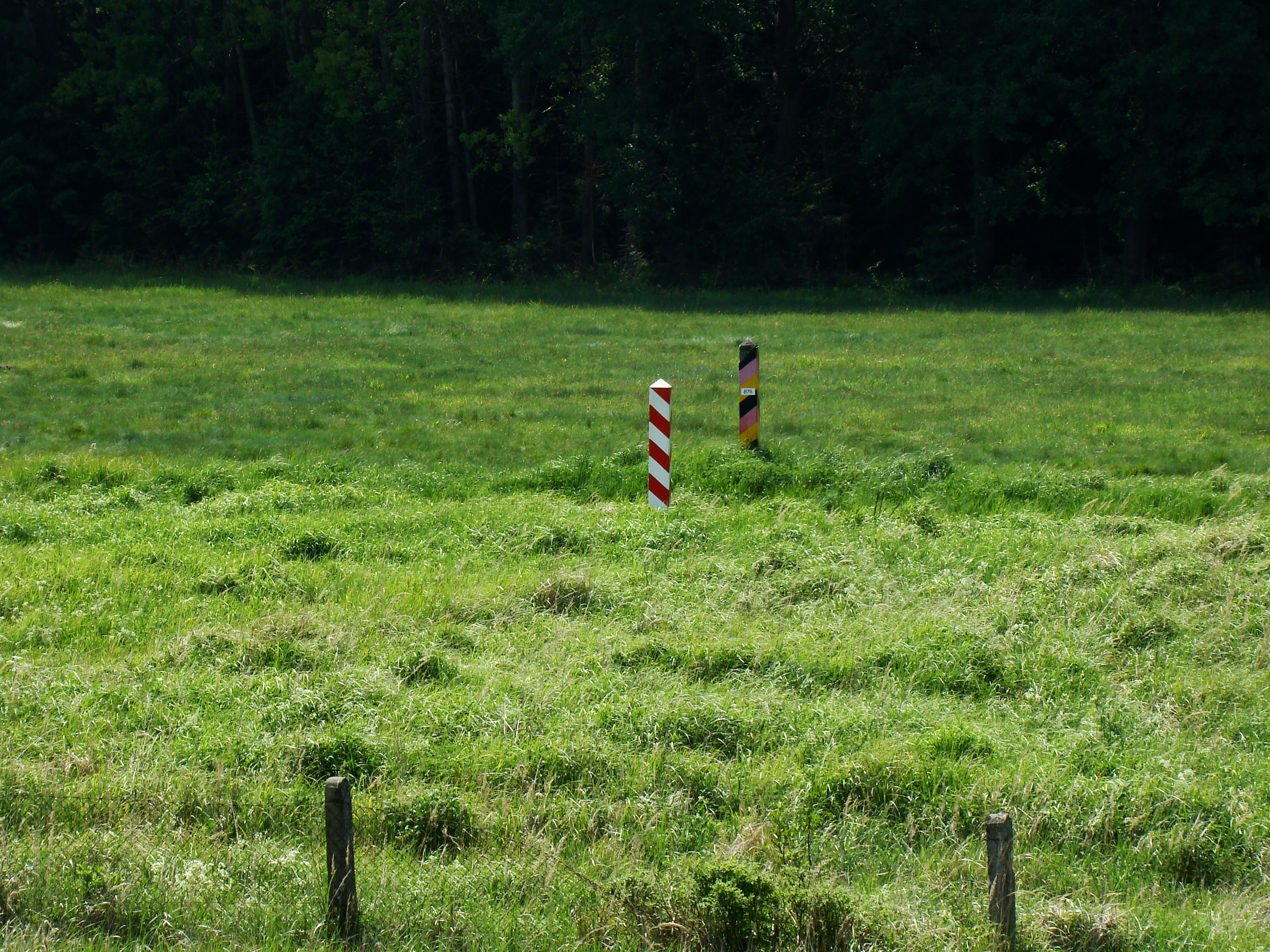

Location
- Countries: Germany and Poland
- States: Mecklenburg-Vorpommern; West Pomeranian Voivodeship

Physical characteristics
- Source
  - location: Großer Mützelburger See
  - coordinates: 53.6590°N 14.2846°E
- Mouth
  - location: Nowe Warpno Lake
  - coordinates: 53.6982°N 14.2674°E
- Length: 6.1 km (3.8 mi)
- Basin size: 21.3 km^{2} (8.2 mi^{2})

The Mützelburger Beeke (Polish: rzeka Myśliborka), often shortened to Beeke, is a 6.1-kilometer-long river. It forms the outflow of the Großer Mützelburger See and flows into the Nowe Warpno Lake, a bay of the Szczecin Lagoon. The Beeke's drainage basin covers approximately 21.3 km^{2}.

The river flows through Myślibórz Mały and east of Rieth, passing through forested areas and wet meadows in Ueckermünde Heath, which can make the banks difficult to access.

As a result of World War II, part of the German-Polish border runs through the middle of the river between the Vorpommern-Greifswald district in Mecklenburg-Vorpommern and Police County in the West Pomeranian Voivodeship.

In the 1960s, extensive land reclamation measures were carried out on both sides of the former border between the German Democratic Republic and the People's Republic of Poland. A weir at the outflow of the Großer Mützelburger See was replaced by a bed slide in 2007/2008, thereby restoring the ecological continuity of the river.

== See also ==
- List of rivers of Mecklenburg-Vorpommern
