= Ahlbeck, Am Stettiner Haff =

Ahlbeck
- Municipality
- Location of Ahlbeck within Vorpommern-Greifswald district
- Interactive map of Ahlbeck
- Location within Germany Location within Mecklenburg-Vorpommern
- Coordinates: 53°40′13″N 14°11′13″E
- Country: Germany
- State: Mecklenburg-Vorpommern
- District: Vorpommern-Greifswald
- Municipal assoc.: Am Stettiner Haff

Government
  - Mayor: Josef Schnellhammer (CDU)

Area
  - Total: 18.66 km^{2} (7.20 sq mi)
- Elevation: 10 m (33 ft)

Population (2025-12-31)
  - Total: 592
  - Density: 31.7/km^{2} (82.2/sq mi)
- Time zone: UTC+01:00 (CET)
  - Summer (DST): UTC+02:00 (CEST)
- Postal codes: 17375
- Dialling codes: 039775
- Vehicle registration: VG
- Website: www.amt-am-stettiner-haff.de

Ahlbeck is a municipality in the Vorpommern-Greifswald district, in Mecklenburg-Vorpommern, Germany.

== History ==
From 1648 to 1720, Ahlbeck was part of Swedish Pomerania. From 1720 to 1945, it was part of the Prussian Province of Pomerania, from 1945 to 1952 of the State of Mecklenburg-Vorpommern, from 1952 to 1990 of the Bezirk Neubrandenburg of East Germany and since 1990 again of Mecklenburg-Vorpommern.

== Geography ==
The municipality of Ahlbeck is located at the eastern part of the Ueckermünde Heath, which is an extensive forest area near the Polish border. With the districts Gegensee and Ludwigshof, Ahlbeck surrounds the northwestern part of a former lake drained by colonists (Ahlbecker See). This wetland, called Seegrund, is a nature reserve about six kilometres long and about two kilometres wide. The Neuwarper See - a bay of the Szczecin Lagoon - is about five kilometres away from Ahlbeck. A military training area of the Bundeswehr takes its place in the southwest of Ahlbeck (Karpin - Spechtberg - Drögeheide). The nearest town is Eggesin and it is eight kilometres away.

== Districts ==
- Gegensee - with some thatched timber-framed houses from the Wilhelmine Period and a holiday settlement (bungalows and huts)
- Ludwigshof (a district since 1912) - including a riding stable and the Ludwigshofer See

== Places of interest ==
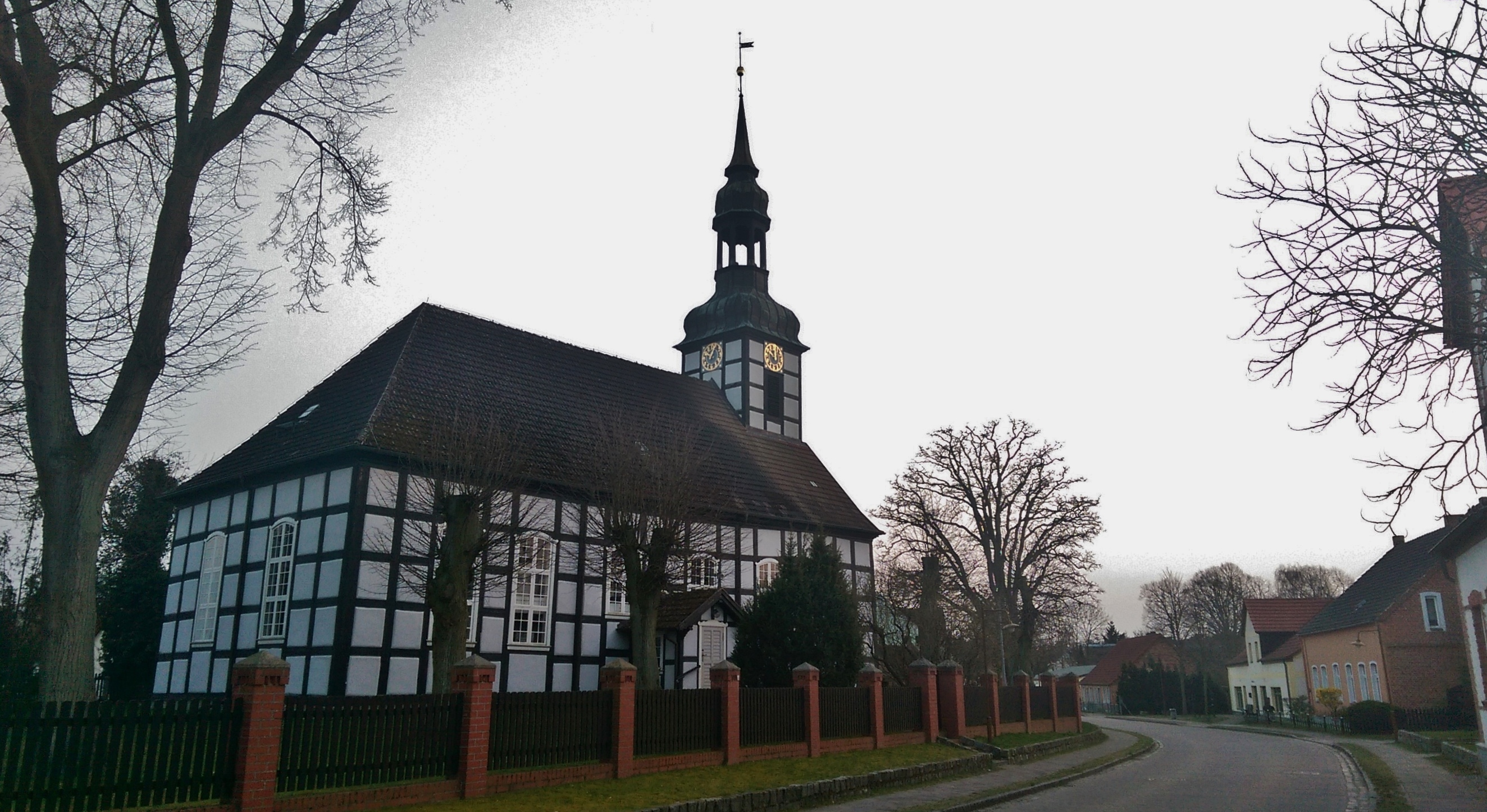
Timber-framed church

- The village church Ahlbeck is a baroque, stately, rectangular timber-framed church from 1759. The tower has an open dome. The furnishings (altar, pulpit, matroneum) dates back to the 18th century. It is one of the finest examples of a timber-framed church in northern Germany.
- The sepulchral chapel of the von Voss family in the cemetery dates from the 2nd half of the 19th century.
- The entire, relatively uniform townscape of the village with its mostly eaves timber-framed houses.
