= Papendorf =

Papendorf may refer to:

- Papendorf (Warnow)
- Papendorf, Uecker-Randow
- Papendorf, the German name for Rubene in Latvia
