= Brünzow =

- Municipality
- Location of Brünzow within Vorpommern-Greifswald district
- Interactive map of Brünzow
- Location within Germany Location within Mecklenburg-Vorpommern
- Coordinates: 54°06′N 13°34′E
- Country: Germany
- State: Mecklenburg-Vorpommern
- District: Vorpommern-Greifswald
- Municipal assoc.: Lubmin
- Subdivisions: 6

Government
  - Mayor: Alfred Bligenthal

Area
  - Total: 16.14 km^{2} (6.23 sq mi)
- Elevation: 5 m (16 ft)

Population (2025-12-31)
  - Total: 692
  - Density: 42.9/km^{2} (111/sq mi)
- Time zone: UTC+01:00 (CET)
  - Summer (DST): UTC+02:00 (CEST)
- Postal codes: 17509
- Dialling codes: 038354
- Vehicle registration: VG
- Website: www.amtlubmin.de

Brünzow is a municipality in the Vorpommern-Greifswald district, in Mecklenburg-Vorpommern, Germany.

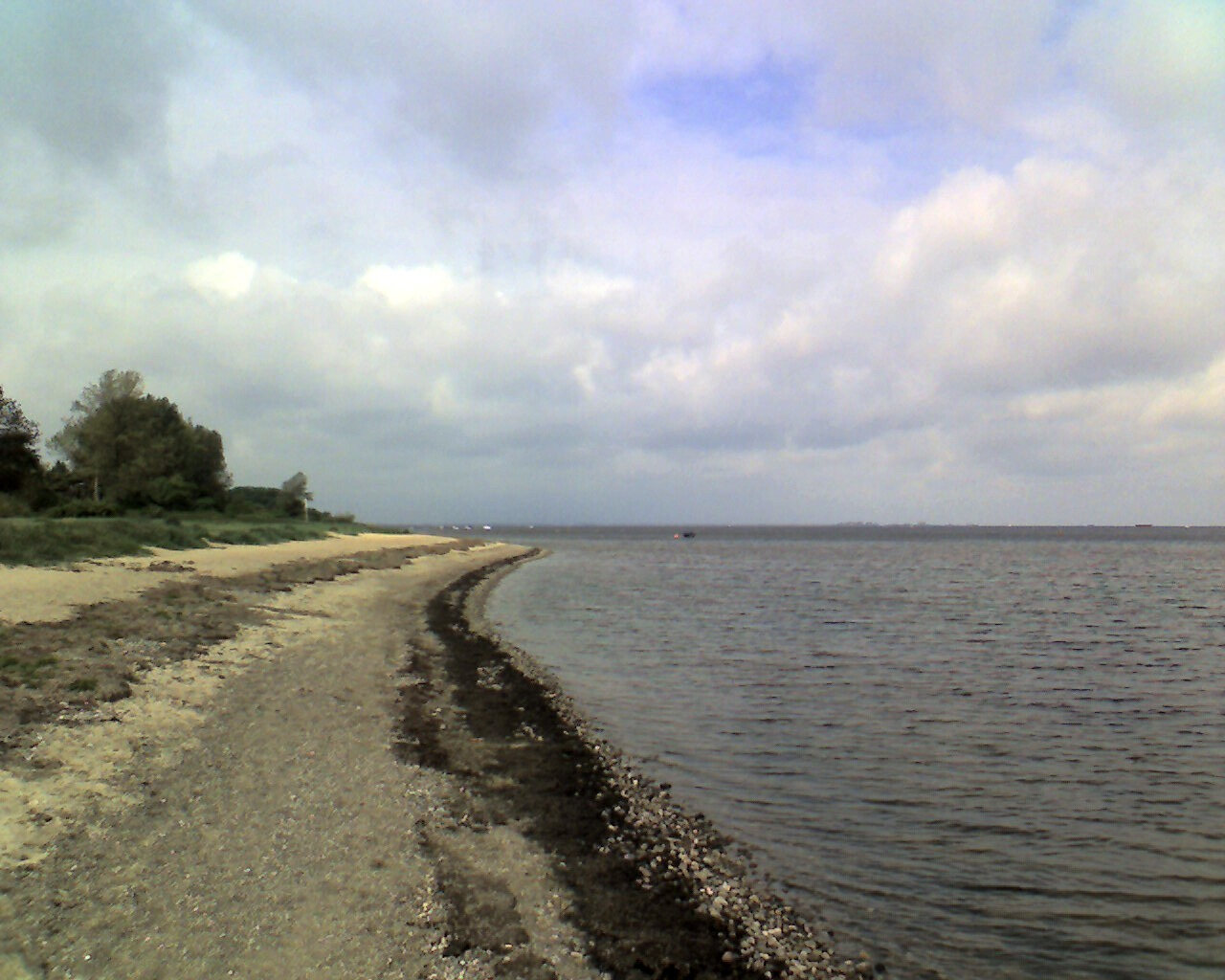
near Vierow

It consists of

- Brünzow,
- Klein Ernsthof,
- Kräpelin,
- Stilow,
- Stilow-Siedlung,
- Vierow.
