= Krummin =

- Municipality
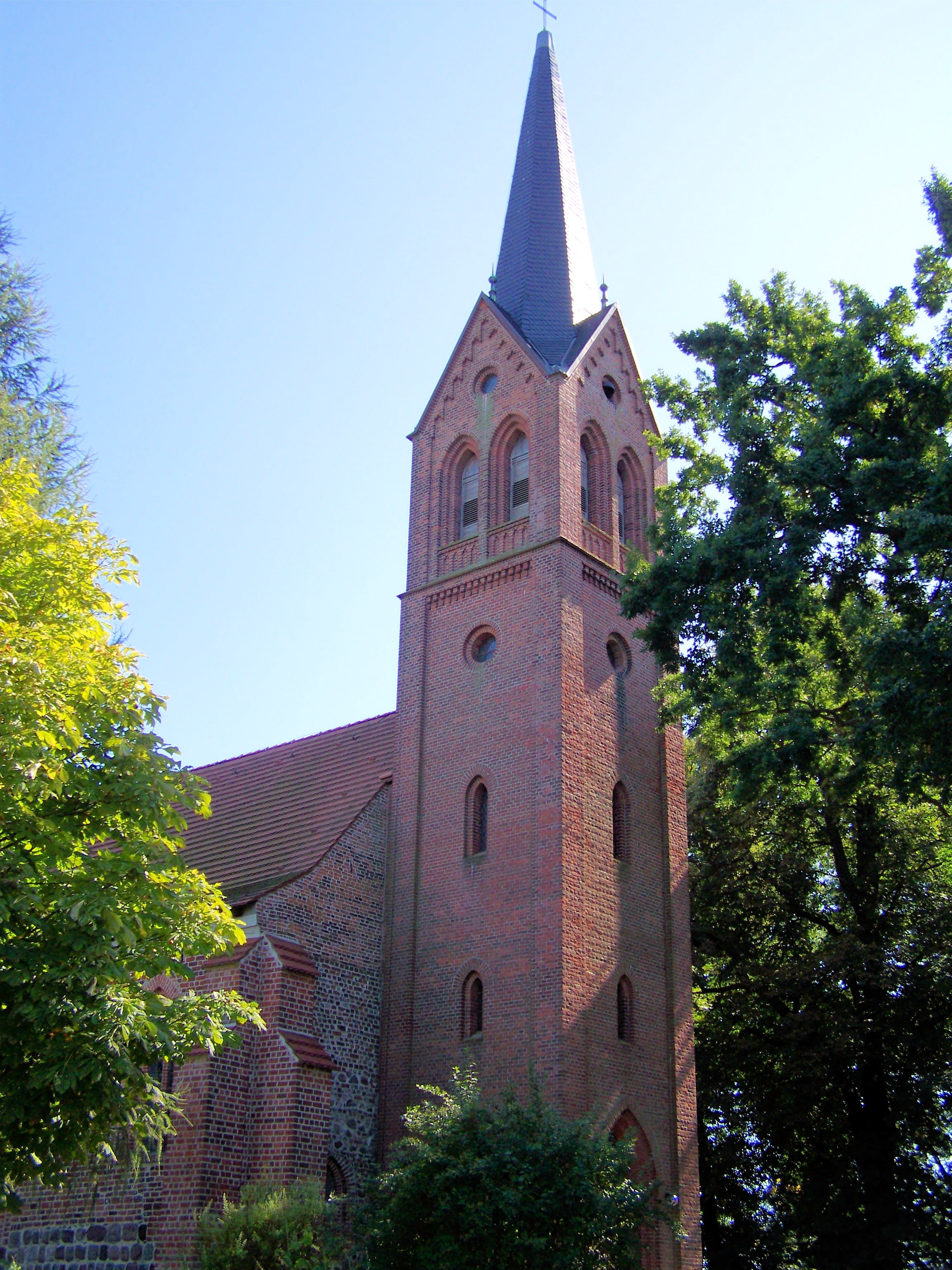
- St. Michael's Church in Krummin

- Location of Krummin within Vorpommern-Greifswald district
- Interactive map of Krummin
- Location within Germany Location within Mecklenburg-Vorpommern
- Coordinates: 54°03′N 13°50′E
- Country: Germany
- State: Mecklenburg-Vorpommern
- District: Vorpommern-Greifswald
- Municipal assoc.: Am Peenestrom

Government
  - Mayor: Jeannette von Busse

Area
  - Total: 10.70 km^{2} (4.13 sq mi)
- Elevation: 0 m (0 ft)

Population (2025-12-31)
  - Total: 224
  - Density: 20.9/km^{2} (54.2/sq mi)
- Time zone: UTC+01:00 (CET)
  - Summer (DST): UTC+02:00 (CEST)
- Postal codes: 17440
- Dialling codes: 03 8 36
- Vehicle registration: VG
- Website: www.amt-am-peenestrom.de

Krummin is a municipality in the Vorpommern-Greifswald district, in Mecklenburg-Vorpommern, Germany.
