= Koblentz =

- Municipality
- Location of Koblentz within Vorpommern-Greifswald district
- Interactive map of Koblentz
- Location within Germany Location within Mecklenburg-Vorpommern
- Coordinates: 53°31′N 14°08′E
- Country: Germany
- State: Mecklenburg-Vorpommern
- District: Vorpommern-Greifswald
- Municipal assoc.: Uecker-Randow-Tal

Government
  - Mayor: Ingelore Grygula

Area
  - Total: 22.99 km^{2} (8.88 sq mi)
- Elevation: 14 m (46 ft)

Population (2025-12-31)
  - Total: 194
  - Density: 8.44/km^{2} (21.9/sq mi)
- Time zone: UTC+01:00 (CET)
  - Summer (DST): UTC+02:00 (CEST)
- Postal codes: 17309
- Dialling codes: 039743, 039748
- Vehicle registration: VG
- Website: www.amt-uecker-randow-tal.de

Koblentz is a municipality in the Vorpommern-Greifswald district, in Mecklenburg-Vorpommern, Germany.

== History ==
From 1648 to 1720, Koblentz was part of Swedish Pomerania. From 1720 to 1945, it was part of the Prussian Province of Pomerania, from 1945 to 1952 of the State of Mecklenburg-Vorpommern, from 1952 to 1990 of the Bezirk Neubrandenburg of East Germany and since 1990 again of Mecklenburg-Vorpommern.

== Climate ==
Köppen-Geiger climate classification system classifies its climate as oceanic (Cfb).

Climate data for Koblentz
Month	Jan	Feb	Mar	Apr	May	Jun	Jul	Aug	Sep	Oct	Nov	Dec	Year
Mean daily maximum °C (°F)	0.9 (33.6)	2.1 (35.8)	7 (45)	12.8 (55.0)	18.2 (64.8)	21.7 (71.1)	23 (73)	22.9 (73.2)	18.9 (66.0)	13 (55)	6.9 (44.4)	3 (37)	12.5 (54.5)
Daily mean °C (°F)	−1.4 (29.5)	−0.6 (30.9)	3.5 (38.3)	8.4 (47.1)	13.1 (55.6)	16.8 (62.2)	18.3 (64.9)	18.1 (64.6)	14.6 (58.3)	9.8 (49.6)	4.5 (40.1)	0.9 (33.6)	8.8 (47.9)
Mean daily minimum °C (°F)	−3.7 (25.3)	−3.3 (26.1)	0 (32)	4 (39)	8.1 (46.6)	11.9 (53.4)	13.7 (56.7)	13.3 (55.9)	10.3 (50.5)	6.6 (43.9)	2.1 (35.8)	−1.2 (29.8)	5.1 (41.3)
Average precipitation mm (inches)	38 (1.5)	29 (1.1)	33 (1.3)	38 (1.5)	50 (2.0)	59 (2.3)	63 (2.5)	56 (2.2)	48 (1.9)	41 (1.6)	45 (1.8)	43 (1.7)	543 (21.4)
Source: Climate-Data.org (altitude: 7m)
