= Am Peenestrom =

- Amt
- Location of Am Peenestrom within Vorpommern-Greifswald district
- Interactive map of Am Peenestrom
- Location within Germany Location within Mecklenburg-Vorpommern
- Coordinates: 53°59′N 13°45′E
- Country: Germany
- State: Mecklenburg-Vorpommern
- District: Vorpommern-Greifswald
- Seat: Wolgast
- Subdivisions: 7 municipalities

Area
  - Total: 181.6 km^{2} (70.1 sq mi)

Population (2025-12-31)
  - Total: 13,895
  - Density: 76.51/km^{2} (198.2/sq mi)
- Time zone: UTC+01:00 (CET)
  - Summer (DST): UTC+02:00 (CEST)
- Website: www.amt-am-peenestrom.de

The Amt am Peenestrom is an Amt in the district of Vorpommern-Greifswald, in Mecklenburg-Vorpommern, Germany. The seat of the Amt is in Wolgast.

The Amt am Peenestrom consists of the following municipalities:

1. Buggenhagen
2. Krummin
3. Lassan
4. Lütow
5. Sauzin
6. Wolgast
7. Zemitz
