= Zemitz =

- Municipality
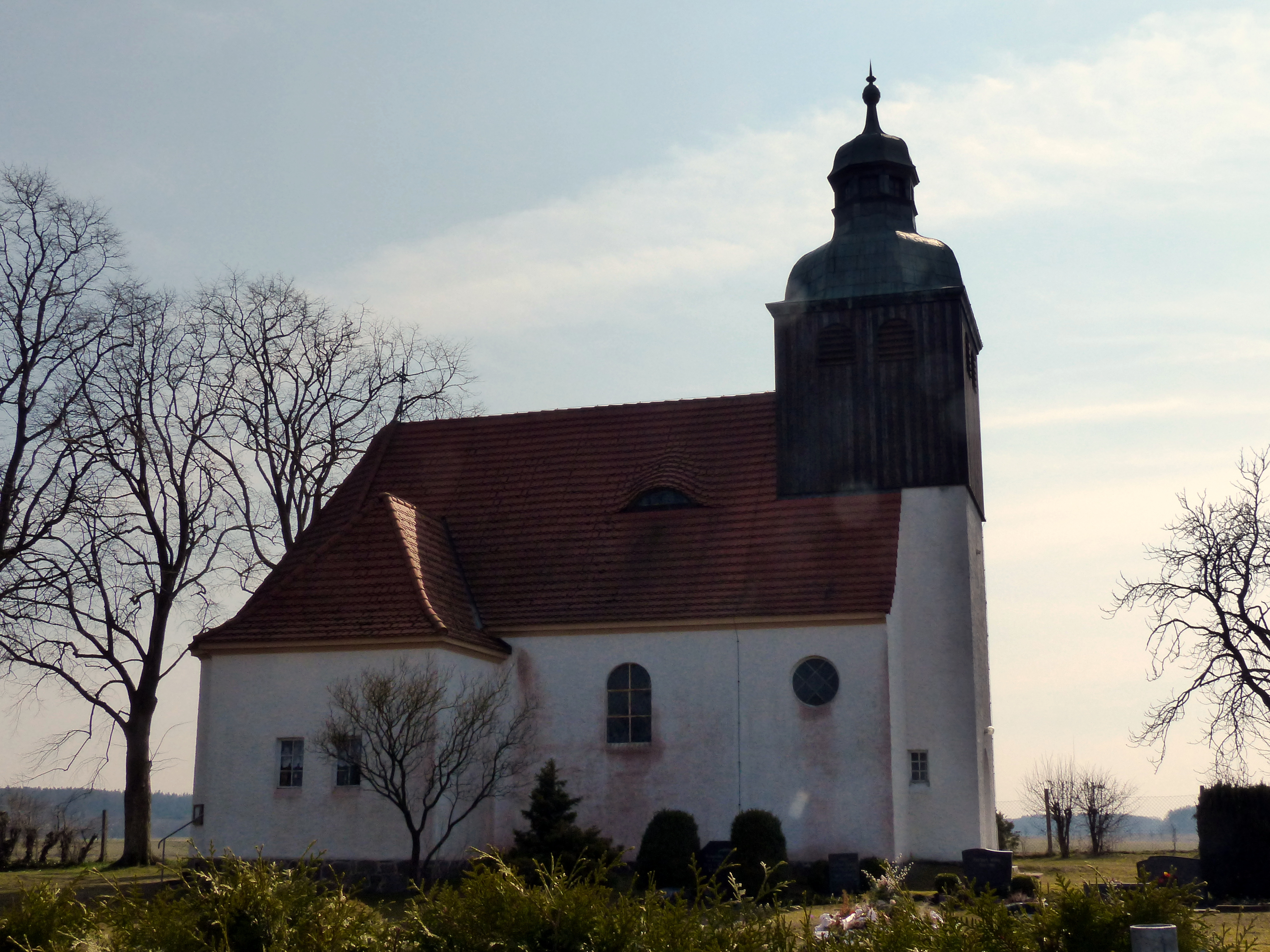
- Village church in Zemitz

- Location of Zemitz within Vorpommern-Greifswald district
- Interactive map of Zemitz
- Location within Germany Location within Mecklenburg-Vorpommern
- Coordinates: 53°59′N 13°45′E
- Country: Germany
- State: Mecklenburg-Vorpommern
- District: Vorpommern-Greifswald
- Municipal assoc.: Am Peenestrom
- Subdivisions: 5

Government
  - Mayor: Susanne Darmann

Area
  - Total: 30.94 km^{2} (11.95 sq mi)
- Elevation: 9 m (30 ft)

Population (2025-12-31)
  - Total: 583
  - Density: 18.8/km^{2} (48.8/sq mi)
- Time zone: UTC+01:00 (CET)
  - Summer (DST): UTC+02:00 (CEST)
- Postal codes: 17440
- Dialling codes: 03836, 038374
- Vehicle registration: VG
- Website: www.amt-am-peenestrom.de

Zemitz is a municipality in the Vorpommern-Greifswald district, in Mecklenburg-Vorpommern, Germany. It consists of

- Zemitz
- Hohensee
- Seckeritz
- Wehrland-Bauer
- Negenmark
