= Züssow (Amt) =

Amt in Mecklenburg-Vorpommern, Germany

- Amt
- Location of Züssow within Vorpommern-Greifswald district
- Interactive map of Züssow
- Location within Germany Location within Mecklenburg-Vorpommern
- Coordinates: 53°57′N 13°36′E
- Country: Germany
- State: Mecklenburg-Vorpommern
- District: Vorpommern-Greifswald
- Seat: Züssow
- Subdivisions: 13 municipalities

Area
  - Total: 392.25 km^{2} (151.45 sq mi)

Population (2025-12-31)
  - Total: 11,238
  - Density: 28.650/km^{2} (74.203/sq mi)
- Time zone: UTC+01:00 (CET)
  - Summer (DST): UTC+02:00 (CEST)
- Website: www.amt-zuessow.de

Züssow is an Amt in the district of Vorpommern-Greifswald, in Mecklenburg-Vorpommern, Germany. The seat of the amt is in Züssow.

The Amt of Züssow consists of the following communities (gemeinden), with a combined population of approximately 12,000 people:

1. Bandelin
2. Gribow
3. Groß Kiesow
4. Groß Polzin
5. Gützkow (town)
6. Karlsburg
7. Klein Bünzow
8. Murchin
9. Rubkow
10. Schmatzin
11. Wrangelsburg
12. Ziethen
13. Züssow
