= Görmin =

- Municipality
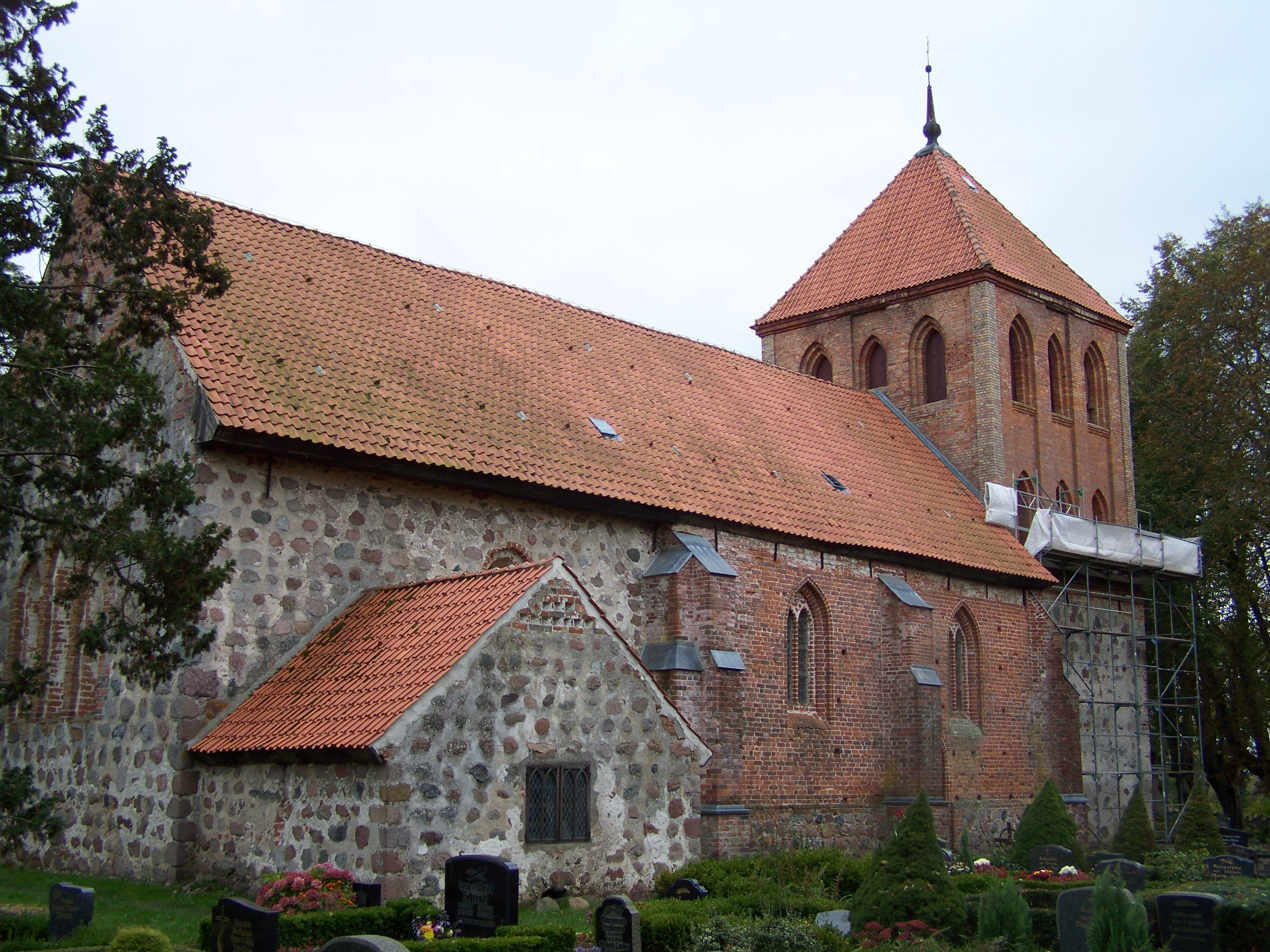
- Medieval village church in Görmin

- Location of Görmin within Vorpommern-Greifswald district
- Interactive map of Görmin
- Location within Germany Location within Mecklenburg-Vorpommern
- Coordinates: 53°58′N 13°16′E
- Country: Germany
- State: Mecklenburg-Vorpommern
- District: Vorpommern-Greifswald
- Municipal assoc.: Peenetal/Loitz
- Subdivisions: 8

Government
  - Mayor: Thomas Redwanz

Area
  - Total: 35.01 km^{2} (13.52 sq mi)
- Elevation: 12 m (39 ft)

Population (2025-12-31)
  - Total: 885
  - Density: 25.3/km^{2} (65.5/sq mi)
- Time zone: UTC+01:00 (CET)
  - Summer (DST): UTC+02:00 (CEST)
- Postal codes: 17121
- Dialling codes: 039992
- Vehicle registration: DM
- Website: www.loitz.de

Görmin is a municipality in the Vorpommern-Greifswald district, in Mecklenburg-Vorpommern, Germany.
