= Brietzig =

- Municipality
- Location of Brietzig within Vorpommern-Greifswald district
- Interactive map of Brietzig
- Location within Germany Location within Mecklenburg-Vorpommern
- Coordinates: 53°28′N 13°54′E
- Country: Germany
- State: Mecklenburg-Vorpommern
- District: Vorpommern-Greifswald
- Municipal assoc.: Uecker-Randow-Tal

Government
  - Mayor: Bernd Walter

Area
  - Total: 10.57 km^{2} (4.08 sq mi)
- Elevation: 45 m (148 ft)

Population (2025-12-31)
  - Total: 168
  - Density: 15.9/km^{2} (41.2/sq mi)
- Time zone: UTC+01:00 (CET)
  - Summer (DST): UTC+02:00 (CEST)
- Postal codes: 17309
- Dialling codes: 03973
- Vehicle registration: VG
- Website: www.amt-uecker-randow-tal.de

Brietzig is a municipality in the Vorpommern-Greifswald district, in Mecklenburg-Vorpommern, Germany.
