= Demenzsee =

Lake in Mecklenburg-Vorpommern in northern Germany

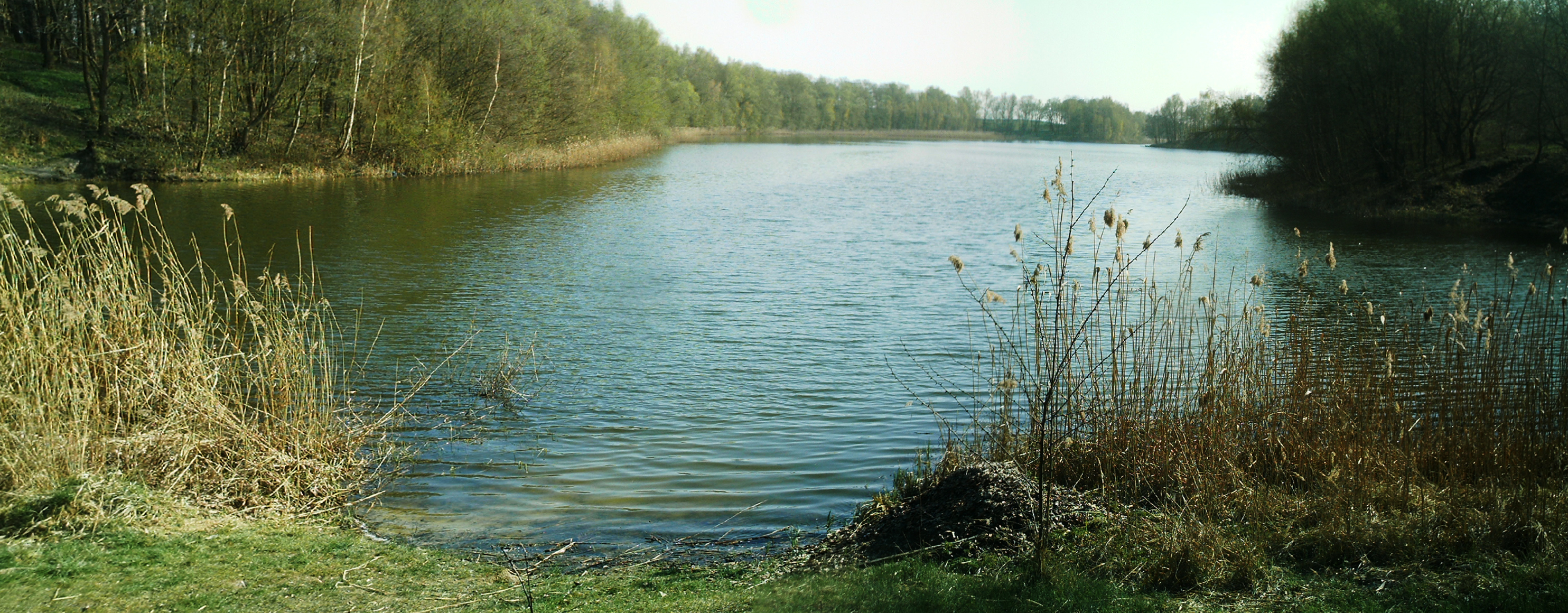

- Location within Mecklenburg-Vorpommern
- Location: Vorpommern-Greifswald, Mecklenburg-Vorpommern
- Coordinates: 53°33′2″N 13°48′2″E
- Basin countries: Germany
- Surface area: 0.18 km^{2} (0.069 sq mi)
- Max. depth: 26 m (85 ft)
- Surface elevation: 49 m (161 ft)

Demenzsee is a lake in the Vorpommern-Greifswald district in Mecklenburg-Vorpommern, Germany. At an elevation of 49 m, its surface area is 0.18 km^{2}.
