= Gribow =

- Municipality
- Location of Gribow within Vorpommern-Greifswald district
- Interactive map of Gribow
- Location within Germany Location within Mecklenburg-Vorpommern
- Coordinates: 53°57′N 13°29′E
- Country: Germany
- State: Mecklenburg-Vorpommern
- District: Vorpommern-Greifswald
- Municipal assoc.: Züssow

Government
  - Mayor: Thomas Peterson

Area
  - Total: 8.17 km^{2} (3.15 sq mi)
- Elevation: 19 m (62 ft)

Population (2025-12-31)
  - Total: 141
  - Density: 17.3/km^{2} (44.7/sq mi)
- Time zone: UTC+01:00 (CET)
  - Summer (DST): UTC+02:00 (CEST)
- Postal codes: 17506
- Dialling codes: 038355
- Vehicle registration: VG

Gribow is a municipality in the Vorpommern-Greifswald district, in Mecklenburg-Vorpommern, Germany.
