= Sauzin =

- Municipality
- Location of Sauzin within Vorpommern-Greifswald district
- Interactive map of Sauzin
- Location within Germany Location within Mecklenburg-Vorpommern
- Coordinates: 54°02′N 13°47′E
- Country: Germany
- State: Mecklenburg-Vorpommern
- District: Vorpommern-Greifswald
- Municipal assoc.: Am Peenestrom

Government
  - Mayor: Jürgen Steinbiß

Area
  - Total: 6.61 km^{2} (2.55 sq mi)
- Elevation: 0 m (0 ft)

Population (2025-12-31)
  - Total: 392
  - Density: 59.3/km^{2} (154/sq mi)
- Time zone: UTC+01:00 (CET)
  - Summer (DST): UTC+02:00 (CEST)
- Postal codes: 17440
- Dialling codes: 03 8 36
- Vehicle registration: VG
- Website: www.amt-am-peenestrom.de

Sauzin is a municipality in the Vorpommern-Greifswald district, in Mecklenburg-Vorpommern, Germany. It consists of Sauzin and Ziemitz.
