= Uecker-Randow-Tal =

Amt in Vorpommern-Greifswald, Mecklenburg-Vorpommern, Germany

- Amt
- Location of Uecker-Randow-Tal within Vorpommern-Greifswald district
- Interactive map of Uecker-Randow-Tal
- Location within Germany Location within Mecklenburg-Vorpommern
- Coordinates: 53°30′N 14°00′E
- Country: Germany
- State: Mecklenburg-Vorpommern
- District: Vorpommern-Greifswald
- Seat: Pasewalk
- Subdivisions: 13 municipalities

Area
  - Total: 290.52 km^{2} (112.17 sq mi)

Population (2025-12-31)
  - Total: 6,556
  - Density: 22.57/km^{2} (58.45/sq mi)
- Time zone: UTC+01:00 (CET)
  - Summer (DST): UTC+02:00 (CEST)
- Website: www.pasewalk.de/amt-uer-tal/

Uecker-Randow-Tal is an Amt in the district of Vorpommern-Greifswald, in Mecklenburg-Vorpommern, Germany. The seat of the Amt is in Pasewalk, itself not part of the Amt.

The Amt Uecker-Randow-Tal consists of the following municipalities:

1. Brietzig
2. Fahrenwalde
3. Groß Luckow
4. Jatznick
5. Koblentz
6. Krugsdorf
7. Nieden
8. Papendorf
9. Polzow
10. Rollwitz
11. Schönwalde
12. Viereck
13. Zerrenthin
