= Polzow =

- Municipality
- Location of Polzow within Vorpommern-Greifswald district
- Interactive map of Polzow
- Location within Germany Location within Mecklenburg-Vorpommern
- Coordinates: 53°30′N 14°04′E
- Country: Germany
- State: Mecklenburg-Vorpommern
- District: Vorpommern-Greifswald
- Municipal assoc.: Uecker-Randow-Tal

Government
  - Mayor: Lutz Schmidt

Area
  - Total: 8.50 km^{2} (3.28 sq mi)
- Elevation: 28 m (92 ft)

Population (2025-12-31)
  - Total: 237
  - Density: 27.9/km^{2} (72.2/sq mi)
- Time zone: UTC+01:00 (CET)
  - Summer (DST): UTC+02:00 (CEST)
- Postal codes: 17309
- Dialling codes: 039743
- Vehicle registration: VG
- Website: www.amt-uecker-randow-tal.de

Polzow is a municipality in the Vorpommern-Greifswald district, in Mecklenburg-Vorpommern, Germany.
