= Krugsdorf =

- Municipality
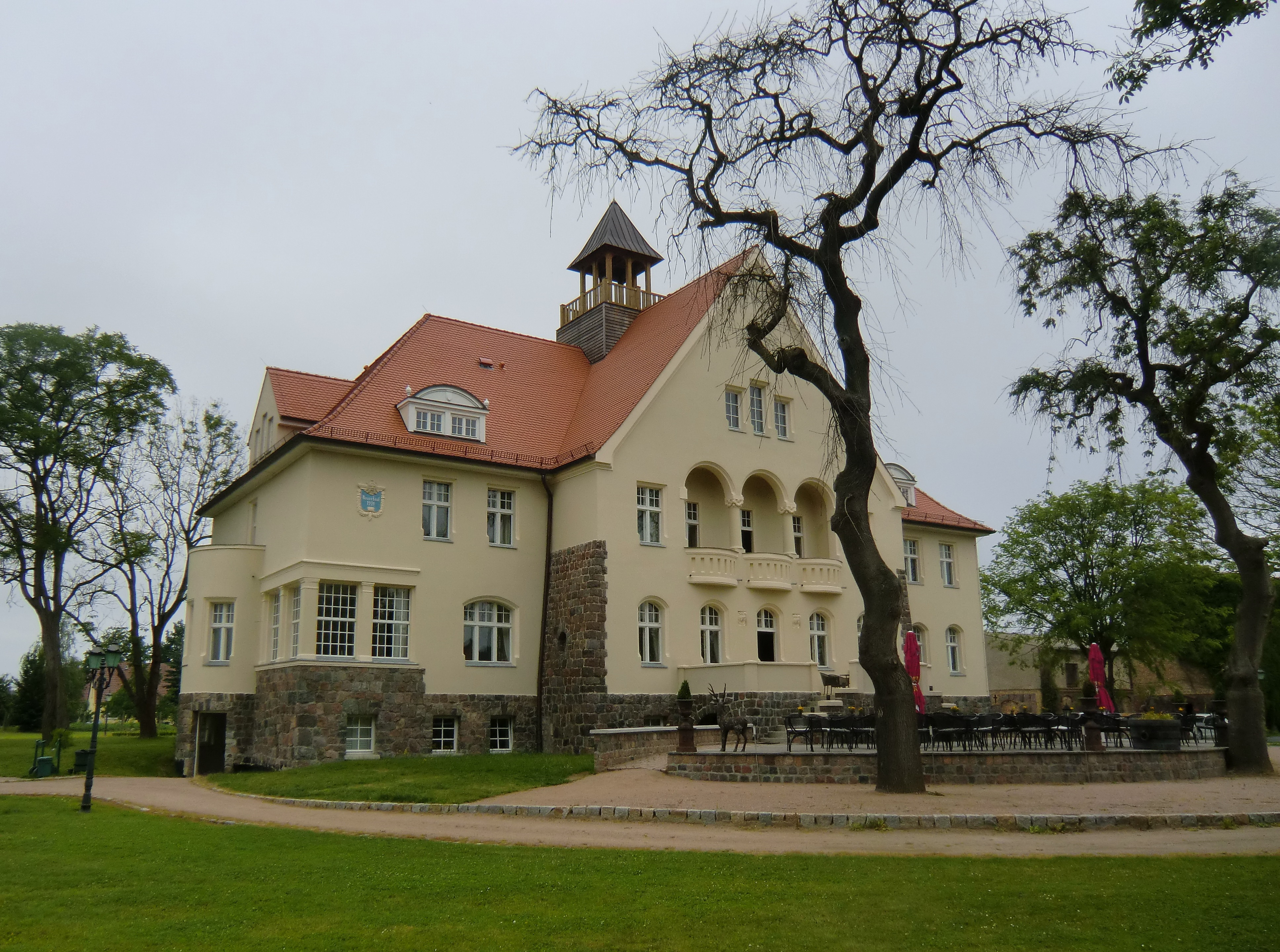
- Schloss Krugsdorf in Krugsdorf

- Location of Krugsdorf within Vorpommern-Greifswald district
- Interactive map of Krugsdorf
- Location within Germany Location within Mecklenburg-Vorpommern
- Coordinates: 53°30′N 14°05′E
- Country: Germany
- State: Mecklenburg-Vorpommern
- District: Vorpommern-Greifswald
- Municipal assoc.: Uecker-Randow-Tal

Government
  - Mayor: Ralf Schilling

Area
  - Total: 8.34 km^{2} (3.22 sq mi)
- Elevation: 17 m (56 ft)

Population (2025-12-31)
  - Total: 485
  - Density: 58.2/km^{2} (151/sq mi)
- Time zone: UTC+01:00 (CET)
  - Summer (DST): UTC+02:00 (CEST)
- Postal codes: 17309
- Dialling codes: 039743, 039748
- Vehicle registration: VG
- Website: www.amt-uecker-randow-tal.de

Krugsdorf is a municipality in the Vorpommern-Greifswald district, in Mecklenburg-Vorpommern, Germany.

== History ==
From 1648 to 1720, Krugsdorf was part of Swedish Pomerania. From 1720 to 1945, it was part of the Prussian Province of Pomerania, from 1945 to 1952 of the State of Mecklenburg-Vorpommern, from 1952 to 1990 of the Bezirk Neubrandenburg of East Germany and since 1990 again of Mecklenburg-Vorpommern.
