= Stolpe auf Usedom =

- Municipality
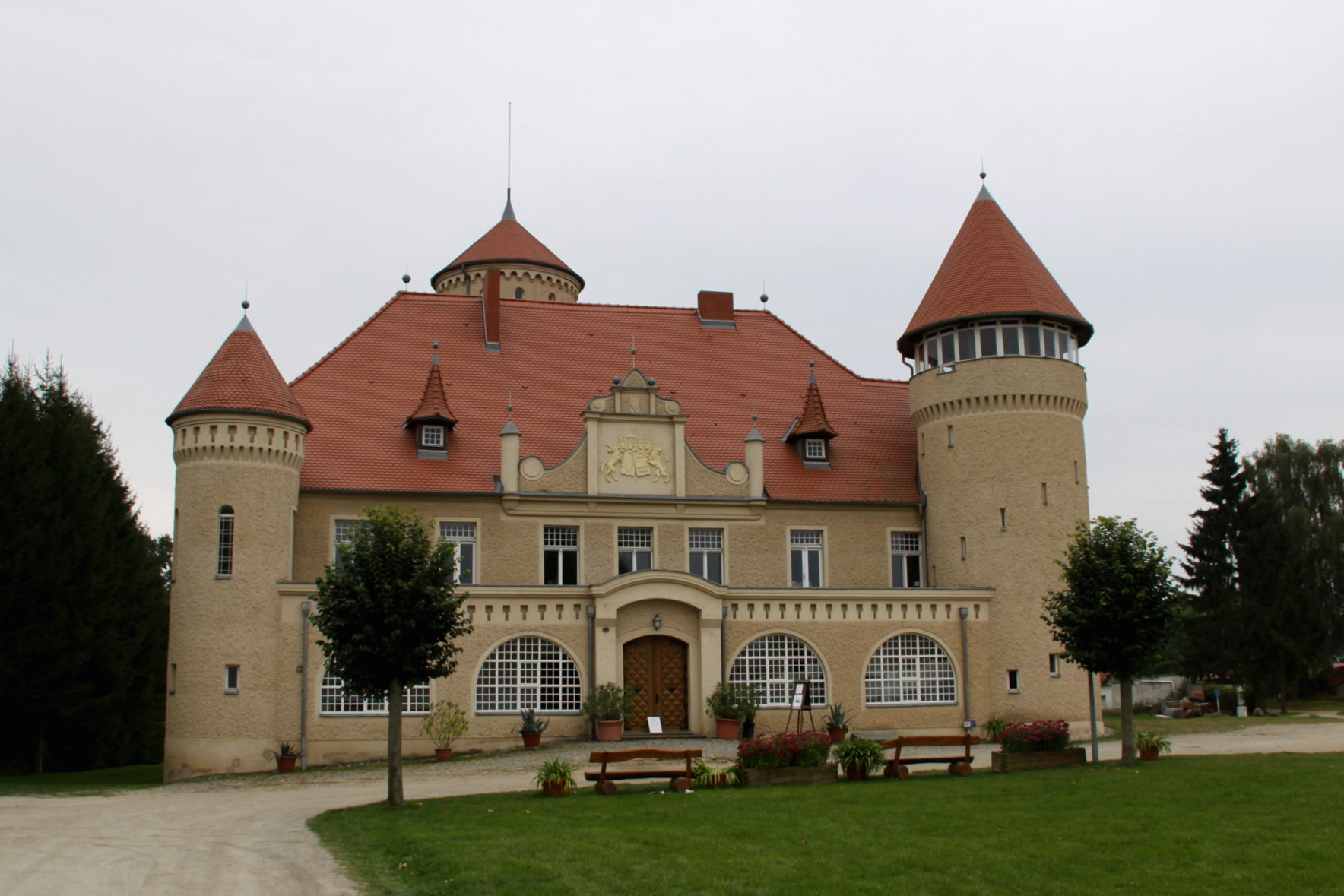
- Stolpe Castle

- Location of Stolpe auf Usedom within Vorpommern-Greifswald district
- Interactive map of Stolpe auf Usedom
- Location within Germany Location within Mecklenburg-Vorpommern
- Coordinates: 53°52′N 14°00′E
- Country: Germany
- State: Mecklenburg-Vorpommern
- District: Vorpommern-Greifswald
- Municipal assoc.: Usedom-Süd

Government
  - Mayor: Eckhardt Schulz

Area
  - Total: 14.86 km^{2} (5.74 sq mi)
- Elevation: 0 m (0 ft)

Population (2025-12-31)
  - Total: 348
  - Density: 23.4/km^{2} (60.7/sq mi)
- Time zone: UTC+01:00 (CET)
  - Summer (DST): UTC+02:00 (CEST)
- Postal codes: 17406
- Dialling codes: 038372
- Vehicle registration: VG

Stolpe auf Usedom is a municipality in the Vorpommern-Greifswald district, in Mecklenburg-Vorpommern, Germany.
