= Neu Boltenhagen =

- Municipality
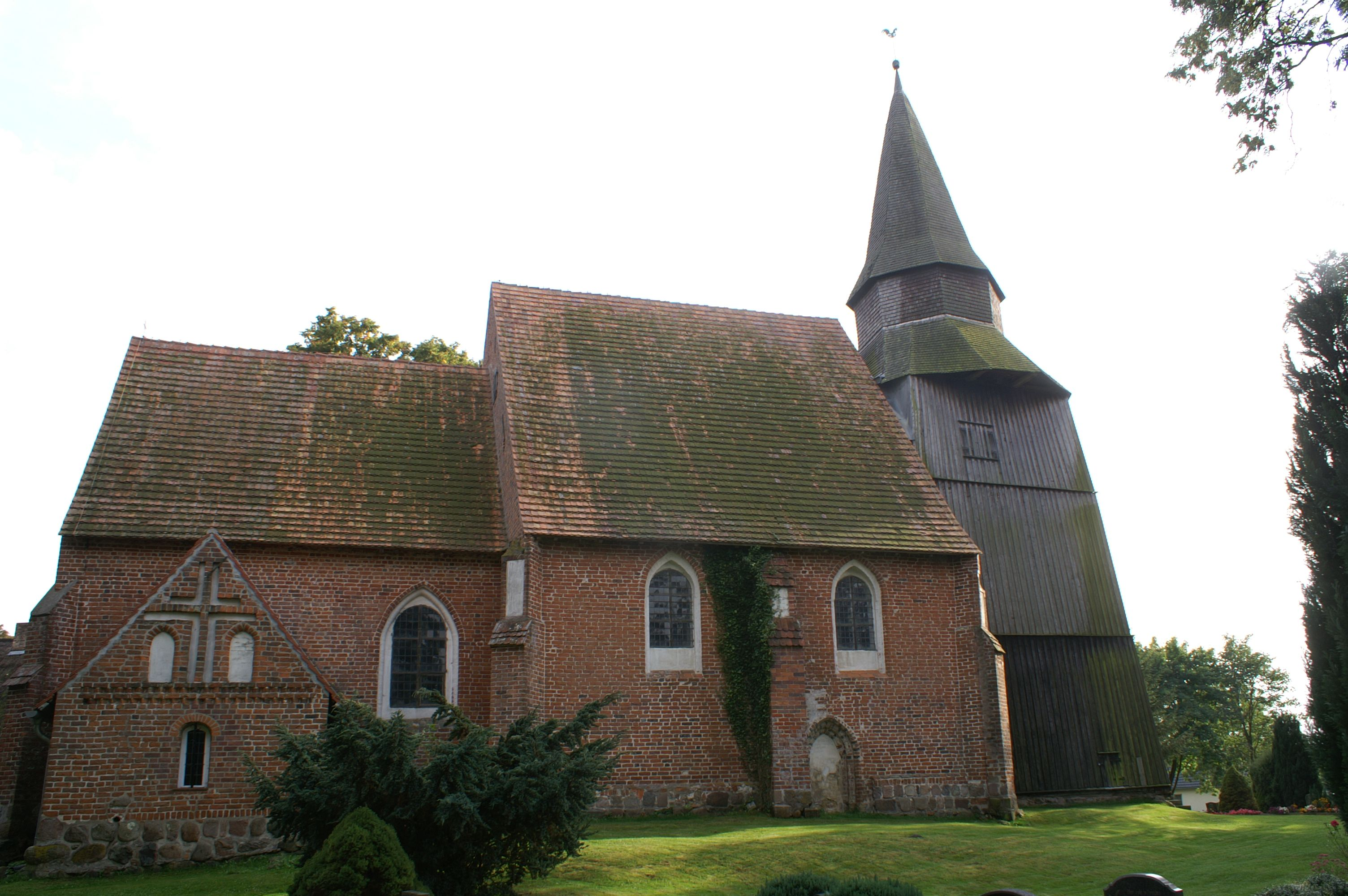
- Medieval church in Neu Boltenhagen

- Location of Neu Boltenhagen within Vorpommern-Greifswald district
- Interactive map of Neu Boltenhagen
- Location within Germany Location within Mecklenburg-Vorpommern
- Coordinates: 54°04′N 13°37′E
- Country: Germany
- State: Mecklenburg-Vorpommern
- District: Vorpommern-Greifswald
- Municipal assoc.: Lubmin
- Subdivisions: 4

Government
  - Mayor: Siegfried Krüger

Area
  - Total: 24.37 km^{2} (9.41 sq mi)
- Elevation: 22 m (72 ft)

Population (2025-12-31)
  - Total: 564
  - Density: 23.1/km^{2} (59.9/sq mi)
- Time zone: UTC+01:00 (CET)
  - Summer (DST): UTC+02:00 (CEST)
- Postal codes: 17509
- Dialling codes: 038373
- Vehicle registration: VG
- Website: www.amtlubmin.de

Neu Boltenhagen is a municipality in the Vorpommern-Greifswald district, in Mecklenburg-Vorpommern, Germany.
