= Zirchow =

- Municipality
- Location of Zirchow within Vorpommern-Greifswald district
- Interactive map of Zirchow
- Location within Germany Location within Mecklenburg-Vorpommern
- Coordinates: 53°53′N 14°08′E
- Country: Germany
- State: Mecklenburg-Vorpommern
- District: Vorpommern-Greifswald
- Municipal assoc.: Usedom-Süd

Government
  - Mayor: Gerd Wendlandt

Area
  - Total: 9.53 km^{2} (3.68 sq mi)
- Elevation: 17 m (56 ft)

Population (2025-12-31)
  - Total: 617
  - Density: 64.7/km^{2} (168/sq mi)
- Time zone: UTC+01:00 (CET)
  - Summer (DST): UTC+02:00 (CEST)
- Postal codes: 17419
- Dialling codes: 038376
- Vehicle registration: VG

Zirchow is a municipality in the Vorpommern-Greifswald district, in Mecklenburg-Vorpommern, Germany.
