= Korswandt =

- Municipality
- Location of Korswandt within Vorpommern-Greifswald district
- Interactive map of Korswandt
- Location within Germany Location within Mecklenburg-Vorpommern
- Coordinates: 53°55′N 14°10′E
- Country: Germany
- State: Mecklenburg-Vorpommern
- District: Vorpommern-Greifswald
- Municipal assoc.: Usedom-Süd

Government
  - Mayor: Karl-Josef Wurzel

Area
  - Total: 12.8 km^{2} (4.9 sq mi)
- Elevation: 15 m (49 ft)

Population (2025-12-31)
  - Total: 567
  - Density: 44.3/km^{2} (115/sq mi)
- Time zone: UTC+01:00 (CET)
  - Summer (DST): UTC+02:00 (CEST)
- Postal codes: 17419
- Dialling codes: 038378
- Vehicle registration: VG
- Website: Gemeinde Korswandt

Korswandt is a municipality in the Vorpommern-Greifswald district, in Mecklenburg-Vorpommern, Germany.
