= Rankwitz =

- Municipality
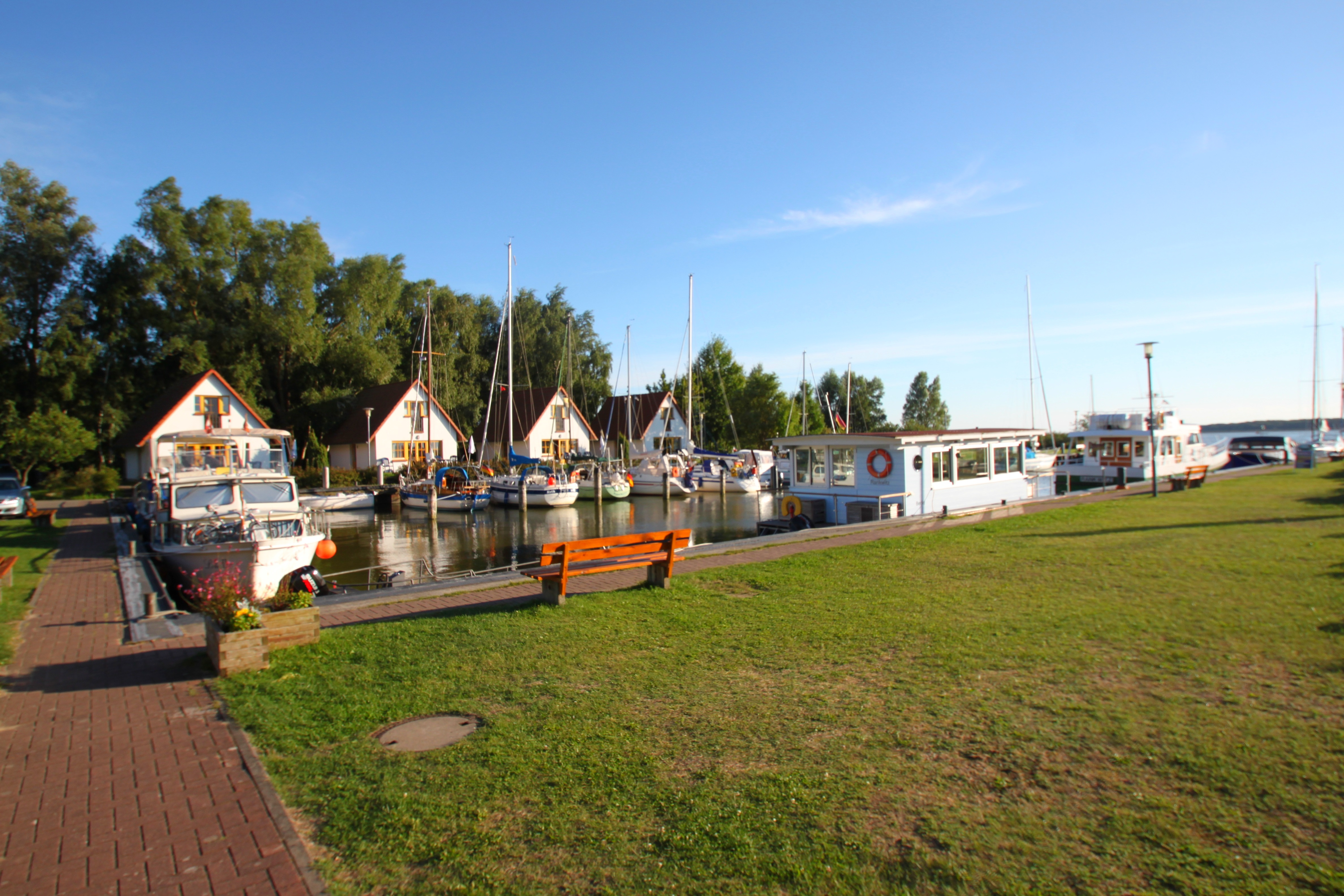
- Rankwitz Harbor

- Coat of arms

- Location of Rankwitz within Vorpommern-Greifswald district
- Interactive map of Rankwitz
- Location within Germany Location within Mecklenburg-Vorpommern
- Coordinates: 53°57′N 13°56′E
- Country: Germany
- State: Mecklenburg-Vorpommern
- District: Vorpommern-Greifswald
- Municipal assoc.: Usedom-Süd
- Subdivisions: 8

Government
  - Mayor: Arno Volkwardt

Area
  - Total: 30.72 km^{2} (11.86 sq mi)
- Elevation: 2 m (6.6 ft)

Population (2025-12-31)
  - Total: 523
  - Density: 17.0/km^{2} (44.1/sq mi)
- Time zone: UTC+01:00 (CET)
  - Summer (DST): UTC+02:00 (CEST)
- Postal codes: 17406
- Dialling codes: 038372
- Vehicle registration: VG

Rankwitz is a municipality in the Vorpommern-Greifswald district, in Mecklenburg-Vorpommern, Germany.

The economy of Rankwitz depends on tourism. There are many summer homes. Attractions include boating, fishing, and a historical museum.
