= Buggenhagen =

- Municipality
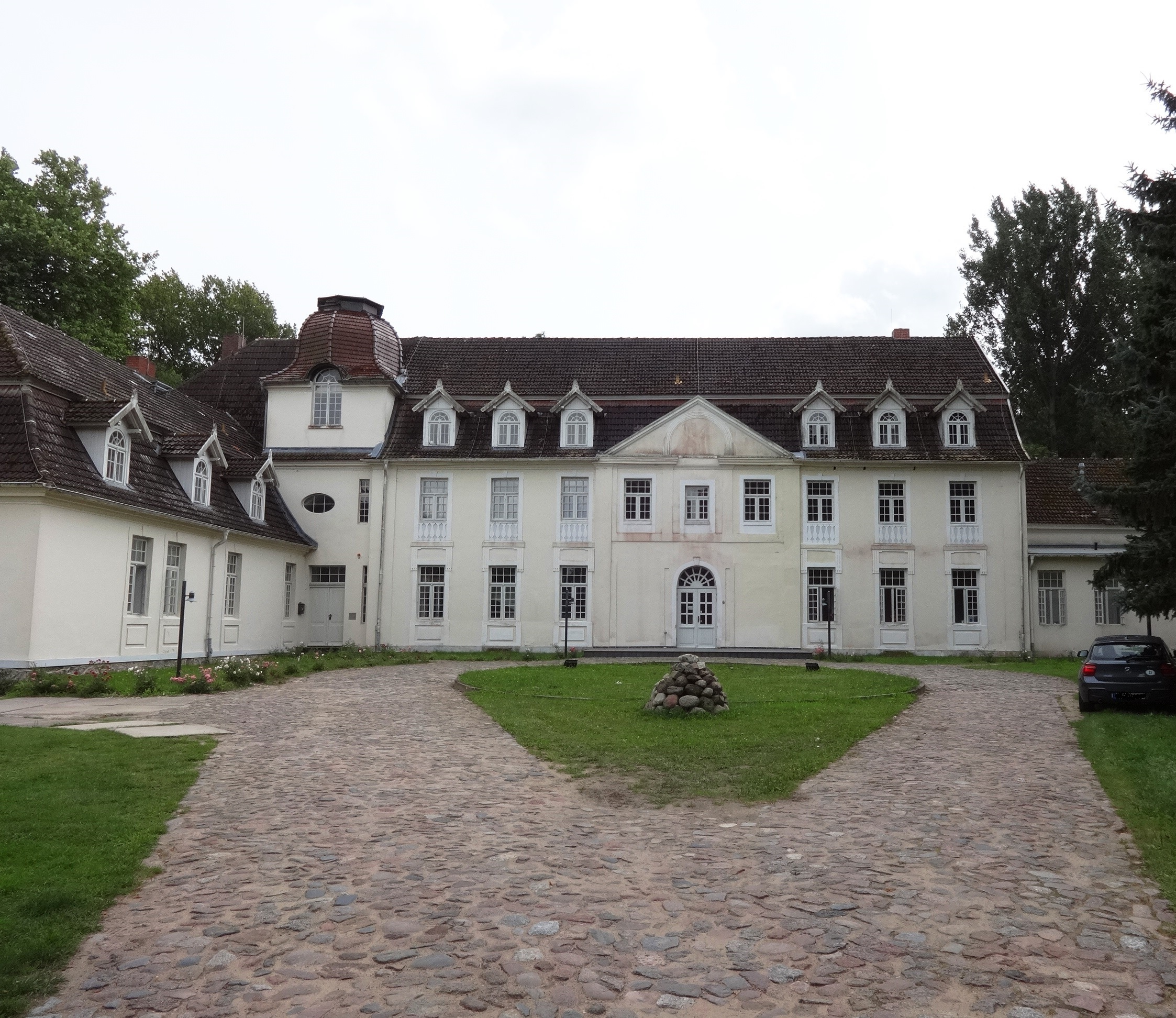
- Herrenhaus Buggenhagen in Buggenhagen

- Location of Buggenhagen within Vorpommern-Greifswald district
- Interactive map of Buggenhagen
- Location within Germany Location within Mecklenburg-Vorpommern
- Coordinates: 53°55′N 13°52′E
- Country: Germany
- State: Mecklenburg-Vorpommern
- District: Vorpommern-Greifswald
- Municipal assoc.: Am Peenestrom
- Subdivisions: 4

Government
  - Mayor: Manfred Studier

Area
  - Total: 27.03 km^{2} (10.44 sq mi)
- Elevation: 0 m (0 ft)

Population (2025-12-31)
  - Total: 183
  - Density: 6.77/km^{2} (17.5/sq mi)
- Time zone: UTC+01:00 (CET)
  - Summer (DST): UTC+02:00 (CEST)
- Postal codes: 17440
- Dialling codes: 03 8 374
- Vehicle registration: VG
- Website: www.amt-am-peenestrom.de

Buggenhagen is a municipality in the Vorpommern-Greifswald district, in Mecklenburg-Vorpommern, Germany.
