= Murchin =

- Municipality
- Location of Murchin within Vorpommern-Greifswald district
- Interactive map of Murchin
- Location within Germany Location within Mecklenburg-Vorpommern
- Coordinates: 53°54′N 13°44′E
- Country: Germany
- State: Mecklenburg-Vorpommern
- District: Vorpommern-Greifswald
- Municipal assoc.: Züssow
- Subdivisions: 5

Government
  - Mayor: Peter Dinse

Area
  - Total: 46.27 km^{2} (17.86 sq mi)
- Elevation: 14 m (46 ft)

Population (2025-12-31)
  - Total: 818
  - Density: 17.7/km^{2} (45.8/sq mi)
- Time zone: UTC+01:00 (CET)
  - Summer (DST): UTC+02:00 (CEST)
- Postal codes: 17390
- Dialling codes: 03971/038374
- Vehicle registration: VG
- Website: www.amt-zuessow.de

Murchin is a municipality in the Vorpommern-Greifswald district, in Mecklenburg-Vorpommern, Germany.
