= Großer Mützelburger See =

Lake in Germany and Poland

Großer Mützelburger See (Jezioro Myśliborskie Wielkie)
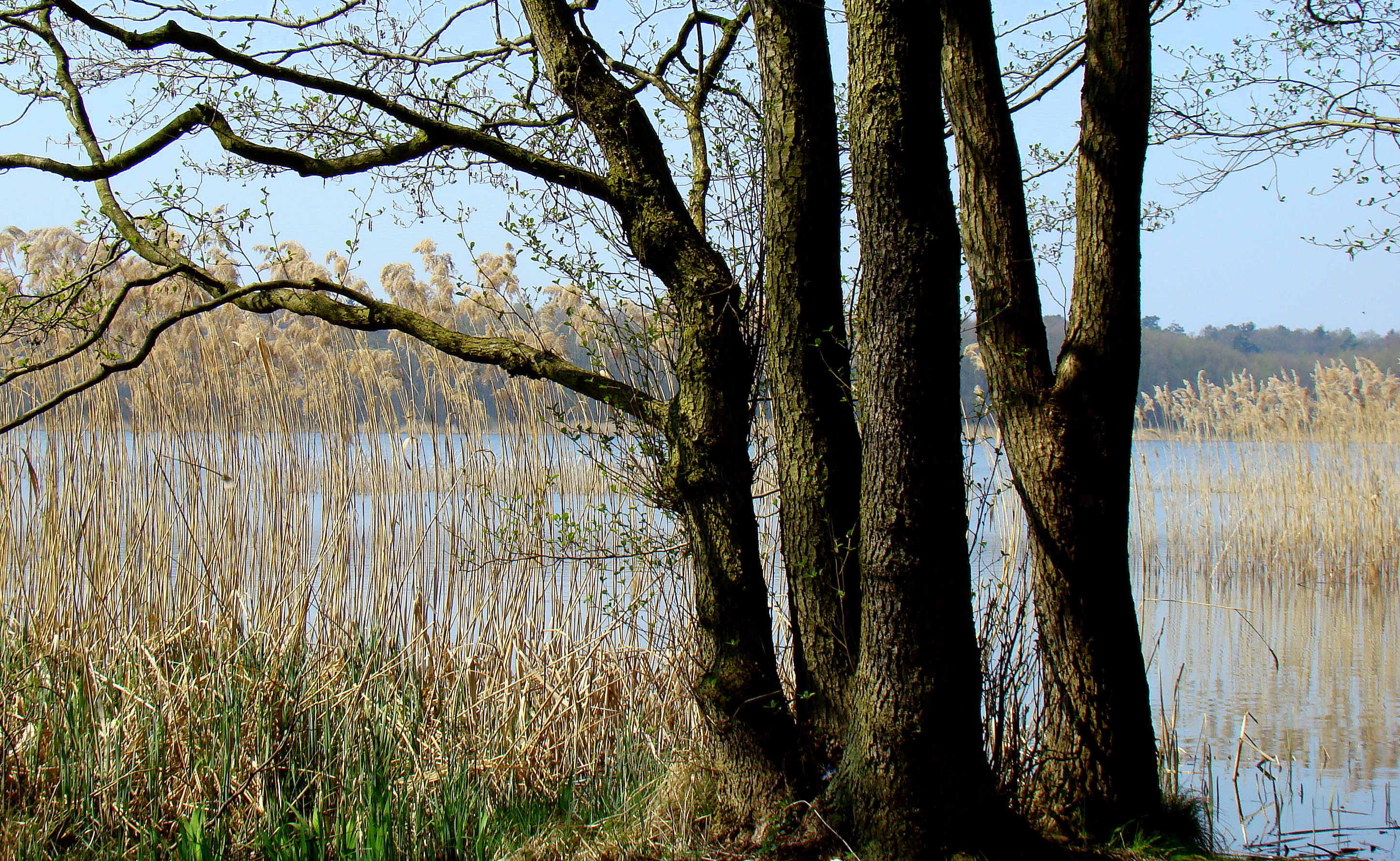

- Location within Mecklenburg-Vorpommern
- Location: Germany - Vorpommern-Greifswald, Mecklenburg-Vorpommern; Poland - Police County, West Pomeranian Voivodeship,
- Coordinates: 53.6513°N 14.2845°E
- Primary outflows: Mützelburger Beeke (Myśliborka)
- Basin countries: Germany, Poland
- Surface area: 1.14 km^{2} (0.44 sq mi)
- Max. depth: 2.8 m (9 ft 2 in)
- Surface elevation: 4.5 m (15 ft)

Großer Mützelburger See (Jezioro Myśliborskie Wielkie) - is a lake in Ueckermünder Heide (Puszcza Wkrzańska), Vorpommern-Greifswald, Mecklenburg-Vorpommern, Germany and Police County, West Pomeranian Voivodeship, Poland. At an elevation of 4.5 m, its surface area is 1.14 km².
