= Pulower See =

Lake in Germany

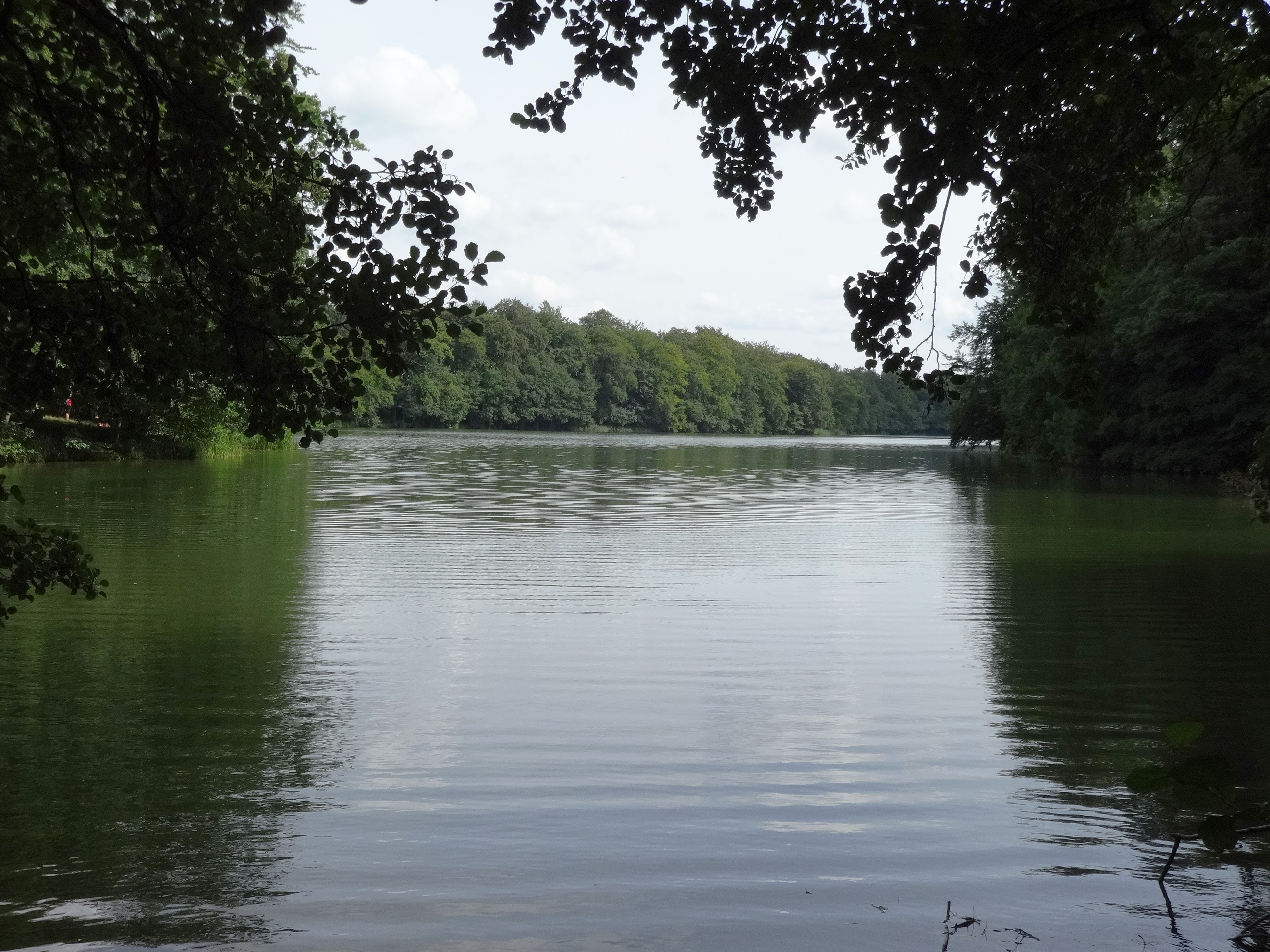

- Location within Mecklenburg-Vorpommern
- Location: Vorpommern-Greifswald, Mecklenburg-Vorpommern
- Coordinates: 53.95362°N 13.79517°E
- Basin countries: Germany
- Surface area: 0.103 km^{2} (0.040 sq mi)
- Max. depth: 10 m (33 ft)
- Surface elevation: 10.9 m (36 ft)

Pulower See is a lake in the Vorpommern-Greifswald district in Mecklenburg-Vorpommern, Germany. At an elevation of 10.9 m, its surface area is 0.103 km^{2}.
