= Lubmin (Amt) =

Amt in Mecklenburg-Vorpommern, Germany

- Amt
- Location of Lubmin within Vorpommern-Greifswald district
- Interactive map of Lubmin
- Location within Germany Location within Mecklenburg-Vorpommern
- Coordinates: 54°07′N 13°44′E
- Country: Germany
- State: Mecklenburg-Vorpommern
- District: Vorpommern-Greifswald
- Seat: Lubmin
- Subdivisions: 10 municipalities

Area
  - Total: 202.39 km^{2} (78.14 sq mi)

Population (2025-12-31)
  - Total: 10,435
  - Density: 51.559/km^{2} (133.54/sq mi)
- Time zone: UTC+01:00 (CET)
  - Summer (DST): UTC+02:00 (CEST)
- Website: www.amtlubmin.de

Lubmin is an Amt in the district of Vorpommern-Greifswald, in Mecklenburg-Vorpommern, Germany. The seat of the Amt is in Lubmin.

The Amt Lubmin consists of the following municipalities:

1. Brünzow
2. Hanshagen
3. Katzow
4. Kemnitz
5. Kröslin
6. Loissin
7. Lubmin
8. Neu Boltenhagen
9. Rubenow
10. Wusterhusen
