= Usedom-Süd =

Amt in Mecklenburg-Vorpommern, Germany

- Amt
- Location of Usedom-Süd within Vorpommern-Greifswald district
- Interactive map of Usedom-Süd
- Location within Germany Location within Mecklenburg-Vorpommern
- Coordinates: 53°56′N 14°03′E
- Country: Germany
- State: Mecklenburg-Vorpommern
- District: Vorpommern-Greifswald
- Seat: Usedom
- Subdivisions: 15 municipalities

Area
  - Total: 235.04 km^{2} (90.75 sq mi)

Population (2025-12-31)
  - Total: 10,828
  - Density: 46.069/km^{2} (119.32/sq mi)
- Time zone: UTC+01:00 (CET)
  - Summer (DST): UTC+02:00 (CEST)
- Website: www.amtusedom-sued.de

Usedom-Süd is an Amt in the district of Vorpommern-Greifswald, in Mecklenburg-Vorpommern, Germany. The seat of the Amt is in the town Usedom.

The Amt Usedom-Süd consists of the following municipalities:

1. Benz
2. Dargen
3. Garz
4. Kamminke
5. Korswandt
6. Koserow
7. Loddin
8. Mellenthin
9. Pudagla
10. Rankwitz
11. Stolpe auf Usedom
12. Ückeritz
13. Usedom
14. Zempin
15. Zirchow
