= Straßensee =

Lake in Germany

- Location within Mecklenburg-Vorpommern
- Location: Vorpommern-Greifswald, Mecklenburg-Vorpommern
- Coordinates: 53.90999°N 13.82434°E
- Basin countries: Germany
- Surface area: 0.131 km^{2} (0.051 sq mi)
- Max. depth: 5 m (16 ft)
- Surface elevation: 10.9 m (36 ft)

Straßensee is a lake in the Vorpommern-Greifswald district in Mecklenburg-Vorpommern, Germany. At an elevation of 10.9 m, its surface area is 0.131 km^{2}.
