= Schmatzin =

- Municipality
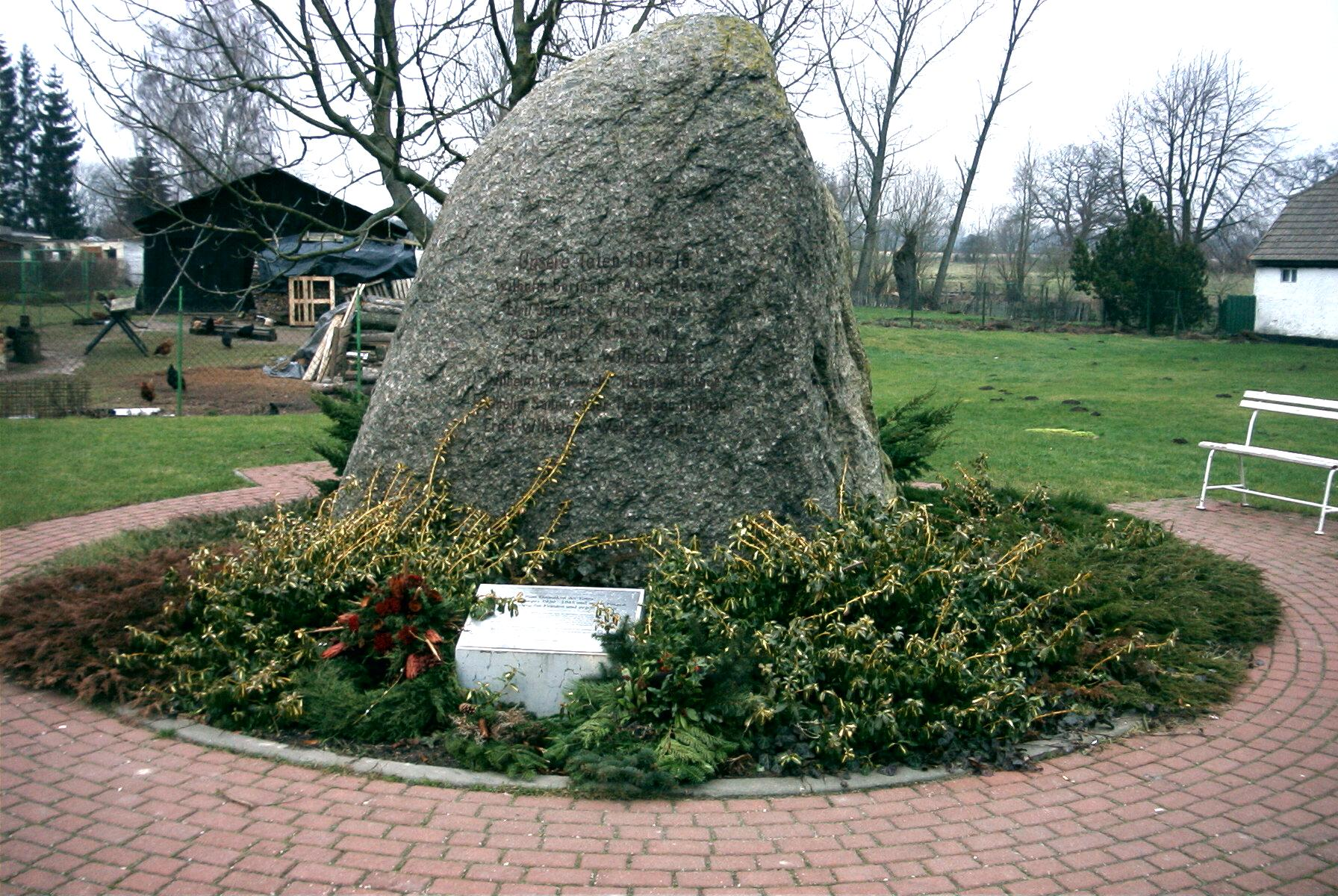
- War memorial in Schmatzin

- Location of Schmatzin within Vorpommern-Greifswald district
- Interactive map of Schmatzin
- Location within Germany Location within Mecklenburg-Vorpommern
- Coordinates: 53°55′N 13°33′E
- Country: Germany
- State: Mecklenburg-Vorpommern
- District: Vorpommern-Greifswald
- Municipal assoc.: Züssow
- Subdivisions: 3

Government
  - Mayor: Klaus Brandt

Area
  - Total: 17.65 km^{2} (6.81 sq mi)
- Elevation: 19 m (62 ft)

Population (2025-12-31)
  - Total: 273
  - Density: 15.5/km^{2} (40.1/sq mi)
- Time zone: UTC+01:00 (CET)
  - Summer (DST): UTC+02:00 (CEST)
- Postal codes: 17390
- Dialling codes: 039724
- Vehicle registration: VG
- Website: www.amt-zuessow.de

Schmatzin is a municipality in the Vorpommern-Greifswald district, in Mecklenburg-Vorpommern, Germany.
