= Katzow =

- Municipality
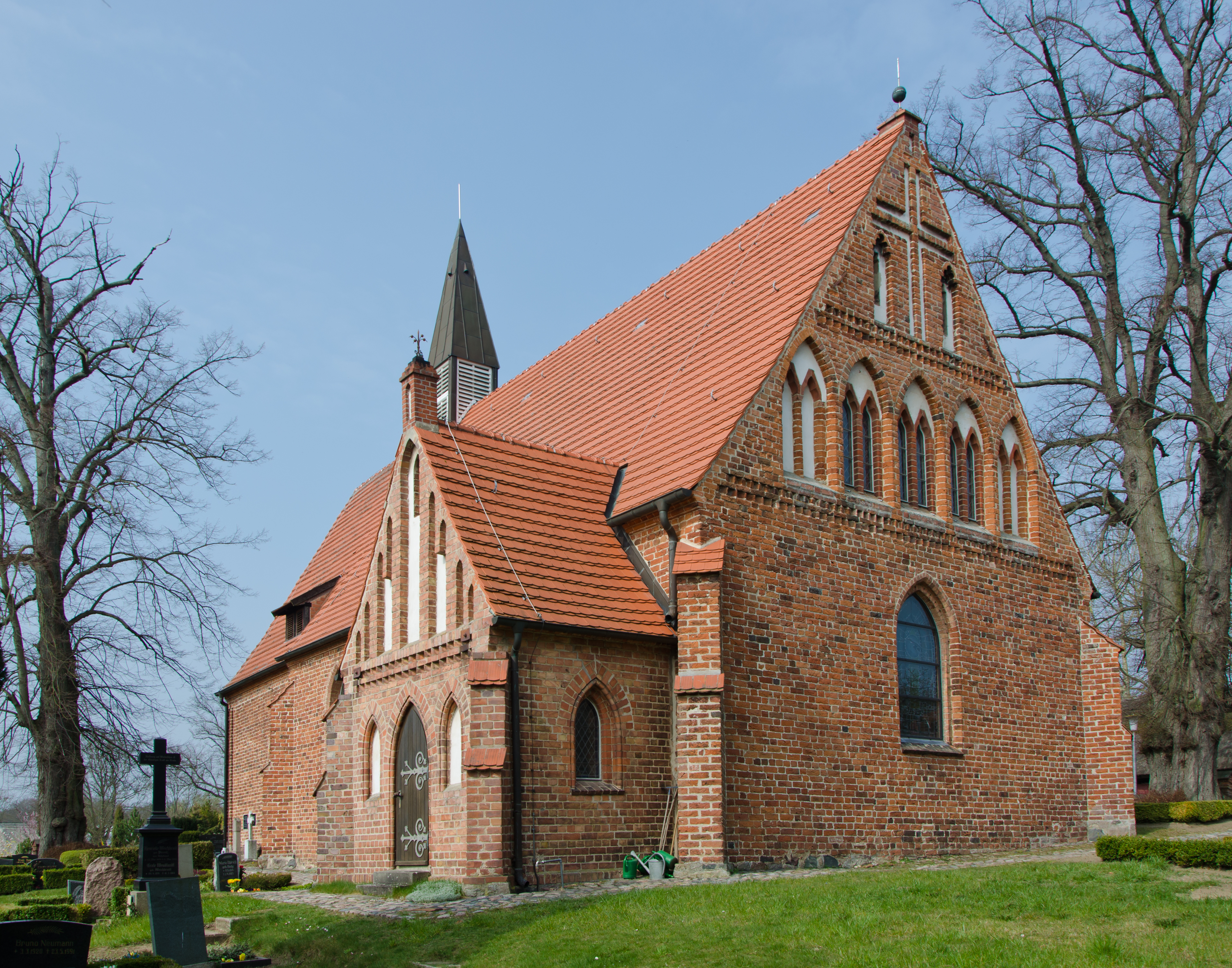
- Medieval village church in Katzow

- Location of Katzow within Vorpommern-Greifswald district
- Interactive map of Katzow
- Location within Germany Location within Mecklenburg-Vorpommern
- Coordinates: 54°03′N 13°41′E
- Country: Germany
- State: Mecklenburg-Vorpommern
- District: Vorpommern-Greifswald
- Municipal assoc.: Lubmin
- Subdivisions: 4

Government
  - Mayor: Norbert Labahn

Area
  - Total: 26.20 km^{2} (10.12 sq mi)
- Elevation: 18 m (59 ft)

Population (2025-12-31)
  - Total: 590
  - Density: 23/km^{2} (58/sq mi)
- Time zone: UTC+01:00 (CET)
  - Summer (DST): UTC+02:00 (CEST)
- Postal codes: 17509
- Dialling codes: 038373
- Vehicle registration: VG
- Website: www.amtlubmin.de

Katzow is a municipality in the Vorpommern-Greifswald district, in Mecklenburg-Vorpommern, Germany. It consists of

- Katzow
- Kühlenhagen
- Jägerhof
- Netzeband
