= Schloßsee =

Lake in Buggenhagen, Germany

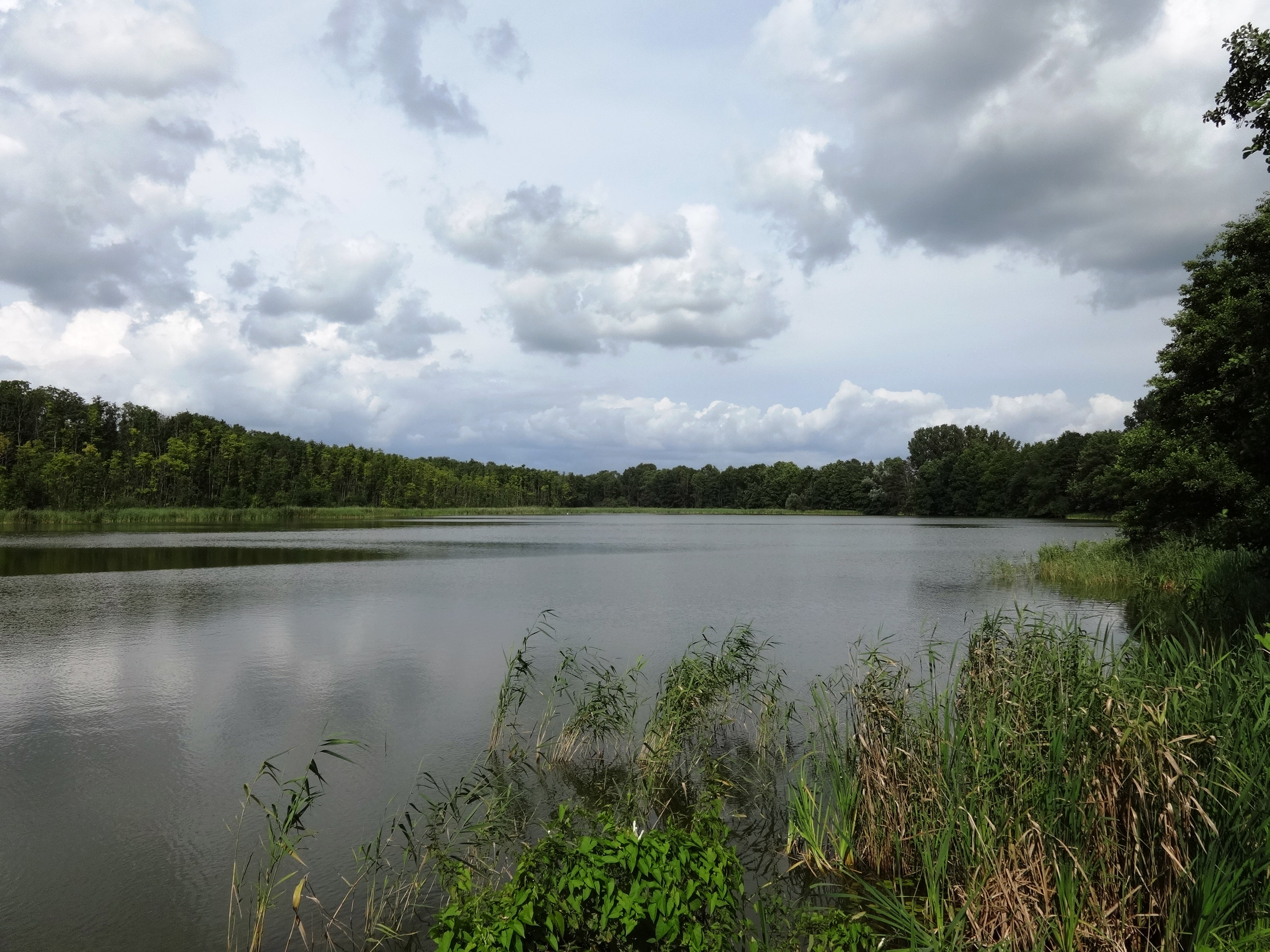

- Location within Mecklenburg-Vorpommern
- Location: Vorpommern-Greifswald, Mecklenburg-Vorpommern
- Coordinates: 53.92023°N 13.86984°E
- Primary outflows: Jamitzower Kanal
- Basin countries: Germany
- Surface area: 10 ha (25 acres)
- Surface elevation: −0.5 m (−1.6 ft)

Schloßsee is a lake in the Vorpommern-Greifswald district in Mecklenburg-Vorpommern, Germany. At an elevation of -0.5 m, its surface area is 0.1 km^{2}.
