= Berliner See =

Lake in Mecklenburg-Vorpommern, Germany

- Location within Mecklenburg-Vorpommern
- Location: Vorpommern-Greifswald, Mecklenburg-Vorpommern
- Coordinates: 53.92331°N 13.84518°E
- Basin countries: Germany
- Surface area: 0.062 km^{2} (0.024 sq mi)
- Max. depth: 10 m (33 ft)
- Surface elevation: 7.5 m (25 ft)

Berliner See is a lake in the Vorpommern-Greifswald district in Mecklenburg-Vorpommern, Germany. At an elevation of 7.5 m, its surface area is 0.062 km^{2}.
