= Groß Luckow =

- Municipality
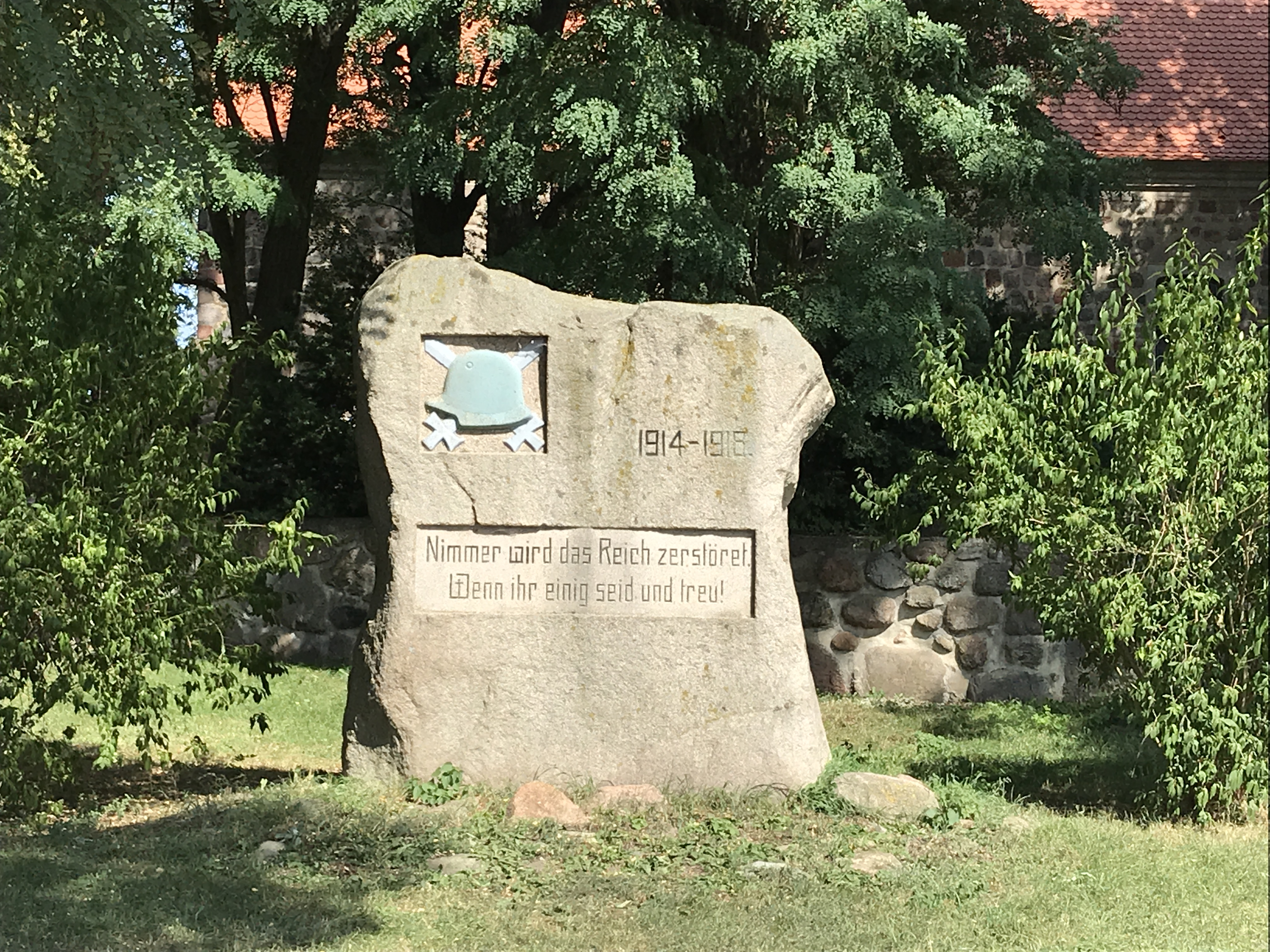
- World War I memorial in Groß Luckow

- Location of Groß Luckow within Vorpommern-Greifswald district
- Interactive map of Groß Luckow
- Location within Germany Location within Mecklenburg-Vorpommern
- Coordinates: 53°32′N 13°50′E
- Country: Germany
- State: Mecklenburg-Vorpommern
- District: Vorpommern-Greifswald
- Municipal assoc.: Uecker-Randow-Tal

Government
  - Mayor: Egon Bölter

Area
  - Total: 8.85 km^{2} (3.42 sq mi)
- Elevation: 48 m (157 ft)

Population (2025-12-31)
  - Total: 181
  - Density: 20.5/km^{2} (53.0/sq mi)
- Time zone: UTC+01:00 (CET)
  - Summer (DST): UTC+02:00 (CEST)
- Postal codes: 17337
- Dialling codes: 039752
- Vehicle registration: VG
- Website: www.amt-uecker-randow-tal.de

Groß Luckow is a municipality in the Vorpommern-Greifswald district, in Mecklenburg-Vorpommern, Germany.

== Politics ==
In the 2025 German federal election, the municipality recorded the highest share of second votes for the AfD in the country at 74.7%.
