= Hanshagen =

- Municipality
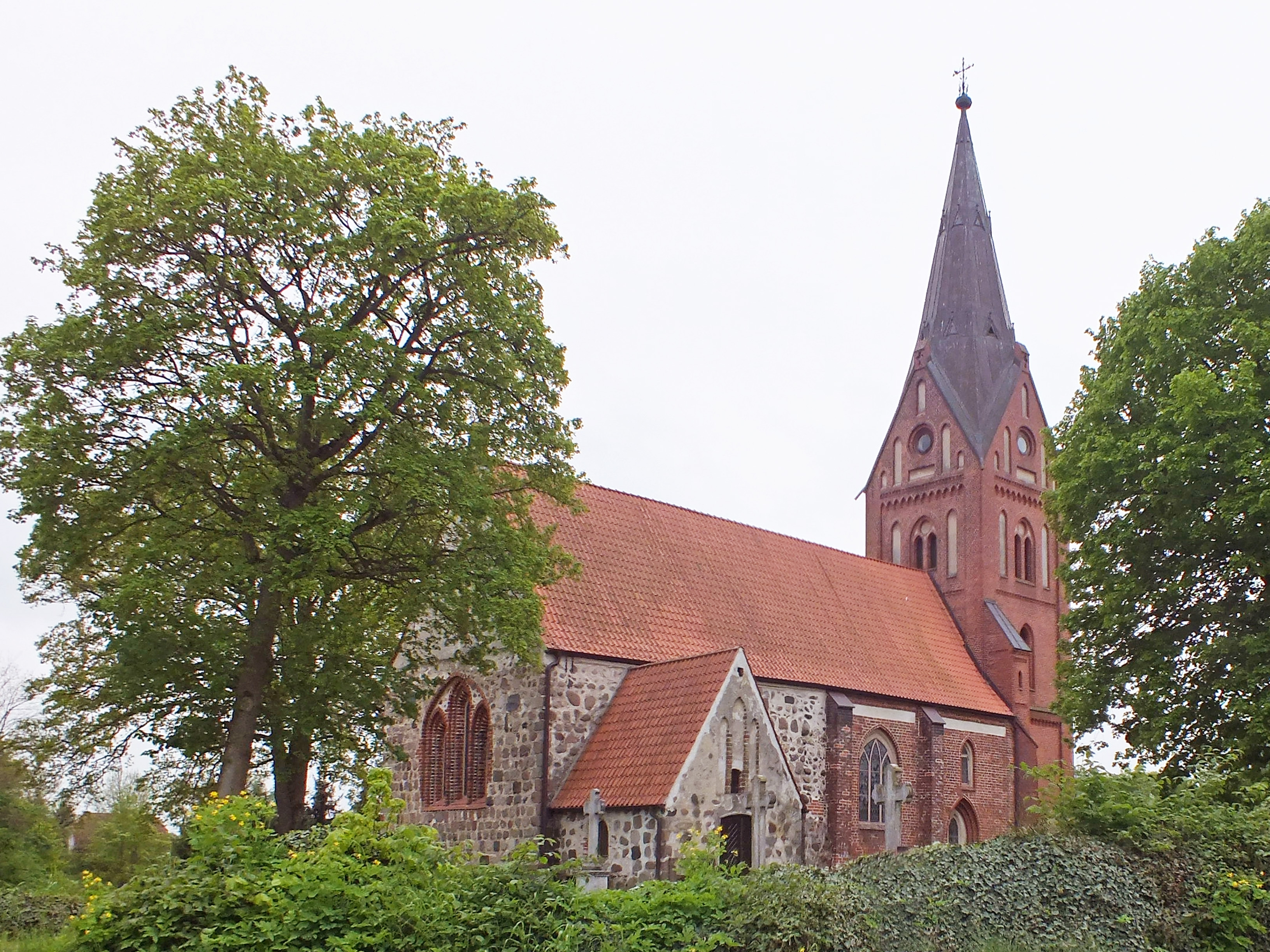
- Medieval village church in Hanshagen

- Coat of arms

- Location of Hanshagen within Vorpommern-Greifswald district
- Interactive map of Hanshagen
- Location within Germany Location within Mecklenburg-Vorpommern
- Coordinates: 54°03′N 13°32′E
- Country: Germany
- State: Mecklenburg-Vorpommern
- District: Vorpommern-Greifswald
- Municipal assoc.: Lubmin

Government
  - Mayor: Michael Harcks

Area
  - Total: 9.64 km^{2} (3.72 sq mi)
- Elevation: 20 m (66 ft)

Population (2025-12-31)
  - Total: 892
  - Density: 92.5/km^{2} (240/sq mi)
- Time zone: UTC+01:00 (CET)
  - Summer (DST): UTC+02:00 (CEST)
- Postal codes: 17509
- Dialling codes: 038352
- Vehicle registration: VG
- Website: www.hanshagen.de

Hanshagen is a municipality in the Vorpommern-Greifswald district, in Mecklenburg-Vorpommern, Germany.
