= Ziethen, Mecklenburg-Vorpommern =

Ziethen
- Municipality
- Location of Ziethen within Vorpommern-Greifswald district
- Interactive map of Ziethen
- Location within Germany Location within Mecklenburg-Vorpommern
- Coordinates: 53°53′N 13°41′E
- Country: Germany
- State: Mecklenburg-Vorpommern
- District: Vorpommern-Greifswald
- Municipal assoc.: Züssow
- Subdivisions: 3

Government
  - Mayor: Eckhard Moede

Area
  - Total: 18.39 km^{2} (7.10 sq mi)
- Elevation: 1 m (3.3 ft)

Population (2025-12-31)
  - Total: 422
  - Density: 22.9/km^{2} (59.4/sq mi)
- Time zone: UTC+01:00 (CET)
  - Summer (DST): UTC+02:00 (CEST)
- Postal codes: 17390
- Dialling codes: 03971
- Vehicle registration: VG
- Website: www.amt-zuessow.de

Ziethen (German pronunciation: [ˈtsiːtn̩]) is a municipality in the Vorpommern-Greifswald district, in Mecklenburg-Vorpommern, Germany.
