= Küchensee =

Lake in Mecklenburg-Vorpommern, Germany

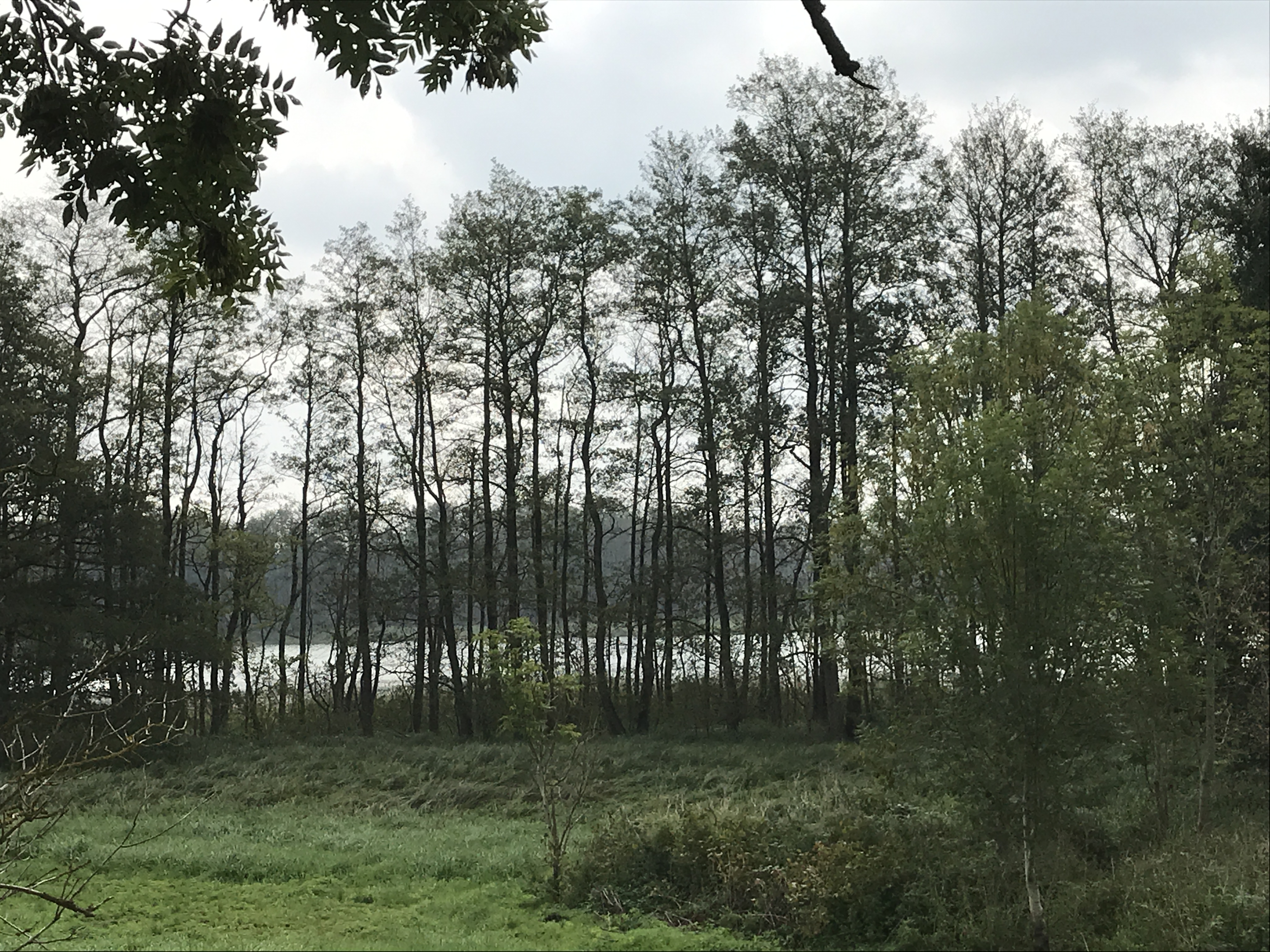

- Location within Mecklenburg-Vorpommern
- Location: Vorpommern-Greifswald, Mecklenburg-Vorpommern
- Coordinates: 53.90607°N 13.73266°E
- Basin countries: Germany
- Surface area: 0.094 km^{2} (0.036 sq mi)
- Surface elevation: 11.6 m (38 ft)

Küchensee is a lake in the Vorpommern-Greifswald district in Mecklenburg-Vorpommern, Germany. At an elevation of 11.6 m, its surface area is 0.094 km^{2}.
