= Peenetal/Loitz =

- Amt
- Location of Peenetal/Loitz within Vorpommern-Greifswald district
- Interactive map of Peenetal/Loitz
- Location within Germany Location within Mecklenburg-Vorpommern
- Coordinates: 53°58′N 13°09′E
- Country: Germany
- State: Mecklenburg-Vorpommern
- District: Vorpommern-Greifswald
- Seat: Loitz
- Subdivisions: 3 municipalities

Area
  - Total: 170.46 km^{2} (65.81 sq mi)

Population (2025-12-31)
  - Total: 5,852
  - Density: 34.33/km^{2} (88.92/sq mi)
- Time zone: UTC+01:00 (CET)
  - Summer (DST): UTC+02:00 (CEST)
- Website: www.loitz.de

Peenetal/Loitz is an Amt in the Vorpommern-Greifswald district, in Mecklenburg-Vorpommern, Germany. The seat of the Amt is in Loitz.

The Amt Peenetal/Loitz consists of the following municipalities:

1. Görmin
2. Loitz
3. Sassen-Trantow
