= Rubkow =

- Municipality
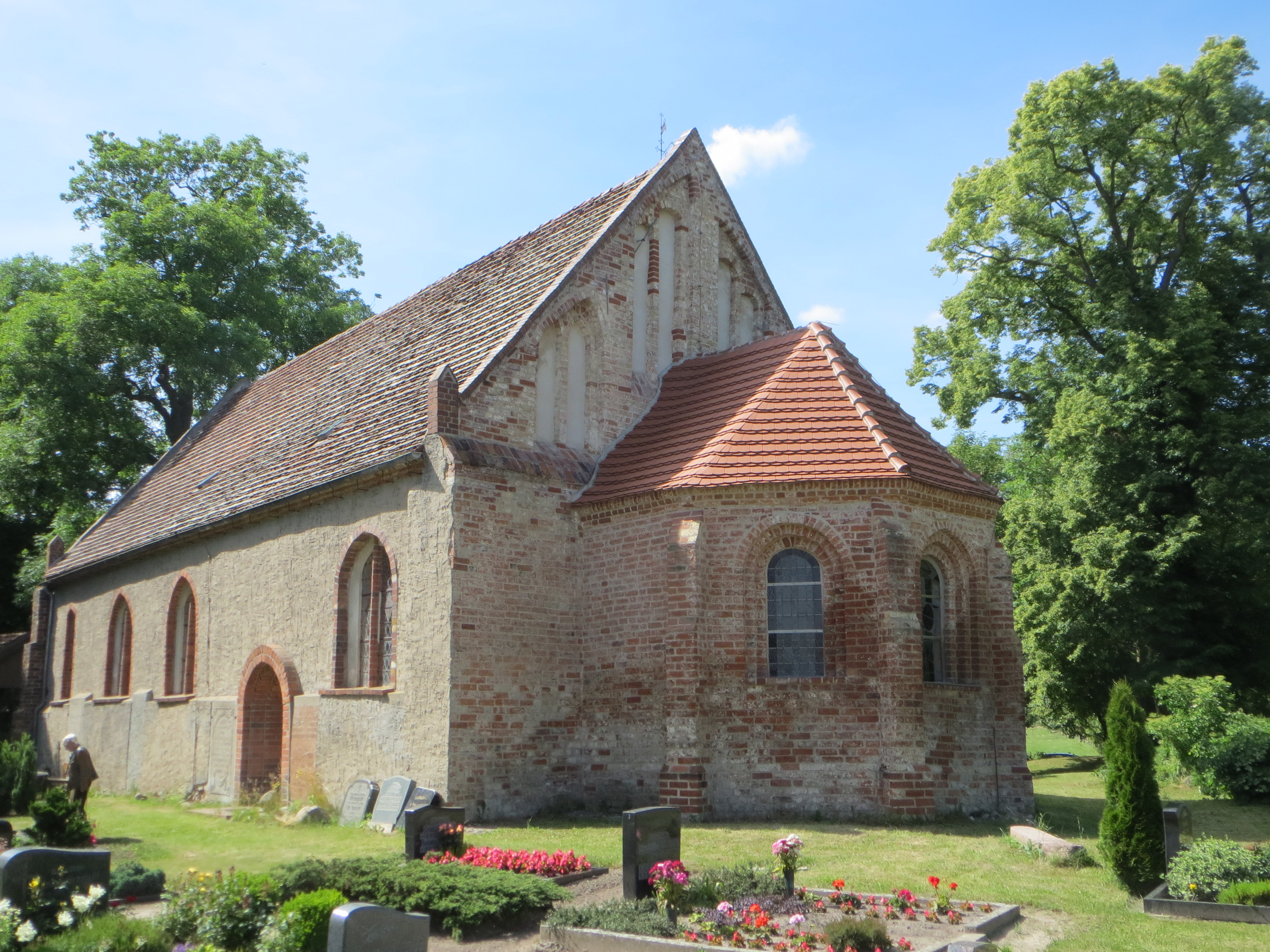
- Village church in Rubkow

- Location of Rubkow within Vorpommern-Greifswald district
- Interactive map of Rubkow
- Location within Germany Location within Mecklenburg-Vorpommern
- Coordinates: 53°56′N 13°43′E
- Country: Germany
- State: Mecklenburg-Vorpommern
- District: Vorpommern-Greifswald
- Municipal assoc.: Züssow
- Subdivisions: 7

Government
  - Mayor: Manfred Höcker

Area
  - Total: 35.02 km^{2} (13.52 sq mi)
- Elevation: 30 m (98 ft)

Population (2025-12-31)
  - Total: 582
  - Density: 16.6/km^{2} (43.0/sq mi)
- Time zone: UTC+01:00 (CET)
  - Summer (DST): UTC+02:00 (CEST)
- Postal codes: 17390
- Dialling codes: 039724
- Vehicle registration: VG

Rubkow is a municipality in the Vorpommern-Greifswald district, in Mecklenburg-Vorpommern, Germany.
