= Groß Polzin =

- Municipality
- Location of Groß Polzin within Vorpommern-Greifswald district
- Interactive map of Groß Polzin
- Location within Germany Location within Mecklenburg-Vorpommern
- Coordinates: 53°54′N 13°36′E
- Country: Germany
- State: Mecklenburg-Vorpommern
- District: Vorpommern-Greifswald
- Municipal assoc.: Züssow
- Subdivisions: 7

Government
  - Mayor: Silvio Grabowski

Area
  - Total: 29.38 km^{2} (11.34 sq mi)
- Elevation: 19 m (62 ft)

Population (2025-12-31)
  - Total: 379
  - Density: 12.9/km^{2} (33.4/sq mi)
- Time zone: UTC+01:00 (CET)
  - Summer (DST): UTC+02:00 (CEST)
- Postal codes: 17390
- Dialling codes: 039724
- Vehicle registration: VG

Groß Polzin is a municipality in the Vorpommern-Greifswald district, in Mecklenburg-Vorpommern, Germany.
