= Lütow =

- Municipality
- Location of Lütow within Vorpommern-Greifswald district
- Interactive map of Lütow
- Location within Germany Location within Mecklenburg-Vorpommern
- Coordinates: 54°01′N 13°53′E
- Country: Germany
- State: Mecklenburg-Vorpommern
- District: Vorpommern-Greifswald
- Municipal assoc.: Am Peenestrom
- Subdivisions: 4

Government
  - Mayor: Heiko Dams

Area
  - Total: 16.3 km^{2} (6.3 sq mi)
- Elevation: 0 m (0 ft)

Population (2025-12-31)
  - Total: 428
  - Density: 26.3/km^{2} (68.0/sq mi)
- Time zone: UTC+01:00 (CET)
  - Summer (DST): UTC+02:00 (CEST)
- Postal codes: 17440
- Dialling codes: 03 8 377
- Vehicle registration: VG
- Website: www.amt-am-peenestrom.de

Lütow is a municipality in the Vorpommern-Greifswald district, in Mecklenburg-Vorpommern, Germany.
