= Dargen =

- Municipality
- Location of Dargen within Vorpommern-Greifswald district
- Interactive map of Dargen
- Location within Germany Location within Mecklenburg-Vorpommern
- Coordinates: 53°53′N 14°04′E
- Country: Germany
- State: Mecklenburg-Vorpommern
- District: Vorpommern-Greifswald
- Municipal assoc.: Usedom-Süd
- Subdivisions: 7

Government
  - Mayor: Detlef Wenzel

Area
  - Total: 28.24 km^{2} (10.90 sq mi)
- Elevation: 1 m (3.3 ft)

Population (2025-12-31)
  - Total: 529
  - Density: 18.7/km^{2} (48.5/sq mi)
- Time zone: UTC+01:00 (CET)
  - Summer (DST): UTC+02:00 (CEST)
- Postal codes: 17419
- Dialling codes: 038376
- Vehicle registration: VG

Dargen is a municipality in the Vorpommern-Greifswald district, in Mecklenburg-Vorpommern, Germany.
