= Sassen-Trantow =

- Municipality
- Location of Sassen-Trantow within Vorpommern-Greifswald district
- Interactive map of Sassen-Trantow
- Location within Germany Location within Mecklenburg-Vorpommern
- Coordinates: 54°00′N 13°11′E
- Country: Germany
- State: Mecklenburg-Vorpommern
- District: Vorpommern-Greifswald
- Municipal assoc.: Peenetal/Loitz
- Subdivisions: 10

Government
  - Mayor: Katrin Eggert

Area
  - Total: 45.22 km^{2} (17.46 sq mi)
- Elevation: 15 m (49 ft)

Population (2025-12-31)
  - Total: 810
  - Density: 18/km^{2} (46/sq mi)
- Time zone: UTC+01:00 (CET)
  - Summer (DST): UTC+02:00 (CEST)
- Postal codes: 17121
- Dialling codes: 039998
- Vehicle registration: DM
- Website: www.loitz.de

Sassen-Trantow is a municipality in the Vorpommern-Greifswald district, in Mecklenburg-Vorpommern, Germany.
