= Zarrenthiner Kiessee =

Lake in Mecklenburg-Vorpommern, Germany

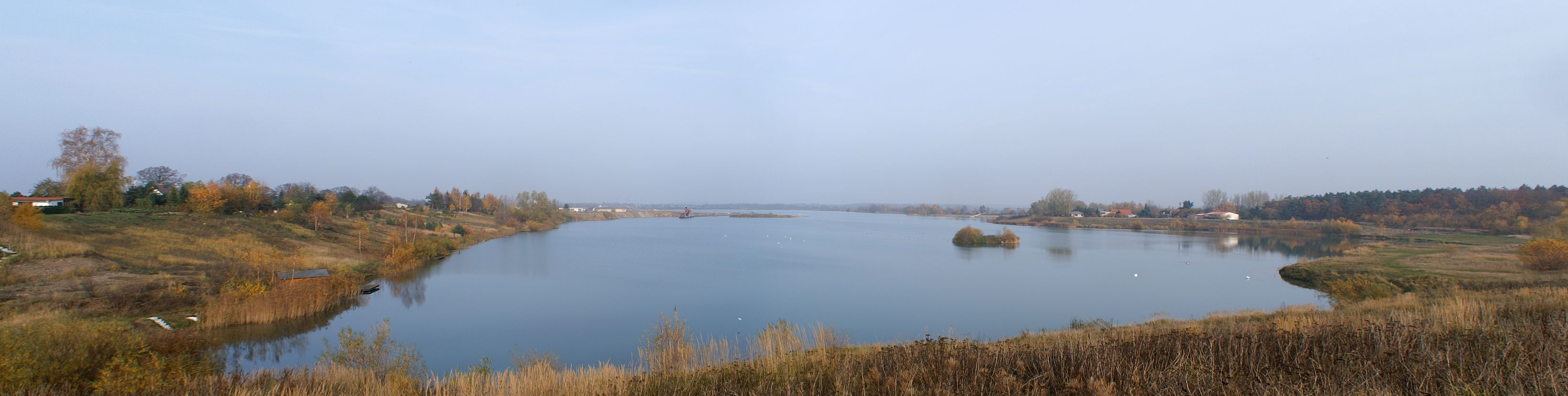
- Zerrenthiner Kiessee Sued

- Location within Germany
- Location: Vorpommern-Greifswald, Mecklenburg-Vorpommern
- Coordinates: 53.931129°N 13.313713°E
- Primary inflows: none
- Primary outflows: none
- Basin countries: Germany
- Max. length: 1,500 m (4,900 ft)
- Max. width: 500 m (1,600 ft)
- Surface area: 0.54 km^{2} (0.21 sq mi)
- Average depth: 14 m (46 ft)
- Max. depth: 22 m (72 ft)
- Surface elevation: 7.2 m (24 ft)

Zarrenthiner Kiessee is a lake in the Vorpommern-Greifswald district in Mecklenburg-Vorpommern, Germany. At an elevation of 7.2 m, its surface area is 0.54 km^{2}.
