= Großer See (Pinnow) =

Lake in Germany

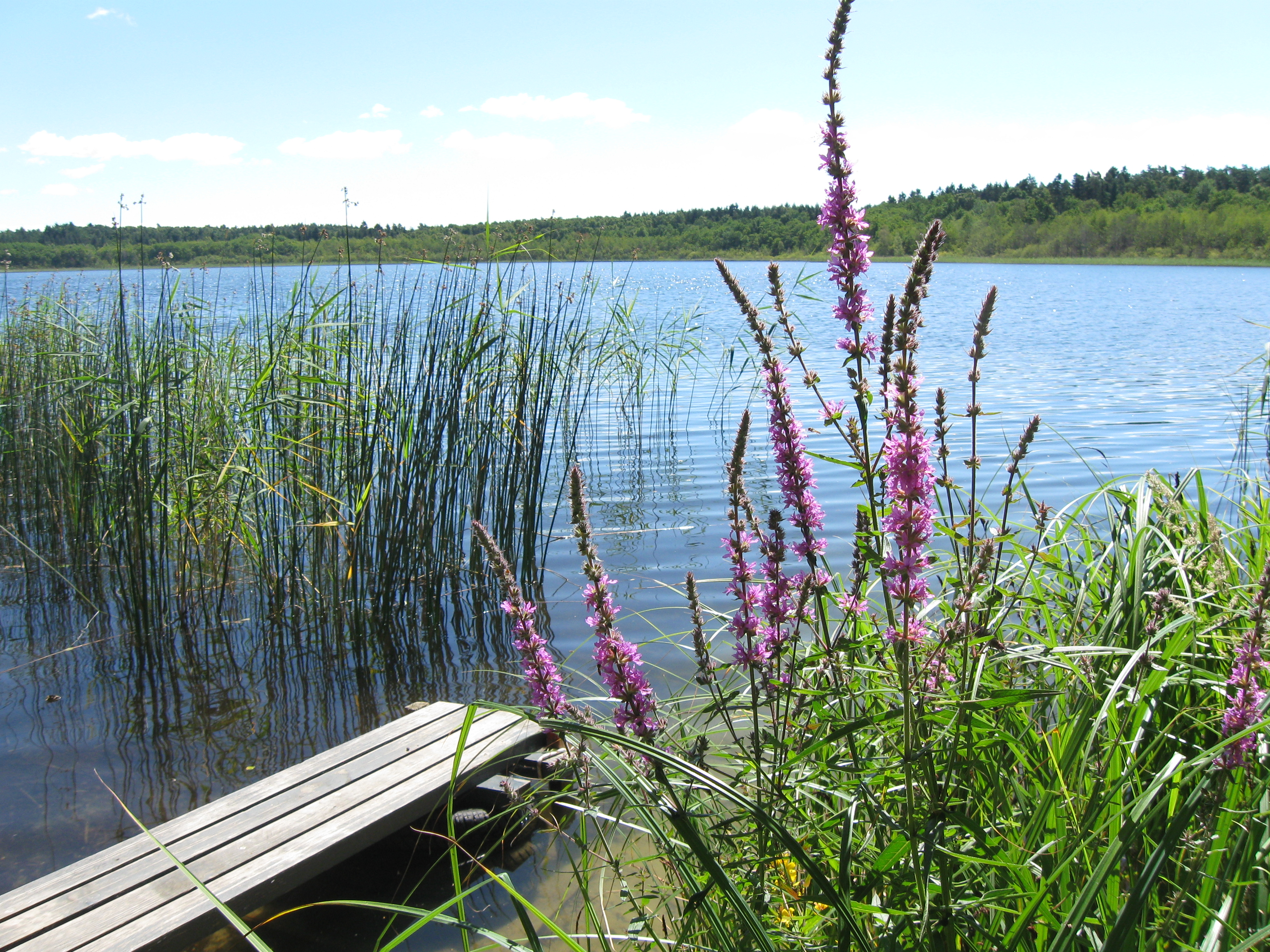

- Location within Mecklenburg-Vorpommern
- Location: Vorpommern-Greifswald, Mecklenburg-Vorpommern
- Coordinates: 53°54′32″N 13°48′40″E
- Basin countries: Germany
- Surface area: 0.64 km^{2} (0.25 sq mi)
- Average depth: 5.4 m (18 ft)
- Max. depth: 15.2 m (50 ft)
- Surface elevation: 10 m (33 ft)

Großer See (Pinnow) is a lake in the Vorpommern-Greifswald district in Mecklenburg-Vorpommern, Germany. At an elevation of 10 m, its surface area is 0.64 km².
