= Hoher See =

Lake in Mecklenburg-Vorpommern, Germany

- Location within Mecklenburg-Vorpommern
- Location: Vorpommern-Greifswald, Mecklenburg-Vorpommern
- Coordinates: 53.99437°N 13.74135°E
- Basin countries: Germany
- Surface area: 0.102 km^{2} (0.039 sq mi)
- Max. depth: 10 m (33 ft)
- Surface elevation: 10.8 m (35 ft)

Hoher See is a lake in the Vorpommern-Greifswald district in Mecklenburg-Vorpommern, Germany. At an elevation of 10.8 m, its surface area is 0.102 km².
