= Papendorf, Uecker-Randow =

Papendorf
- Municipality
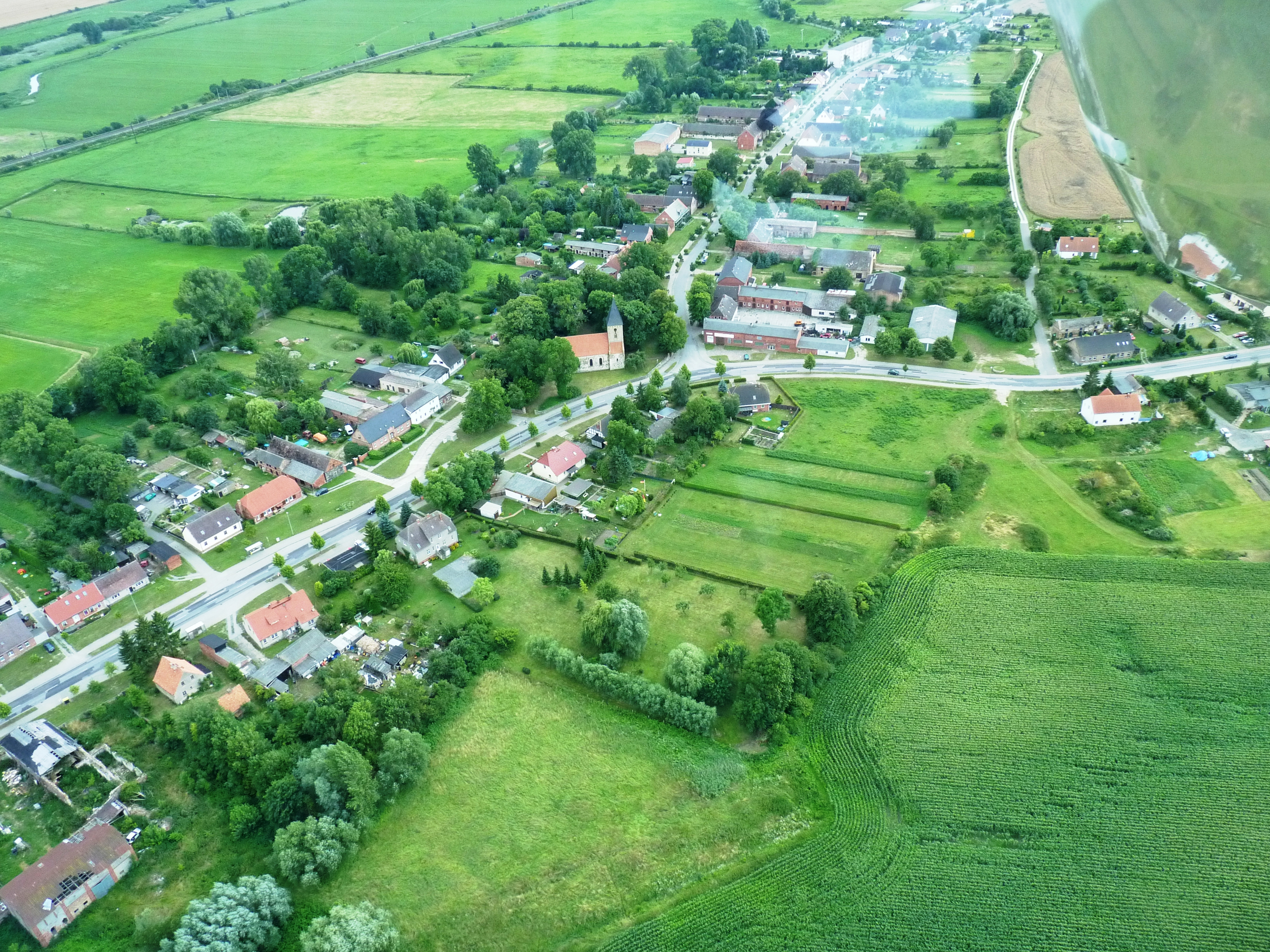
- Aerial view of Papendorf

- Location of Papendorf within Vorpommern-Greifswald district
- Interactive map of Papendorf
- Location within Germany Location within Mecklenburg-Vorpommern
- Coordinates: 53°29′N 13°57′E
- Country: Germany
- State: Mecklenburg-Vorpommern
- District: Vorpommern-Greifswald
- Municipal assoc.: Uecker-Randow-Tal

Government
  - Mayor: Dietmar Großer

Area
  - Total: 10.47 km^{2} (4.04 sq mi)
- Elevation: 20 m (66 ft)

Population (2025-12-31)
  - Total: 212
  - Density: 20.2/km^{2} (52.4/sq mi)
- Time zone: UTC+01:00 (CET)
  - Summer (DST): UTC+02:00 (CEST)
- Postal codes: 17309
- Dialling codes: 03973
- Vehicle registration: VG
- Website: www.amt-uecker-randow-tal.de

Papendorf is a municipality in the Vorpommern-Greifswald district, in Mecklenburg-Vorpommern, Germany.
