= Ludwigshofer See =

Lake in Germany

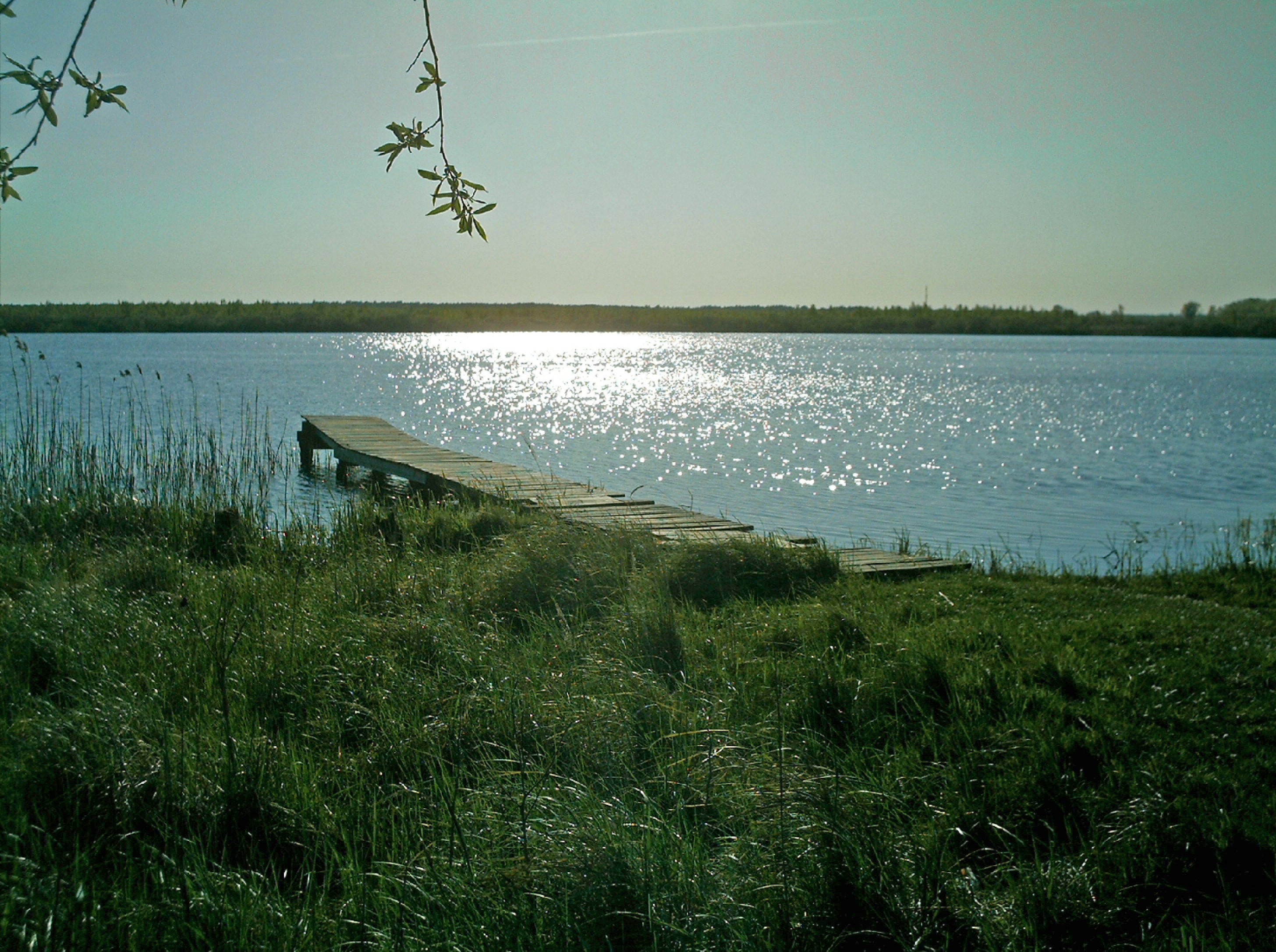

- Location within Mecklenburg-Vorpommern
- Location: Vorpommern-Greifswald, Mecklenburg-Vorpommern
- Coordinates: 53°39′49.55″N 14°13′6.13″E
- Primary outflows: Teufelsgraben zum Neuwarper See
- Basin countries: Germany
- Surface area: 0.18 km^{2} (0.069 sq mi)
- Surface elevation: 2.8 m (9 ft 2 in)

Ludwigshofer See is a lake in the Vorpommern-Greifswald district in Mecklenburg-Vorpommern, Germany. At an elevation of 2.8 m, its surface area is 0.18 km².
