= Vorpommern-Greifswald =

Coordinates: 53°50′N 13°40′E

- District
- Flag Coat of arms
- Country: Germany
- State: Mecklenburg-Vorpommern
- Capital: Greifswald

Government
  - District admin.: Michael Sack (CDU)

Area
  - Total: 3,927 km^{2} (1,516 sq mi)

Population (31 December 2025)
  - Total: 225,867
  - Density: 57.52/km^{2} (149.0/sq mi)
- Time zone: UTC+01:00 (CET)
  - Summer (DST): UTC+02:00 (CEST)
- Vehicle registration: VG, ANK, GW, PW, SBG, UEM, WLG; Greifswald: HGW
- Website: www.kreis-vg.de

Vorpommern-Greifswald is a district in the east of Mecklenburg-Vorpommern, Germany. It is bounded by (from the west and clockwise) the districts of Mecklenburgische Seenplatte and Vorpommern-Rügen, the Baltic Sea, Poland (West Pomeranian Voivodeship) and the state of Brandenburg. The district seat is the University and Hanseatic City of Greifswald. A lake called Berliner See is found in the district.

== History ==
Vorpommern-Greifswald District was established by merging the former districts of Ostvorpommern and Uecker-Randow; along with the subdivisions of Jarmen-Tutow and Peenetal/Loitz (from the former district of Demmin), and the former district-free town Greifswald, as part of the local government reform of September 2011. The name of the district was decided by referendum on 4 September 2011. The project name for the district was Südvorpommern.

== Geography ==
The district has a number of lakes including:

Lake Name	Elevation	Surface Area
Berliner See	7.5 m (25 ft)	0.062 km^{2} (0.024 mi^{2})
Demenzsee	49 m (161 ft)	0.18 km^{2} (0.069 mi^{2})
Großer Mützelburger See	4.5 m (15 ft)	1.14 km^{2} (0.44 mi^{2})
Großer See (Pinnow)	10 m (33 ft)	0.64 km^{2} (0.25 mi^{2})
Hoher See	10.8 m (35 ft)	0.102 km^{2} (0.039 mi^{2})
Küchensee	11.6 m (38 ft)	0.094 km^{2} (0.036 mi^{2})
Ludwigshofer See	2.8 m (9.2 ft)	0.18 km^{2} (0.069 mi^{2})
Pulower See	10.9 m (36 ft)	0.103 km^{2} (0.040 mi^{2})
Putzarer See	7.3 m (24 ft)	1.68 km^{2} (0.65 mi^{2})
Schloßsee	−0.5 m (−1.6 ft)	0.1 km^{2} (0.039 mi^{2})
Straßensee	10.9 m (36 ft)	0.131 km^{2} (0.051 mi^{2})
Zarrenthiner Kiessee	7.2 m (24 ft)	0.54 km^{2} (0.21 mi^{2})

The island of Usedom within the district also has a number of lakes.

== Towns and municipalities ==
Map of municipalities and towns in Vorpommern-Greifswald

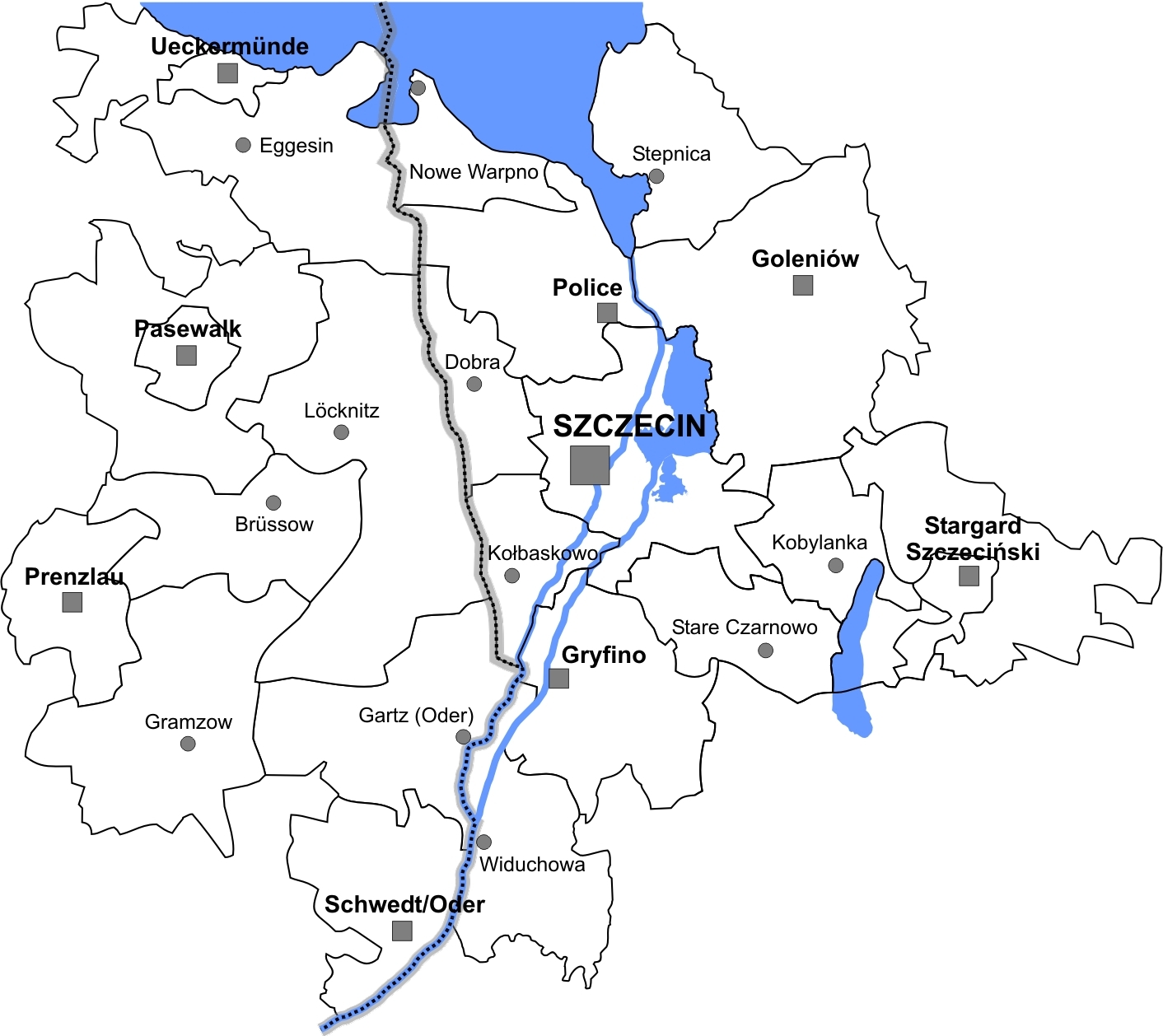
The Szczecin agglomeration includes various municipalities in Vorpommern-Greifswald

Amt-free towns
1. Anklam
2. Greifswald
3. Pasewalk
4. Strasburg
5. Ueckermünde
Amt-free municipalities
1. Heringsdorf

Ämter
1. Am Peenestrom; 1. Buggenhagen; 2. Krummin; 3. Lassan^{2}; 4. Lütow; 5. Sauzin; 6. Wolgast^{1, 2}; 7. Zemitz; 2. Am Stettiner Haff; 1. Ahlbeck; 2. Altwarp; 3. Eggesin^{1, 2}; 4. Grambin; 5. Hintersee; 6. Leopoldshagen; 7. Liepgarten; 8. Lübs; 9. Luckow; 10. Meiersberg; 11. Mönkebude; 12. Vogelsang-Warsin; 3. Anklam-Land; 1. Bargischow; 2. Blesewitz; 3. Boldekow; 4. Bugewitz; 5. Butzow; 6. Ducherow; 7. Iven; 8. Krien; 9. Krusenfelde; 10. Medow; 11. Neetzow-Liepen; 12. Neu Kosenow; 13. Neuenkirchen; 14. Postlow; 15. Rossin; 16. Sarnow; 17. Spantekow^{1}; 18. Stolpe an der Peene	4. Jarmen-Tutow; 1. Alt Tellin; 2. Bentzin; 3. Daberkow; 4. Jarmen^{1, 2}; 5. Kruckow; 6. Tutow; 7. Völschow; 5. Landhagen; 1. Behrenhoff; 2. Dargelin; 3. Dersekow; 4. Hinrichshagen; 5. Levenhagen; 6. Mesekenhagen; 7. Neuenkirchen^{1}; 8. Wackerow; 9. Weitenhagen; 6. Löcknitz-Penkun; 1. Bergholz; 2. Blankensee; 3. Boock; 4. Glasow; 5. Grambow; 6. Krackow; 7. Löcknitz^{1}; 8. Nadrensee; 9. Penkun^{2}; 10. Plöwen; 11. Ramin; 12. Rossow; 13. Rothenklempenow; 7. Lubmin; 1. Brünzow; 2. Hanshagen; 3. Katzow; 4. Kemnitz; 5. Kröslin; 6. Loissin; 7. Lubmin^{1}; 8. Neu Boltenhagen; 9. Rubenow; 10. Wusterhusen	8. Peenetal/Loitz; 1. Görmin; 2. Loitz^{1, 2}; 3. Sassen-Trantow; 9. Torgelow-Ferdinandshof; 1. Altwigshagen; 2. Ferdinandshof; 3. Hammer an der Uecker; 4. Heinrichswalde; 5. Rothemühl; 6. Torgelow^{1, 2}; 7. Wilhelmsburg; 10. Uecker-Randow-Tal [seat: Pasewalk]; 1. Brietzig; 2. Fahrenwalde; 3. Groß Luckow; 4. Jatznick; 5. Koblentz; 6. Krugsdorf; 7. Nieden; 8. Papendorf; 9. Polzow; 10. Rollwitz; 11. Schönwalde; 12. Viereck; 13. Zerrenthin; 11. Usedom-Nord; 1. Karlshagen; 2. Mölschow; 3. Peenemünde; 4. Trassenheide; 5. Zinnowitz^{1}	12. Usedom-Süd; 1. Benz; 2. Dargen; 3. Garz; 4. Kamminke; 5. Korswandt; 6. Koserow; 7. Loddin; 8. Mellenthin; 9. Pudagla; 10. Rankwitz; 11. Stolpe auf Usedom; 12. Ückeritz; 13. Usedom^{1, 2}; 14. Zempin; 15. Zirchow; 13. Züssow; 1. Bandelin; 2. Gribow; 3. Groß Kiesow; 4. Groß Polzin; 5. Gützkow^{2}; 6. Karlsburg; 7. Klein Bünzow; 8. Murchin; 9. Rubkow; 10. Schmatzin; 11. Wrangelsburg; 12. Ziethen; 13. Züssow^{1}
^{1}seat of the Amt; ^{2}town
