= Uecker-Randow =

Coordinates: 53°35′N 14°00′E

- District
- Coat of arms

- Country: Germany
- State: Mecklenburg-Vorpommern
- Founded: 1994
- Disbanded: 2011
- Capital: Pasewalk

Area
  - Total: 1,635 km^{2} (631 sq mi)

Population (2010)
  - Total: 72,137
  - Density: 44.12/km^{2} (114.3/sq mi)
- Time zone: UTC+01:00 (CET)
  - Summer (DST): UTC+02:00 (CEST)
- Vehicle registration: UER

Uecker-Randow was a Kreis (district) in the eastern part of Mecklenburg-Western Pomerania, Germany. Neighboring districts were (from south clockwise) Uckermark in Brandenburg, Mecklenburg-Strelitz and Ostvorpommern. To the east was the West Pomeranian Voivodship of Poland.

== History ==
The Uecker-Randow District was established on 12 June 1994 by merging the previous districts of Pasewalk and Ueckermünde, along with part of the district of Strasburg. On 4 September 2011, it was merged into Vorpommern-Greifswald.

== Coat of arms ==
The coat of arms showed a griffin to the left and an eagle to the right. The griffin is the symbol of Pommern, while the eagle is the symbol of Brandenburg. Historically the territory of the district was divided between these two states. The tower in the middle represents a large tower in Pasewalk, the capital of the district. The wavy lines in bottom stand both for the two main rivers which gave the district its name, as well as for the Oder Lagoon of the Baltic Sea.

== Towns and municipalities ==
The subdivisions of the district were (situation August 2011):

Amt-free towns
1. Pasewalk
2. Strasburg
3. Ueckermünde

Ämter
1. Am Stettiner Haff; 1. Ahlbeck; 2. Altwarp; 3. Eggesin^{1, 2}; 4. Grambin; 5. Hintersee; 6. Leopoldshagen; 7. Liepgarten; 8. Lübs; 9. Luckow; 10. Meiersberg; 11. Mönkebude; 12. Torgelow-Holländerei^{3}; 13. Vogelsang-Warsin	2. Löcknitz-Penkun; 1. Bergholz; 2. Blankensee; 3. Boock; 4. Glasow; 5. Grambow; 6. Krackow; 7. Löcknitz^{1}; 8. Nadrensee; 9. Penkun^{2}; 10. Plöwen; 11. Ramin; 12. Rossow; 13. Rothenklempenow; 3. Torgelow-Ferdinandshof; 1. Altwigshagen; 2. Ferdinandshof; 3. Hammer an der Uecker; 4. Heinrichsruh^{3}; 5. Heinrichswalde; 6. Rothemühl; 7. Torgelow^{1, 2}; 8. Wilhelmsburg	4. Uecker-Randow-Tal [seat: Pasewalk]; 1. Blumenhagen^{3}; 2. Brietzig; 3. Damerow^{3}; 4. Fahrenwalde; 5. Groß Luckow; 6. Jatznick; 7. Klein Luckow^{3}; 8. Koblentz; 9. Krugsdorf; 10. Nieden; 11. Papendorf; 12. Polzow; 13. Rollwitz; 14. Schönwalde; 15. Viereck; 16. Zerrenthin; 17. Züsedom^{3}
^{1} - seat of the Amt; ^{2} - town; ^{3} - former town/municipality
