= Löcknitz =

- Municipality
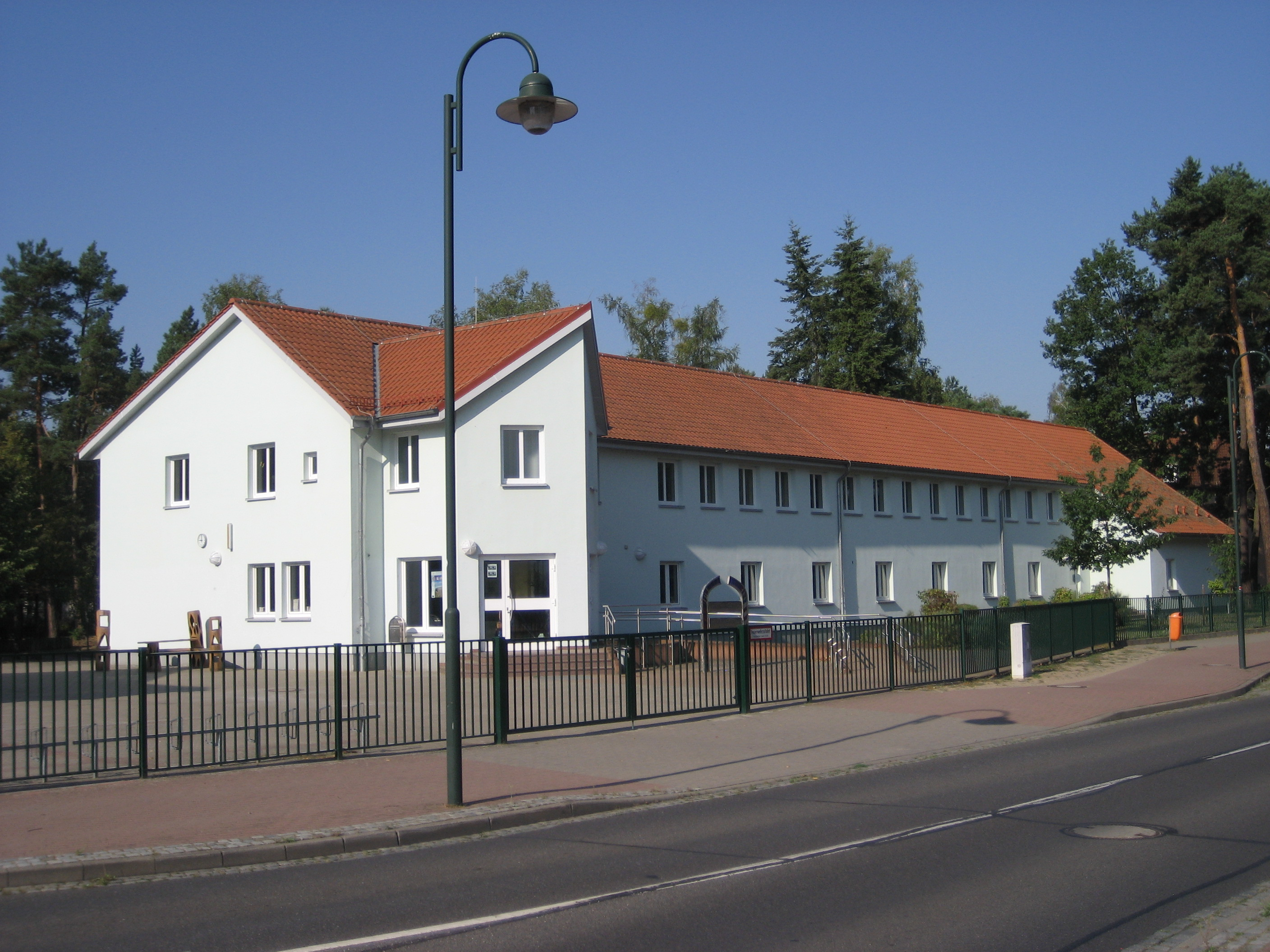
- Bilingual German-Polish school in Löcknitz

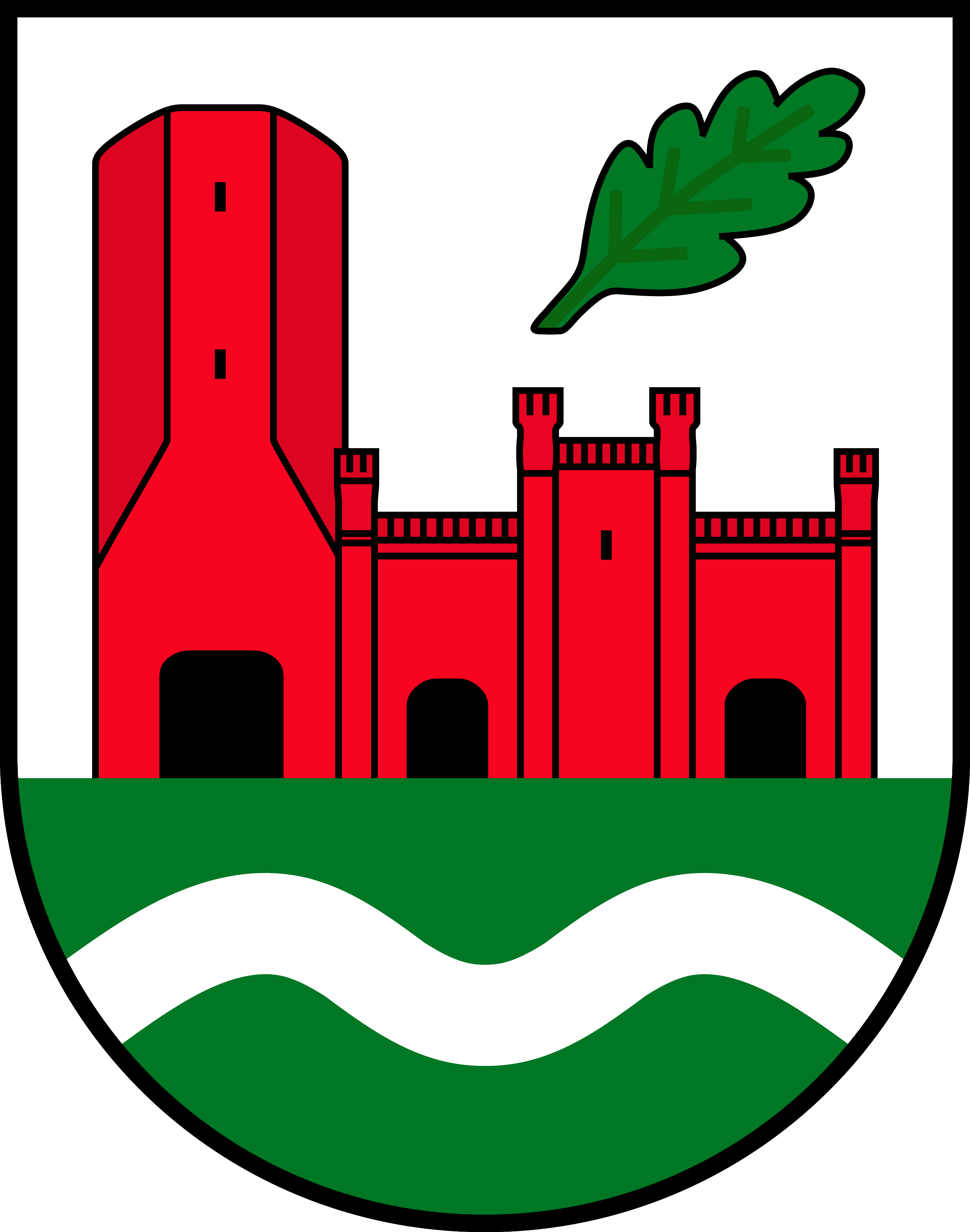
- Coat of arms

- Location of Löcknitz within Vorpommern-Greifswald district
- Interactive map of Löcknitz
- Location within Germany Location within Mecklenburg-Vorpommern
- Coordinates: 53°27′N 14°12′E
- Country: Germany
- State: Mecklenburg-Vorpommern
- District: Vorpommern-Greifswald
- Municipal assoc.: Löcknitz-Penkun

Government
  - Mayor: Detlef Ebert (CDU)

Area
  - Total: 22.8 km^{2} (8.8 sq mi)
- Elevation: 34 m (112 ft)

Population (2025-12-31)
  - Total: 3,252
  - Density: 143/km^{2} (369/sq mi)
- Time zone: UTC+01:00 (CET)
  - Summer (DST): UTC+02:00 (CEST)
- Postal codes: 17321
- Dialling codes: 039754
- Vehicle registration: VG
- Website: https://loecknitz.eu/

Löcknitz (German pronunciation: [ˈlœknɪts]) is a municipality in the Vorpommern-Greifswald district, in Mecklenburg-Vorpommern, in north-eastern Germany, located in the historic region of Pomerania, 12 km (7 mi) west of the German-Polish border and 25 km (16 mi) west of Szczecin. It is the seat of the Amt Löcknitz-Penkun.

== Geography ==
Löcknitz lies within the Western Pomerania (Vorpommern) part of Mecklenburg-Vorpommern, and thus the historic region of Pomerania. The river Randow flows through the municipality, specifically along the south and east of the main town. The Löcknitzer See lies south east to the town.

Löcknitz is located 12 km (7 mi) west of the German-Polish border, 25 km (16 mi) west of Szczecin, and 14 km (9 mi) east of Pasewalk, the closest German town.

Administratively, the municipality is a part of the Amt Löcknitz-Penkun, of which it is the seat, within the Vorpommern-Greifswald district.

== History ==
Löcknitz is located in the area of the former Urstromtal which formed roughly 20,000 years BC, which formed as the glacial masses of the Ice age retreated from the region. Ancient graves and artifacts found in the area date back to the Stone Ages. Around 600 years BC, the area of what is today Löcknitz was settled by the Ukrani Slavs in the void left by the retreating Germanic tribes. The name, which is of Slavic origin, likely evolved out of either the word "Locheniza" or "Lokenitz", roughly translating to "ditch depression" or "swamp hole".

Löcknitz was first mentioned in 1212. Around that time, the Slavic gord Lokenitza was constructed of wood and posts. Said fort would be taken over by the Germans around the year 1400 and be converted into a castle of masonry named Castrum Locenize. The castle governed not only the settlement it stood in, but also the fields, woods, and settlements (Plöwen, Bismark, Bergholz) surrounding it.

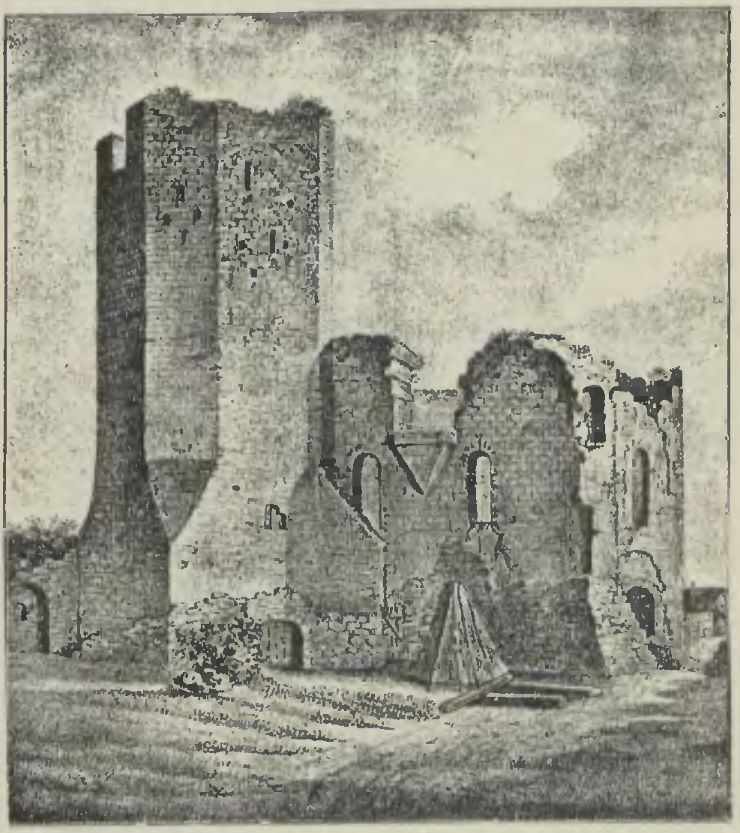
Ruins of the Löcknitz castle (1842)

During the final stages of World War II, on 10 February 1945, Salzow (present district) was the site of a stopover during the German-organised march of some 6,000 Polish prisoners of war from the Oflag II-D camp headed westwards.

=== Administrative timeline ===
Due to being located on the border between Pomerania and Brandenburg, Löcknitz was very contested and was frequently involved in battles as well as border changes.

- until 1250, Duchy of Pomerania
- 1250–1390, Margraviate of Brandenburg
- 1390–1468, Duchy of Pomerania-Stettin
- 1468–1648, Uckermark, Margraviate of Brandenburg
- 1648–1676, Swedish Pomerania
- 1676–1700, Uckermark, Margraviate of Brandenburg
- 1700–1720, Swedish Pomerania
- 1720–1815, Uckermark, Margraviate of Brandenburg
- 1815–1871, Province of Pomerania, Kingdom of Prussia
- 1871–1918, Province of Pomerania, Kingdom of Prussia, German Empire
- 1918–1933, Province of Pomerania, Free State of Prussia, Weimar Republic
- 1933–1945, Province of Pomerania, Free State of Prussia, Nazi Germany
- 1945–1952, Land Mecklenburg, East Germany
- 1952–1990, Bezirk Neubrandenburg, East Germany
- since 1990, Mecklenburg-Vorpommern, Germany

=== Cross-border contacts ===
Since 1992 the bilingual German-Polish Gymnasium is visited by pupils from Germany (526 in 2008) and Poland (161), leading to the German Abitur as well as to the Polish matura. In 2008 the certificates were handed over by the foreign ministers of both countries Frank-Walter Steinmeier and Radosław Sikorski. Since Poland joined the Schengen Agreement, the population of Löcknitz has been growing, as rates and costs of land acquisition are lower than in Poland. Many commuters to Szczecin live in Löcknitz and the first economic investments were made in Löcknitz by Polish enterprises, supported by the Löcknitz administration. As of 2019, the town's population was 15% Polish.

== Demographics ==
The population of Löcknitz is 3,253 as of 2019.

Historical population

Year	Pop.	±%
1990	3,699	—
1991	3,636	−1.7%
1992	3,576	−1.7%
1993	3,502	−2.1%
1994	3,457	−1.3%
1995	3,413	−1.3%
1996	3,398	−0.4%
1997	3,292	−3.1%
1998	3,261	−0.9%
1999	3,187	−2.3%
2000	3,195	+0.3%
2001	3,160	−1.1%
2002	3,083	−2.4%
2003	3,000	−2.7%
2004	2,939	−2.0%

Year	Pop.	±%
2005	2,904	−1.2%
2006	2,948	+1.5%
2007	3,021	+2.5%
2008	3,059	+1.3%
2009	3,027	−1.0%
2010	3,021	−0.2%
2011	3,093	+2.4%
2012	3,142	+1.6%
2013	3,166	+0.8%
2014	3,196	+0.9%
2015	3,192	−0.1%
2016	3,090	−3.2%
2017	3,178	+2.8%
2018	3,223	+1.4%
2019	3,253	+0.9%

Sources: Einwohnerzahlen

As a result of the Schengen Agreement, 15% (around 495 people) and 250 pupils (around half) in the town were Polish as of 2019. In 2012, Poles made up only 7% of the population.

== Politics ==
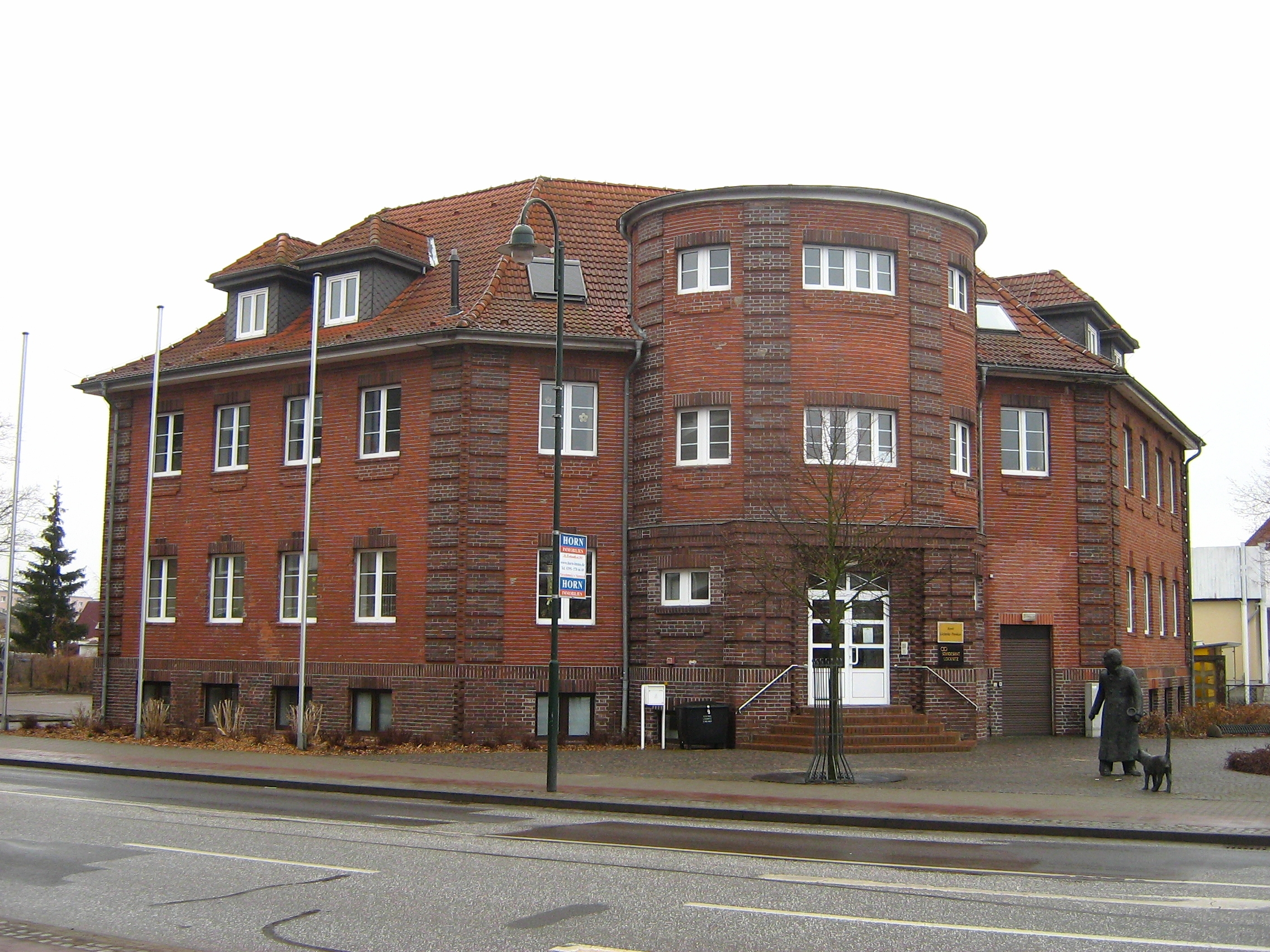
Löcknitz town hall

The current mayor of Löcknitz is Detlef Ebert (CDU). Ebert ran in the 2019 mayoral elections unopposed and received 1003 (78.6%) yes votes. The municipal council consists of 13 members (12 CDU, 1 AfD) elected on the same date.

=== Elections ===
The last municipal election took place on 26 May 2019. 13 members were elected to the council.

Candidate	Party	Votes	%	+/-	Seats	+/-
Detlef Ebert	Christian Democratic Union of Germany (CDU)	3,081	81.6	▲41.7	12	▲4
Sören Schütz	Alternative for Germany (AfD)	519	13.8	New	1	▲1
?	Independent	174	4.6	New	0	±0
Valid votes		3,774	98.6	▼28.43		
Invalid votes		53	1.4%	▼56.91		
Electorate/voter turnout		1359	50.7	▲1.1		
Source: Kommunalwahlen in Mecklenburg-Vorpommern am 26. Mai 2019

The following candidates were elected:

- Detlef Ebert (CDU), Mayor
- Lutz-Michael Liskow (CDU), First deputy mayor
- Bernd Dassow (CDU), Second deputy mayor
- Sven Reinke (CDU)
- Anja Holke (CDU)
- Tina Peschke (CDU)
- Janette Haase (CDU)
- Anja Guderjan (CDU)
- Katarzyna Werth (CDU)
- Enrico Harms (CDU)
- Thomas Kuckuck (CDU)
- Matthias Mochow (CDU)
- Jürgen Reichert (CDU)
- Sören Schütz (AfD)

==== Historical seat distribution ====
Year	CDU	LEFT	NPD	AfD	SPD	WG BV-LR (Note: Voters' Association Farmers' Union - Rural areas (Wählergemeinschaft Bauernverband-Ländlicher Raum).)	Source
2019	12	—	—	1	—	—	
2014	8	3	2	—	—	1	
2009	6	5	2	—	1	—	

==== Mayoral elections ====
The last mayoral election happened on 26 May 2019, the same day as the municipal council election. Only one candidate, Detlef Ebert (CDU), was up for election and ran unopposed. The results are as follows:

Party	Candidate	Yes		No	
Party	Candidate	Votes	%	Votes	%
CDU	Detlef Ebert	1003	78.6	273	21,4

==== Other elections ====
Löcknitz is part of the Mecklenburgische Seenplatte I – Vorpommern-Greifswald II federal electoral constituency and is represented by Erik von Malottki (SPD), elected during the 2021 federal election.

=== Nationalism and Neo-Nazism in Löcknitz ===
The mass immigration of Poles into Löcknitz has also caused some problems and gave rise to an anti-Polish sentiment as well as German nationalism in the town. For instance, there have been incidents of Polish license plates being vandalized.

The far-right National Democratic Party of Germany has enjoyed some popularity in the town, holding two seats in the municipal council between 2009 and 2019. The NPD played into anti-Polish sentiments by displaying the slogan "Stop the Polish invasion!" (German: "Poleninvasion stoppen!") on posters in the village during the 2009 election. In June 2011, a 20-meter long inscription, attributed to the NPD, appeared in the town with the text "Poles out. Germany for the Germans".

In 2020, the police closed down a facility in Löcknitz where neo-Nazis had combined several garages into a single large hall which was used as a meeting place as well as for the organisation of far-right concerts, which up to 200 people attended. The hall was closed due to building code/ zoning violations and a large bonfire that was spotted at the building. During the search, the owners resisted the police, which resulted in three officers being injured.

Dirk Bahlmann (NPD), who used to be a member of the municipal council, is recognized as the leader of neo-Nazi activities in the town. Allegedly there exists a group of 20 to 25 neo-Nazis around Bahlmann named "Nationales Bündnis Löcknitz" (National Association Löcknitz) which organizes far-right activities in the town. Several worn-out posters of the NPD's youth wing JN are glued to an advertising column in front of the train station.

== Notable people ==
- Iwan (Yitzhak) Salomon (1881–1972), Jewish philanthropist and communal leader
- Viktor Bauer (1915–1969), Luftwaffe officer during World War II
- Manfred Ewald (1926–2002), SED politician in the GDR

== Twin towns ==
- (Germany) Sassenberg, North Rhine-Westphalia
- Stare Czarnowo, Poland
