= Wietstock =

- Ortsteil of Altwigshagen
- Interactive map of Wietstock
- Location within Germany Location within Mecklenburg-Vorpommern
- Coordinates: 53°43′N 13°47′E
- Country: Germany
- State: Mecklenburg-Vorpommern
- District: Vorpommern-Greifswald
- Municipality: Altwigshagen

Area
  - Total: 10.85 km^{2} (4.19 sq mi)
- Elevation: 7 m (23 ft)

Population (2009-12-31)
  - Total: 145
  - Density: 13.4/km^{2} (34.6/sq mi)
- Time zone: UTC+01:00 (CET)
  - Summer (DST): UTC+02:00 (CEST)
- Postal codes: 17379
- Dialling codes: 039777
- Vehicle registration: UER

Wietstock is a village in the Vorpommern-Greifswald district, in Mecklenburg-Vorpommern, Germany. It is part of the municipality Altwigshagen. Before 1 January 2011, it was an independent municipality.

== History ==
From 1648 to 1720, Wietstock was part of Swedish Pomerania. From 1720 to 1945, it was part of the Prussian Province of Pomerania, from 1945 to 1952 of the State of Mecklenburg-Vorpommern, from 1952 to 1990 of the Bezirk Neubrandenburg of East Germany and since 1990 again of Mecklenburg-Vorpommern.
