= Storkow =

Storkow may refer to:

- Storkow, Brandenburg, Germany, a town
  - Storkow (Mark) station, a railway station
  - Storkow Castle
- Storkow, Mecklenburg-Vorpommern, Germany, location of a windmill in Mecklenburg-Vorpommern
