= List of windmills in Mecklenburg-Vorpommern =

A list of windmills in the German state of Mecklenburg-Vorpommern.

Location	Name of mill	Type	Built	Notes	Photograph
Altenhagen		Paltrockmühle		Zwillingswindmuehlen (German)	
Altensien	Schrotmühle	Bockwindmühle			
Altkalen		Sockelgeschossholländer	1913	Muehlen Archiv (German)	
Alt Schwerin		Erdholländer		Muehlen Archiv (German)	
Alt Tellin		Galerieholländer		Muehlen Archiv (German)	
Altwarp		Sockelgeschossholländer		Muehlen Archiv (German)	
Anklam		Galerieholländer		House conversion Muehlen Archiv (German)	
Bad Sülze		Sockelgeschossholländer		Muehlen Archiv (German)	
Bad Sülze		Turmholländer		Muehlen Archiv (German)	
Bansin		Sockelgeschossholländer		Muehlen Archiv (German)	
Banzkow	Banzkower Mühle	Galerieholländer		Muehlen Archiv (German)	
Benz		Erdholländer		Muehlen Archiv (German)	
Besitz		Sockelgeschossholländer		Muehlen Archiv (German)	
Blankenhagen		Galerieholländer	c1890	House conversion Muehlen Archiv (German); Zwillingswindmuehlen (German)	
Blankenhagen	Restmühle	Sockelgeschossholländer	c1860	Converted to observatory Muehlen Archiv (German); Zwillingswindmuehlen (German)	
Boock		Turmholländer		Muehlen Archiv (German)	
Born		Sockelgeschossholländer		Muehlen Archiv (German)	
Carwitz		Sockelgeschossholländer		Muehlen Archiv (German)	
Dabel		Galerieholländer		Muehlen Archiv (German)	
Dambeck		Erdholländer		Muehlen Archiv (German)	
Dargun		Sockelgeschossholländer		House conversion Muehlen Archiv (German)	
Demmin		Sockelgeschossholländer		Muehlen Archiv (German)	
Dorf Mecklenburg		Sockelgeschossholländer		Muehlen Archiv (German)	
Eggerow		Erdholländer		House conversion Muehlen Archiv (German)	
Fahrenwalde		Erdholländer		Muehlen Archiv (German)	
Farpen		Sockelgeschossholländer		Base only Muehlen Archiv (German)	
Friedland		Sockelgeschossholländer		Muehlen Archiv (German)	
Friedland		Turmholländer		Muehlen Archiv (German)	
Gaarzer Mühle		Erdholländer		House conversion Muehlen Archiv (German)	
Gallin		Galerieholländer		Muehlen Archiv (German)	
Gnoien		Sockelgeschossholländer		Converted to restaurant Muehlen Archiv (German)	
Goldberg		Galerieholländer		Muehlen Archiv (German)	
Goldenbow		Galerieholländer		Muehlen Archiv (German)	
Gotthun		Sockelgeschossholländer		Muehlen Archiv (German)	
Graal-Müritz	Mühle Graal	Galerieholländer	c1860	House conversion Muehlen Archiv (German); Zwillingswindmuehlen (German)	
Grebbin		Sockelgeschossholländer		Muehlen Archiv (German)	
Greifswald-Eldena		Bockwindmühle		Trestle only Muehlen Archiv (German)	
Grevenstein		Sockelgeschossholländer		Converted to watchtower Muehlen Archiv (German)	
Grevesmühlen		Galerieholländer		Muehlen Archiv (German)	
Gristow		Erdholländer		Muehlen Archiv (German)	
Großlantow		Sockelgeschossholländer		House conversion Muehlen Archiv (German)	
Hasselförde		Turmholländer		Muehlen Archiv (German)	
Heinrichswalde		Sockelgeschossholländer		House conversion Muehlen Archiv (German)	
Japenzin-Rehberg		Sockelgeschossholländer		Incorporated into engine driven mill Muehlen Archiv (German)	
Kamminke		Turmholländer		Muehlen Archiv (German)	
Kessin				Ruin; Zwillingswindmuehlen (German)	
Kladrun		Sockelgeschossholländer		Base only, house conversion Muehlen Archiv (German)	
Klein Ernsthof		Erdholländer		Muehlen Archiv (German)	
Klein Grenz				Monument; Zwillingswindmuehlen (German)	
Klein Wardow		Sockelgeschossholländer		Muehlen Archiv (German)	
Klockenhagen		Bockwindmühle		Restored; Muehlen Archiv (German)	
Klütz		Galerieholländer		Muehlen Archiv (German)	
Kröpelin	Mühle Niemann	Sockelgeschossholländer	1876	House conversion Muehlen Archiv (German); Zwillingswindmuehlen (German)	
Kröpelin	Versenkbare Mühle	Galerieholländer	1904	House conversion Muehlen Archiv (German); Zwillingswindmuehlen (German)	
Kühlungsborn	Brunshövener Mühle	Sockelgeschossholländer	1875	Muehlen Archiv (German); Zwillingswindmuehlen (German)	
Kummer		Turmholländer		Was incorporated into engine driven mill, now house converted Muehlen Archiv (German)	
Laage		Galerieholländer		Muehlen Archiv (German)	
Letzin		Erdholländer		House conversion Muehlen Archiv (German)	
Lichtenhagen	Lido Mühle	Sockelgeschossholländer	1836	House conversion, left of photo Muehlen Archiv (German); Zwillingswindmuehlen (German)	
Liechtenhagen	Lichtenhagener Mühle	Galerieholländer	1878	House conversion, right of photo Muehlen Archiv (German); Zwillingswindmuehlen (German)	
Malchow		Galerieholländer		Incorporated into engine driven mill Muehlen Archiv (German)	
Malchow		Galerieholländer		Muehlen Archiv (German)	
Mamerow		Sockelgeschossholländer		House conversion Muehlen Archiv (German)	
Marlow		Sockelgeschossholländer		Muehlen Archiv (German)	
Meesiger		Erdholländer		Derelict; Muehlen Archiv (German)	
Mühlenhagen		Erdholländer		Muehlen Archiv (German)	
Nantrow		Sockelgeschossholländer		Restored; Muehlen Archiv (German)	
Neubukow	Mühle Neubukow; Blohm Mühle; Evers Mühle	Galerieholländer	1910	Muehlen Archiv (German); Zwillingswindmuehlen (German)	
Neubukow		Turmholländer		Muehlen Archiv (German)	
Neuenkirchen		Erdholländer		Muehlen Archiv (German)	
Neu Hinrichdorf		Erdholländer			
Neukalen		Sockelgeschossholländer		Muehlen Archiv (German)	
Neukloster		Galerieholländer		House conversion Muehlen Archiv (German)	
Neu Rachow		Sockelgeschossholländer		Muehlen Archiv (German)	
Neu Thulendorf		Galerieholländer		House conversion Muehlen Archiv (German)	
Neu Vorwerk		Sockelgeschossholländer		Left in photo Muehlen Archiv (German)	
Neu Vorwerk		Galerieholländer		Right in photo Muehlen Archiv (German)	
Pasewalk		Turmholländer		Muehlen Archiv (German)	
Plöwen	Schillermühle	Sockelgeschossholländer		Incorporated into engine driven mill Muehlen Archiv (German)	
Polz		Sockelgeschossholländer			
Pudagla		Bockwindmühle		Muehlen Archiv (German)	
Röbel		Sockelgeschossholländer		Muehlen Archiv (German)	
Rostock		Galerieholländer		Muehlen Archiv (German)	
Rostock-Dierkow		Sockelgeschossholländer		Muehlen Archiv (German)	
Rostock-Dierkow		Sockelgeschossholländer		Muehlen Archiv (German)	
Rostock-Evershagen		Galerieholländer		Muehlen Archiv (German)	
Rostock-Warnemünde	Meyers Mühle	Galerieholländer	1860	Muehlen Archiv (German)	
Rostock-Südstadt	Mohrbergmühle	Galerieholländer	1864	Moved to Loose, Schleswig Holstein in 2001	
Rövershagen	Rövershagener Mühle	Sockelgeschossholländer	1881	Muehlen Archiv (German); Zwillingswindmuehlen (German)	
Ruchow		Sockelgeschossholländer		Muehlen Archiv (German)	Windmill in Ruchow
Sagard		Paltrockmühle		House conversion Muehlen Archiv (German)	Windmill in Sagard
Satow		Galerieholländer	1849	Base only, house conversion Zwillingswindmuehlen (German)	
Schönkamp		Erdholländer		Muehlen Archiv (German)	
Spantekow		Galerieholländer		Muehlen Archiv (German)	
Steinhagen		Erdholländer		Restored; Muehlen Archiv (German)	
Storkow		Bockwindmühle		Muehlen Archiv (German)	
Stove		Sockelgeschossholländer		Restored; Muehlen Archiv (German)	
Stralsund	Mahnkesche Mühle	Erdholländer		Muehlen Archiv (German)	
Streffenshagen	Buschkuhnsdorfer Mühle	Bockwindmühle	1999	Zwillingswindmuehlen (German)	
Thulendorf	Mühle Arnholt	Galerieholländer	1906	House conversion Zwillingswindmuehlen (German)	
Tolzin		Erdholländer		Derelict; Muehlen Archiv (German)	
Torpin		Sockelgeschossholländer		Derelict; Muehlen Archiv (German)	
Trassenheide		Erdholländer		Muehlen Archiv (German)	
Trent		Sockelgeschossholländer		House conversion Muehlen Archiv (German)	
Ueckermünde		Bockwindmühle		Restored; Muehlen Archiv (German)	
Varchentin		Sockelgeschossholländer		Muehlen Archiv (German)	
Verchen		Sockelgeschossholländer		Muehlen Archiv (German)	
Vitte		Erdholländer		Muehlen Archiv (German)	
Walkendorf		Galerieholländer		Muehlen Archiv (German)	
Wieck		Erdholländer		House conversion Muehlen Archiv (German)	
Wittenburg		Sockelgeschossholländer		Muehlen Archiv (German)	
Woldegk	Buddesche Mühle (Museumsmühle)	Erdholländer	1883	Muehlen Archiv (German)	
Woldegk	Ehlertsche Mühle	Sockelgeschossholländer		Muehlen Archiv (German)	
Woldegk	Mühle Ramme	Turmholländer		Muehlen Archiv (German)	
Woldegk	Gotteskampmühle (Töpfermühle)	Turmholländer		House conversion Muehlen Archiv (German)	
Woldegk	Kreienbringsche Mühle	Sockelgeschossholländer		Base only Muehlen Archiv (German)	
Woldegk	Fröhlckesche Mühle (Seemühle)	Galerieholländer		Muehlen Archiv (German)	
Wolgast		Erdholländer		Muehlen Archiv (German)	
Wolgast		Turmholländer		House conversion Muehlen Archiv (German)	
Wolgast		Erdholländer		Muehlen Archiv (German)	
Wustrow		Sockelgeschossholländer		House conversion Muehlen Archiv (German)	
Zepelin		Sockelgeschossholländer		Muehlen Archiv (German)	
Zwiedorf		Erdholländer		Muehlen Archiv (German)	
