= Blankensee =

Blankensee refers to the following places in Germany:

- Blankensee, Mecklenburg
- Blankensee, Uecker-Randow
