= Züsedom =

- Ortsteil of Rollwitz
- Interactive map of Züsedom
- Location within Germany Location within Mecklenburg-Vorpommern
- Coordinates: 53°26′N 14°00′E
- Country: Germany
- State: Mecklenburg-Vorpommern
- District: Vorpommern-Greifswald
- Municipality: Rollwitz

Area
  - Total: 10.35 km^{2} (4.00 sq mi)
- Elevation: 80 m (260 ft)

Population (2011-12-31)
  - Total: 243
  - Density: 23.5/km^{2} (60.8/sq mi)
- Time zone: UTC+01:00 (CET)
  - Summer (DST): UTC+02:00 (CEST)
- Postal codes: 17309
- Dialling codes: 039747
- Vehicle registration: VG
- Website: www.amt-uecker-randow-tal.de

Züsedom is a village and a former municipality in the Vorpommern-Greifswald district, in Mecklenburg-Vorpommern, Germany. Since 1 January 2012, it is part of the municipality Rollwitz.
