= Torgelow-Holländerei =

- Ortsteil of Torgelow
- Interactive map of Torgelow-Holländerei
- Location within Germany Location within Mecklenburg-Vorpommern
- Coordinates: 53°40′N 14°02′E
- Country: Germany
- State: Mecklenburg-Vorpommern
- District: Vorpommern-Greifswald
- Town: Torgelow

Area
  - Total: 5.8 km^{2} (2.2 sq mi)
- Elevation: 13 m (43 ft)

Population (2012-12-31)
  - Total: 399
  - Density: 69/km^{2} (180/sq mi)
- Time zone: UTC+01:00 (CET)
  - Summer (DST): UTC+02:00 (CEST)
- Postal codes: 17358
- Dialling codes: 03976
- Vehicle registration: VG
- Website: www.torgelow.de

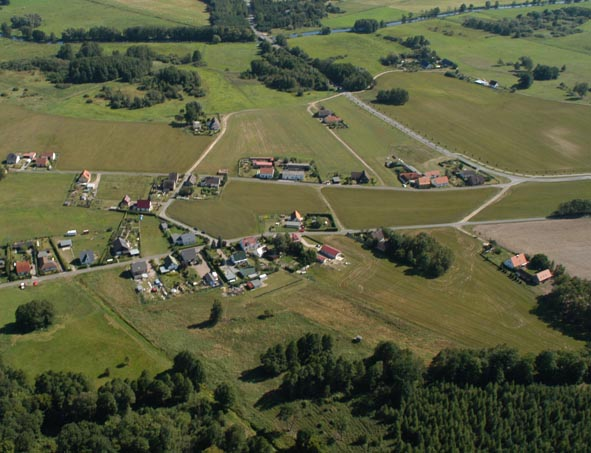
The aerial view of Torgelow-Holländerei

Torgelow-Holländerei (German pronunciation: [ˈtɔʁɡəloː ˌhɔlɛndəˈʁaɪ]) is a village and a former municipality in the Vorpommern-Greifswald district, in Mecklenburg-Vorpommern, Germany. Since 25 May 2014, it is part of the town Torgelow.

== History ==
From 1648 to 1720, Torgelow-Holländerei was part of Swedish Pomerania. From 1720 to 1945, it was part of the Prussian Province of Pomerania, from 1945 to 1952 of the State of Mecklenburg-Vorpommern, from 1952 to 1990 of the Bezirk Neubrandenburg of East Germany and since 1990 again of Mecklenburg-Vorpommern.
