= Damerow =

- Ortsteil of Rollwitz
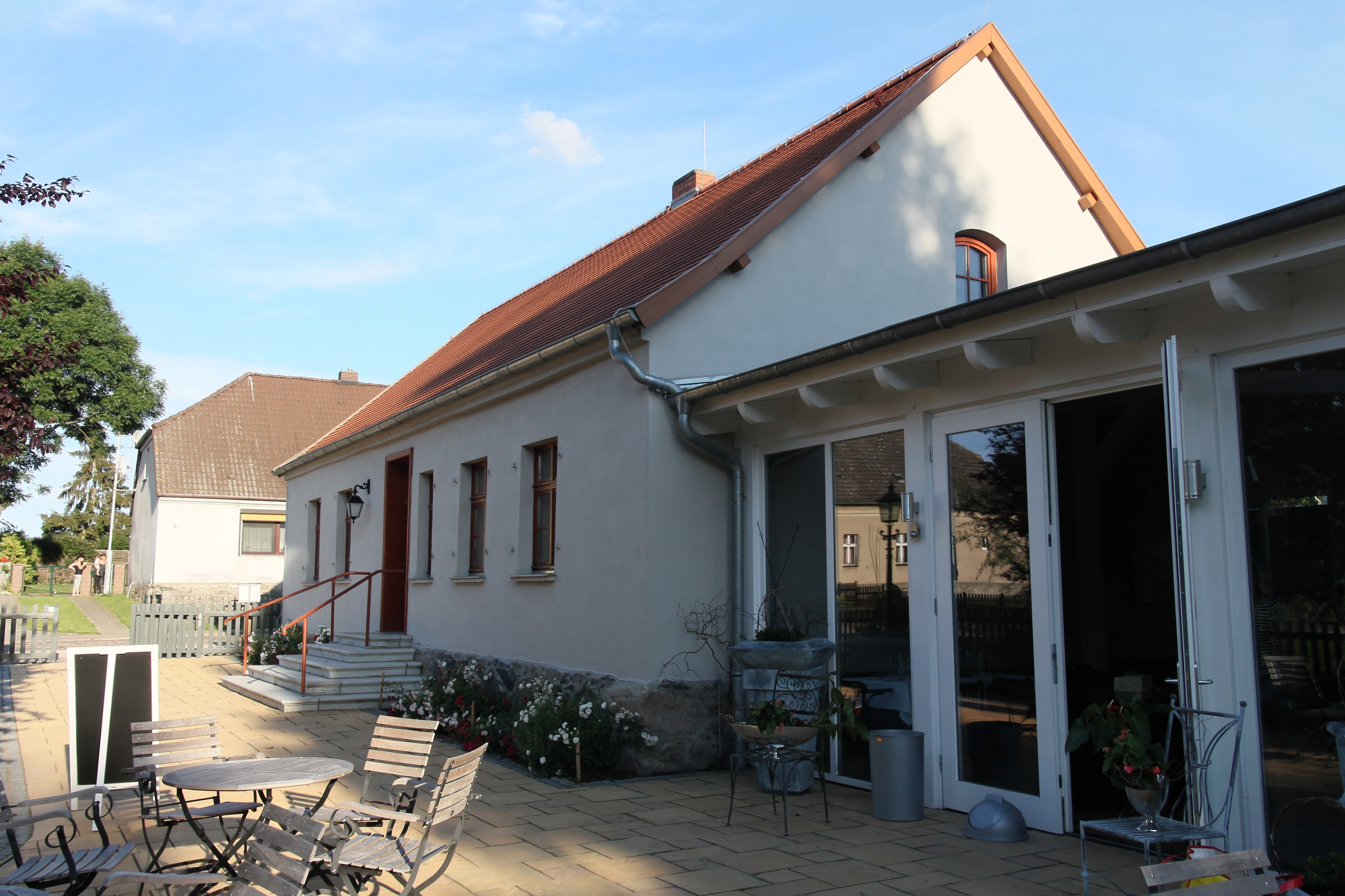
- Gutsmuseum and Museumscafe
- Interactive map of Damerow
- Location within Germany Location within Mecklenburg-Vorpommern
- Coordinates: 53°27′N 13°59′E
- Country: Germany
- State: Mecklenburg-Vorpommern
- District: Vorpommern-Greifswald
- Municipality: Rollwitz

Area
  - Total: 7.82 km^{2} (3.02 sq mi)
- Elevation: 50 m (160 ft)

Population (2011-12-31)
  - Total: 135
  - Density: 17.3/km^{2} (44.7/sq mi)
- Time zone: UTC+01:00 (CET)
  - Summer (DST): UTC+02:00 (CEST)
- Postal codes: 17309
- Dialling codes: 039747
- Vehicle registration: VG
- Website: www.amt-uecker-randow-tal.de

Damerow is a village and a former municipality in the Vorpommern-Greifswald district, in Mecklenburg-Vorpommern, Germany. Since 1 January 2012, it is part of the municipality Rollwitz.

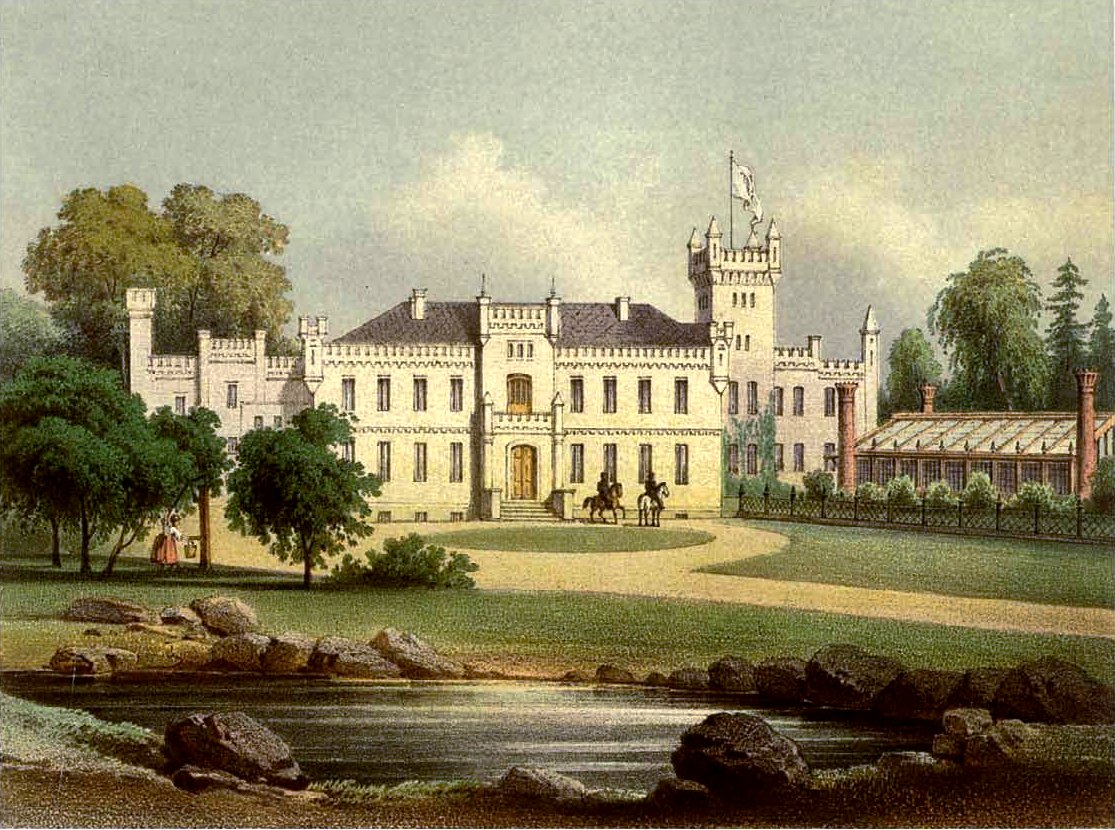
Palace Damerow around 1860, Edition by Alexander Duncker

There once was a manor house and lands in Damerow owned by the noble von Winterfeld family before it burned down in 1945.
