= Penkun =

Town in Mecklenburg-Vorpommern, Germany

- Town
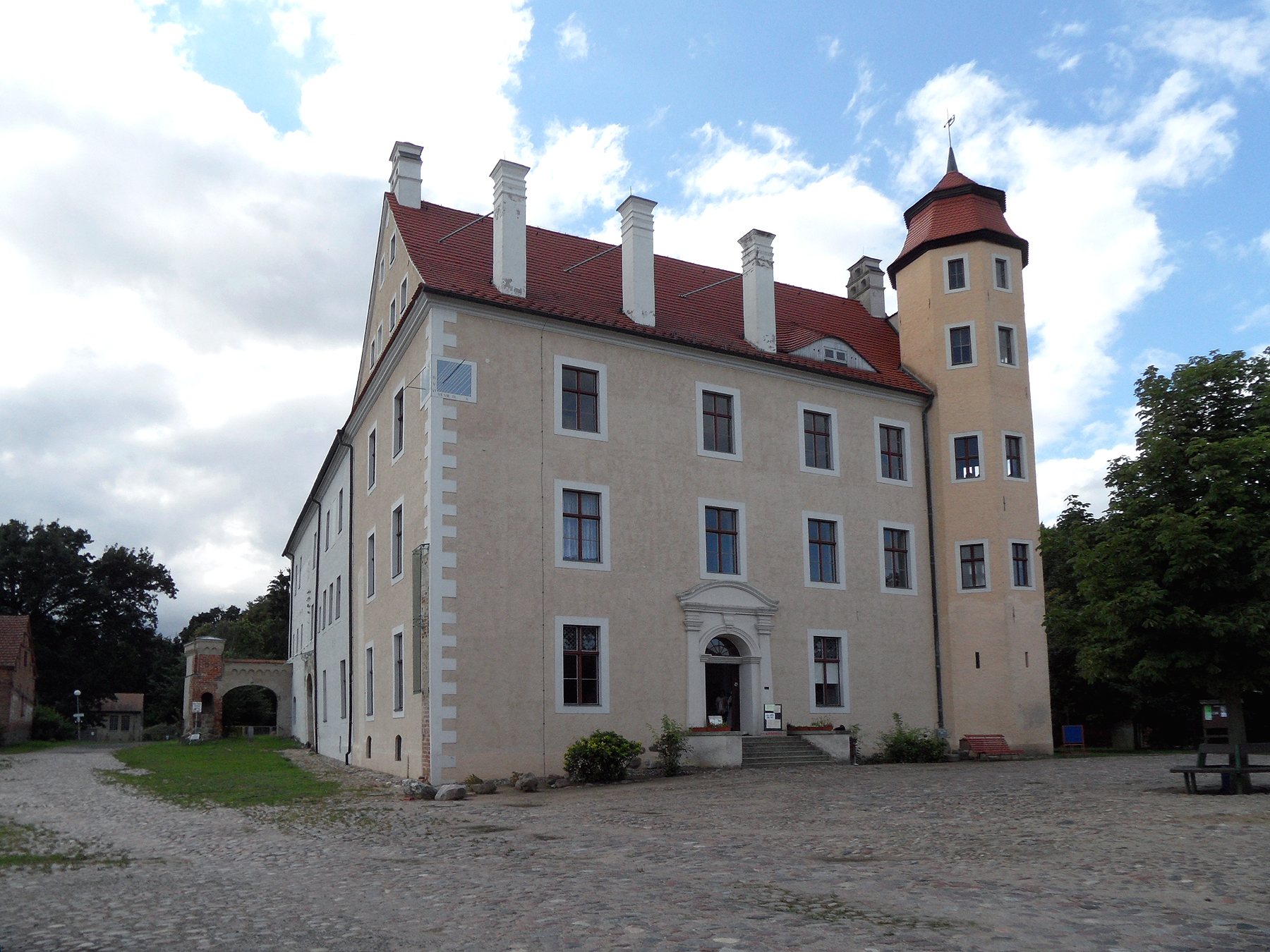
- Penkun Castle

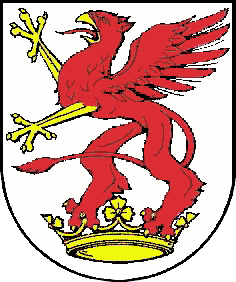
- Coat of arms

- Location of Penkun within Vorpommern-Greifswald district
- Interactive map of Penkun
- Location within Germany Location within Mecklenburg-Vorpommern
- Coordinates: 53°17′N 14°15′E
- Country: Germany
- State: Mecklenburg-Vorpommern
- District: Vorpommern-Greifswald
- Municipal assoc.: Löcknitz-Penkun
- Subdivisions: 4 Gemeindeteile

Government
  - Mayor: Bernd Netzel (FDP)

Area
  - Total: 78.88 km^{2} (30.46 sq mi)
- Elevation: 40 m (130 ft)

Population (2025-12-31)
  - Total: 1,672
  - Density: 21.20/km^{2} (54.90/sq mi)
- Time zone: UTC+01:00 (CET)
  - Summer (DST): UTC+02:00 (CEST)
- Postal codes: 17328
- Dialling codes: 039751
- Vehicle registration: VG
- Website: www.penkun.de

Penkun (German: [pɛŋˈkuːn]) is a town in the Vorpommern-Greifswald district, and one of the smallest in Mecklenburg-Western Pomerania, in north-eastern Germany. It is situated 25 kilometres (16 mi) east of Prenzlau, and 23 km (14 mi) southwest of Szczecin.

Penkun is known for its Renaissance castle. Due to its proximity to the Szczecin agglomeration, it is a prospering town. According to the 2022 census, Poles and Ukrainians constituted 10.6% and 2.9% of the population, respectively.

== History ==
The area formed part of Poland in the 12th century, and following the fragmentation of Poland into smaller duchies it was part of the Duchy of Pomerania until its dissolution in 1637. From 1648 to 1720, Penkun was part of Swedish Pomerania. From 1720 to 1945, it was part of the Prussian Province of Pomerania, from 1945 to 1952 of the State of Mecklenburg-Vorpommern, from 1952 to 1990 of the Bezirk Neubrandenburg of East Germany and since 1990 again of Mecklenburg-Vorpommern.

== Towns near Penkun ==
- Szczecin (Poland)
- Eggesin (Germany)
- Ueckermünde (Germany)
- Torgelow (Germany)
- Pasewalk (Germany)
- Gartz (Germany)
- Gryfino (Poland)
