= Heinrichsruh =

- Ortsteil of Torgelow
- Coat of arms
- Interactive map of Heinrichsruh
- Location within Germany Location within Mecklenburg-Vorpommern
- Coordinates: 53°39′N 13°55′E
- Country: Germany
- State: Mecklenburg-Vorpommern
- District: Vorpommern-Greifswald
- Town: Torgelow

Area
  - Total: 16.96 km^{2} (6.55 sq mi)
- Elevation: 10 m (33 ft)

Population (2012-12-31)
  - Total: 259
  - Density: 15.3/km^{2} (39.6/sq mi)
- Time zone: UTC+01:00 (CET)
  - Summer (DST): UTC+02:00 (CEST)
- Postal codes: 17379
- Dialling codes: 039778
- Vehicle registration: VG
- Website: www.amt-ferdinandshof.de

Heinrichsruh (German pronunciation: [ˈhaɪnʁɪçsˌʁuː]) is a village and a former municipality in the Vorpommern-Greifswald district, in Mecklenburg-Vorpommern, Germany. Since 25 May 2014, it is part of the town Torgelow.

== History ==
From 1648 to 1720, Heinrichsruh was part of Swedish Pomerania. From 1720 to 1945, it was part of the Prussian Province of Pomerania, from 1945 to 1952 of the State of Mecklenburg-Vorpommern, from 1952 to 1990 of the Bezirk Neubrandenburg of East Germany and since 1990 again of Mecklenburg-Vorpommern.
