= Torgelow-Ferdinandshof =

Amt in Mecklenburg-Vorpommern, Germany

- Amt
- Location of Torgelow-Ferdinandshof within Vorpommern-Greifswald district
- Interactive map of Torgelow-Ferdinandshof
- Location within Germany Location within Mecklenburg-Vorpommern
- Coordinates: 53°35′N 13°58′E
- Country: Germany
- State: Mecklenburg-Vorpommern
- District: Vorpommern-Greifswald
- Seat: Torgelow
- Subdivisions: 7 municipalities

Area
  - Total: 262.13 km^{2} (101.21 sq mi)

Population (2025-12-31)
  - Total: 13,492
  - Density: 51.471/km^{2} (133.31/sq mi)
- Time zone: UTC+01:00 (CET)
  - Summer (DST): UTC+02:00 (CEST)
- Website: www.amt-torgelow-ferdinandshof.de

Torgelow-Ferdinandshof is an Amt in the district of Vorpommern-Greifswald, in Mecklenburg-Vorpommern, Germany. The seat of the Amt is in Torgelow.

The Amt Torgelow-Ferdinandshof consists of the following municipalities:

1. Altwigshagen
2. Ferdinandshof
3. Hammer an der Uecker
4. Heinrichswalde
5. Rothemühl
6. Torgelow
7. Wilhelmsburg
