= Glasow (Vorpommern) =

- Municipality
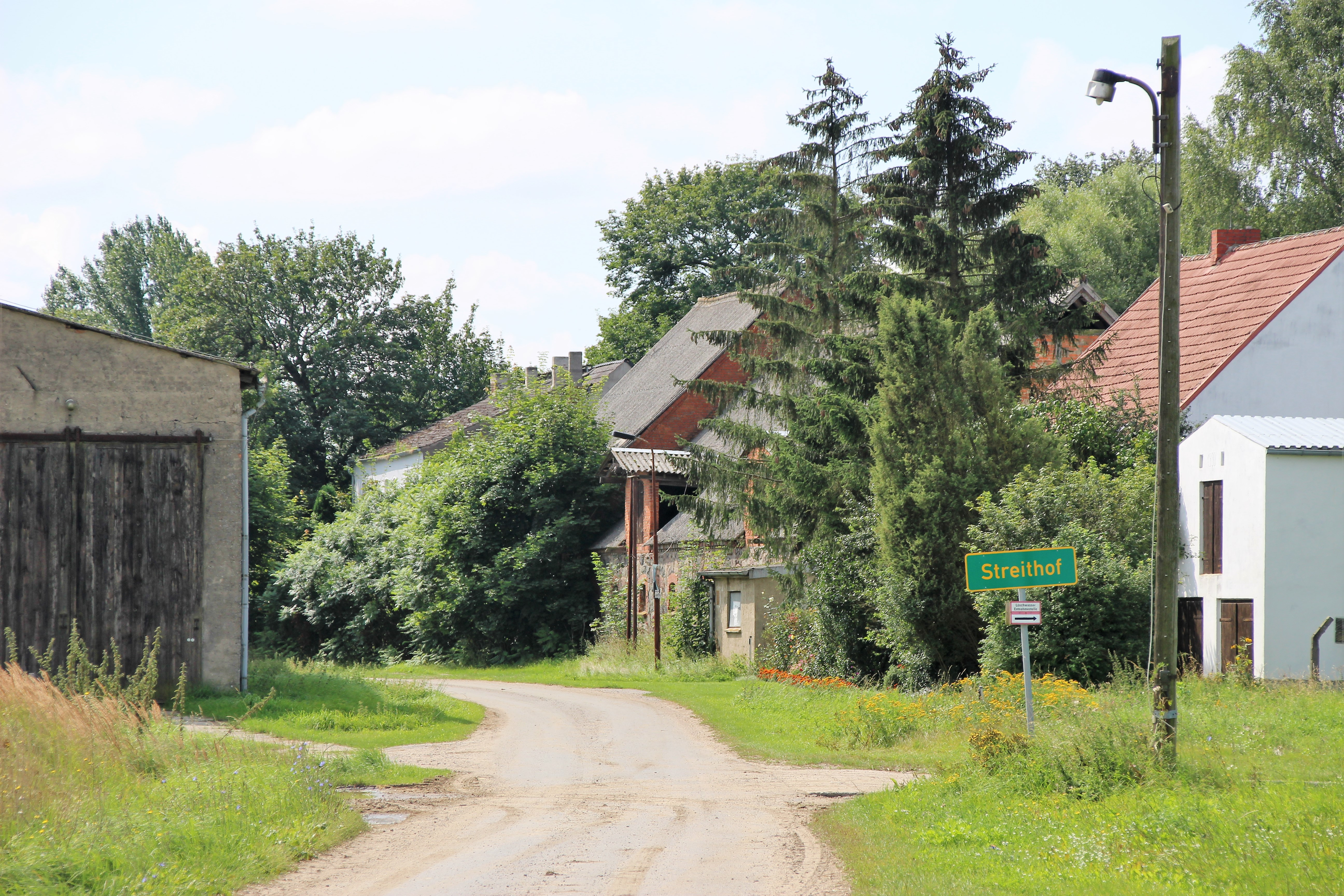

- Location of Glasow (Vorpommern) within Vorpommern-Greifswald district
- Interactive map of Glasow (Vorpommern)
- Location within Germany Location within Mecklenburg-Vorpommern
- Coordinates: 53°22′N 14°16′E
- Country: Germany
- State: Mecklenburg-Vorpommern
- District: Vorpommern-Greifswald
- Municipal assoc.: Löcknitz-Penkun

Government
  - Mayor: Reimund Sommer

Area
  - Total: 15.59 km^{2} (6.02 sq mi)
- Elevation: 34 m (112 ft)

Population (2025-12-31)
  - Total: 142
  - Density: 9.11/km^{2} (23.6/sq mi)
- Time zone: UTC+01:00 (CET)
  - Summer (DST): UTC+02:00 (CEST)
- Postal codes: 17322
- Dialling codes: 039751
- Vehicle registration: VG
- Website: www.amt-loecknitz-penkun.de

Glasow (Polish: Głazów) is a municipality in the Vorpommern-Greifswald district, in Mecklenburg-Vorpommern, in north-eastern Germany. It is located near the border with Poland, in the historic region of Pomerania.

According to the 2022 census, Poles constituted 18.1% of the population.

== History ==
The area formed part of Poland in the 12th century, and following the fragmentation of Poland into smaller duchies it was part of the Duchy of Pomerania until its dissolution in 1637. From 1648 to 1720, Glasow was part of Swedish Pomerania. From 1720 to 1945, it was part of the Prussian Province of Pomerania, from 1945 to 1952 of the State of Mecklenburg-Vorpommern, from 1952 to 1990 of the Bezirk Neubrandenburg of East Germany and since 1990 again of Mecklenburg-Vorpommern.
