= Hammer an der Uecker =

- Municipality
- Location of Hammer an der Uecker within Vorpommern-Greifswald district
- Interactive map of Hammer an der Uecker
- Location within Germany Location within Mecklenburg-Vorpommern
- Coordinates: 53°35′N 13°58′E
- Country: Germany
- State: Mecklenburg-Vorpommern
- District: Vorpommern-Greifswald
- Municipal assoc.: Torgelow-Ferdinandshof

Government
  - Mayor: Petra Mädl

Area
  - Total: 21.47 km^{2} (8.29 sq mi)
- Elevation: 10 m (33 ft)

Population (2025-12-31)
  - Total: 440
  - Density: 20/km^{2} (53/sq mi)
- Time zone: UTC+01:00 (CET)
  - Summer (DST): UTC+02:00 (CEST)
- Postal codes: 17358
- Dialling codes: 03976
- Vehicle registration: VG
- Website: www.amt-ferdinandshof.de

Hammer an der Uecker is a municipality in the Vorpommern-Greifswald district, in Mecklenburg-Vorpommern, Germany. The eponymous Uecker is a proximate river.

== History ==
From 1648 to 1720, Hammer an der Uecker was part of Swedish Pomerania. From 1720 to 1945, it was part of the Prussian Province of Pomerania, from 1945 to 1952 of the State of Mecklenburg-Vorpommern, from 1952 to 1990 of the Bezirk Neubrandenburg of East Germany and since 1990 again of Mecklenburg-Vorpommern.
