= Löcknitz-Penkun =

Amt in Mecklenburg-Vorpommern, Germany

- Amt
- Location of Löcknitz-Penkun within Vorpommern-Greifswald district
- Interactive map of Löcknitz-Penkun
- Location within Germany Location within Mecklenburg-Vorpommern
- Coordinates: 53°24′N 14°17′E
- Country: Germany
- State: Mecklenburg-Vorpommern
- District: Vorpommern-Greifswald
- Seat: Löcknitz
- Subdivisions: 13 municipalities

Area
  - Total: 430.06 km^{2} (166.05 sq mi)

Population (2025-12-31)
  - Total: 10,122
  - Density: 23.536/km^{2} (60.959/sq mi)
- Time zone: UTC+01:00 (CET)
  - Summer (DST): UTC+02:00 (CEST)
- Website: www.amt-loecknitz-penkun.de

Löcknitz-Penkun is an Amt in the district of Vorpommern-Greifswald, in Mecklenburg-Vorpommern, Germany. The seat of the Amt is in Löcknitz.

The Amt Löcknitz-Penkun consists of the following municipalities:

1. Bergholz
2. Blankensee
3. Boock
4. Glasow
5. Grambow
6. Krackow
7. Löcknitz
8. Nadrensee
9. Penkun
10. Plöwen
11. Ramin
12. Rossow
13. Rothenklempenow
