= Bergholz, Mecklenburg-Vorpommern =

- Municipality
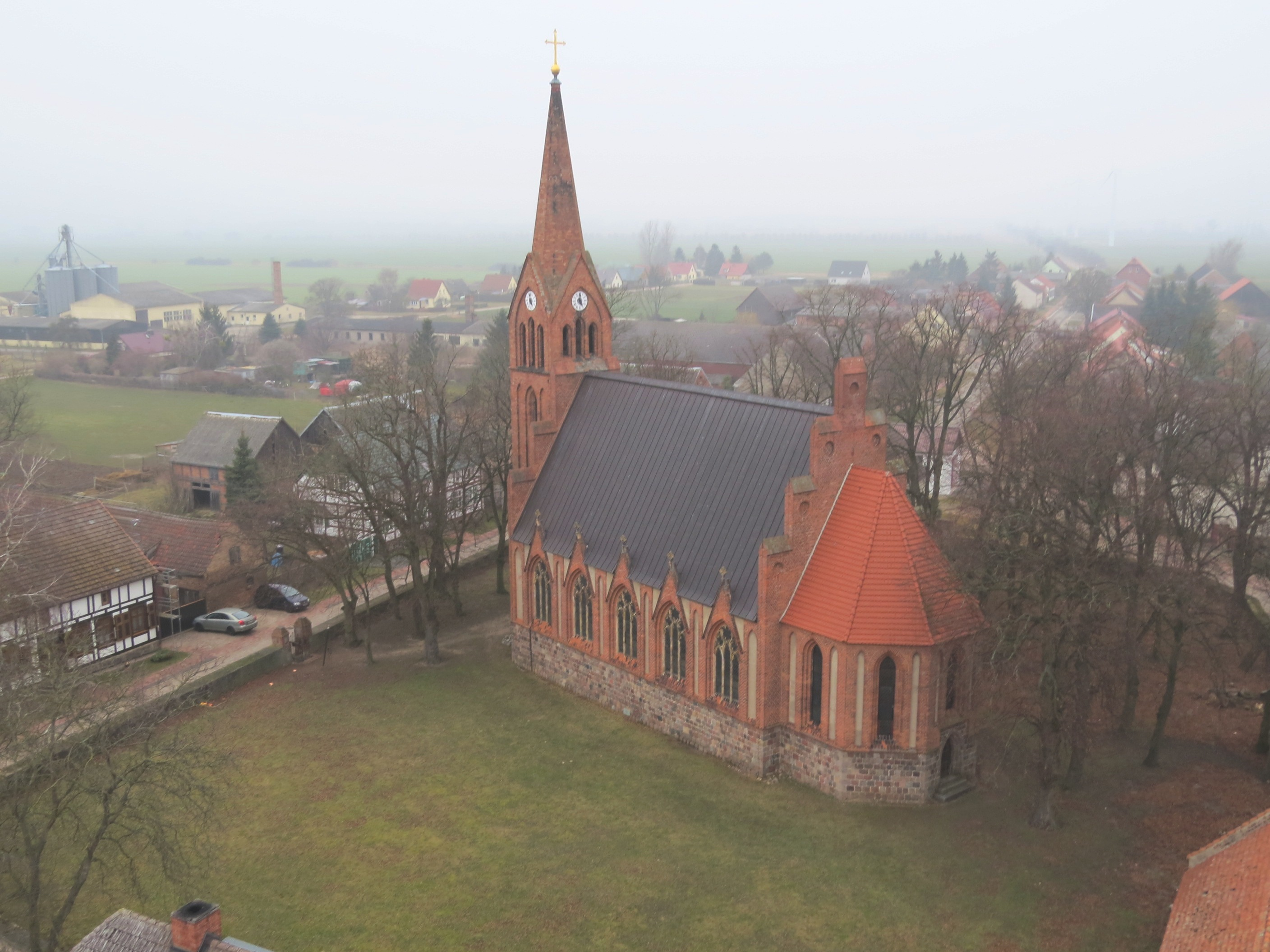
- Aerial view of Bergholz with the village church

- Location of Bergholz, Mecklenburg-Vorpommern within Vorpommern-Greifswald district
- Interactive map of Bergholz, Mecklenburg-Vorpommern
- Location within Germany Location within Mecklenburg-Vorpommern
- Coordinates: 53°26′N 14°10′E
- Country: Germany
- State: Mecklenburg-Vorpommern
- District: Vorpommern-Greifswald
- Municipal assoc.: Löcknitz-Penkun

Government
  - Mayor: Ulrich Kersten

Area
  - Total: 21.7 km^{2} (8.4 sq mi)
- Elevation: 34 m (112 ft)

Population (2025-12-31)
  - Total: 308
  - Density: 14.2/km^{2} (36.8/sq mi)
- Time zone: UTC+01:00 (CET)
  - Summer (DST): UTC+02:00 (CEST)
- Postal codes: 17321
- Dialling codes: 039754
- Vehicle registration: VG
- Website: www.loecknitz-online.de

Bergholz is a municipality in the Vorpommern-Greifswald district, in Mecklenburg-Vorpommern, Germany.
