= Rossow =

- Municipality
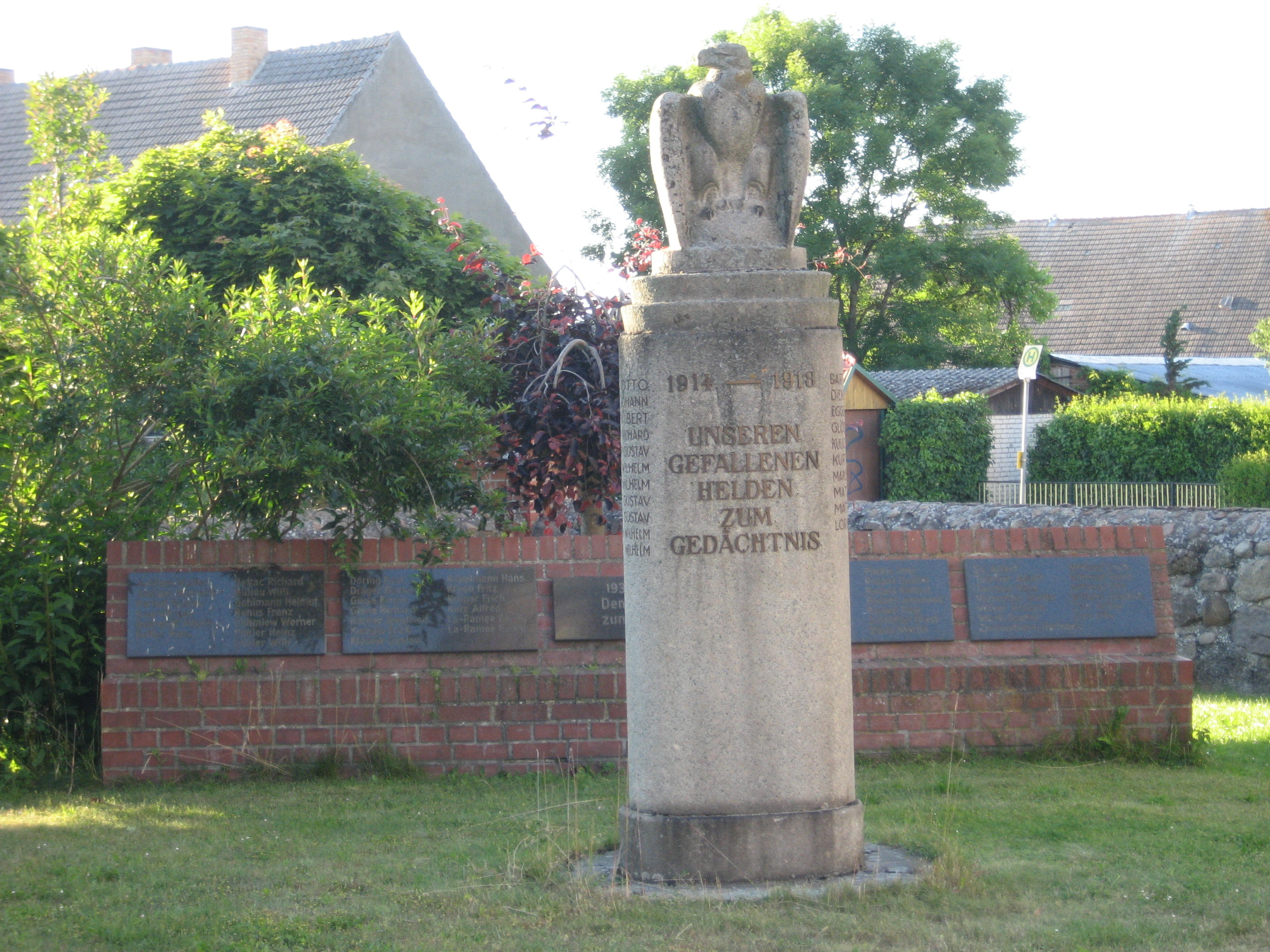
- War memorial in Rossow

- Location of Rossow within Vorpommern-Greifswald district
- Interactive map of Rossow
- Location within Germany Location within Mecklenburg-Vorpommern
- Coordinates: 53°28′N 14°07′E
- Country: Germany
- State: Mecklenburg-Vorpommern
- District: Vorpommern-Greifswald
- Municipal assoc.: Löcknitz-Penkun

Government
  - Mayor: Steffen Tuleya (geb. Kremp)

Area
  - Total: 23.09 km^{2} (8.92 sq mi)
- Elevation: 35 m (115 ft)

Population (2025-12-31)
  - Total: 453
  - Density: 19.6/km^{2} (50.8/sq mi)
- Time zone: UTC+01:00 (CET)
  - Summer (DST): UTC+02:00 (CEST)
- Postal codes: 17322
- Dialling codes: 039754
- Vehicle registration: VG
- Website: www.amt-loecknitz-penkun.de

Rossow is a municipality in the Vorpommern-Greifswald district, in Mecklenburg-Vorpommern, Germany.
