= Rollwitz =

- Municipality
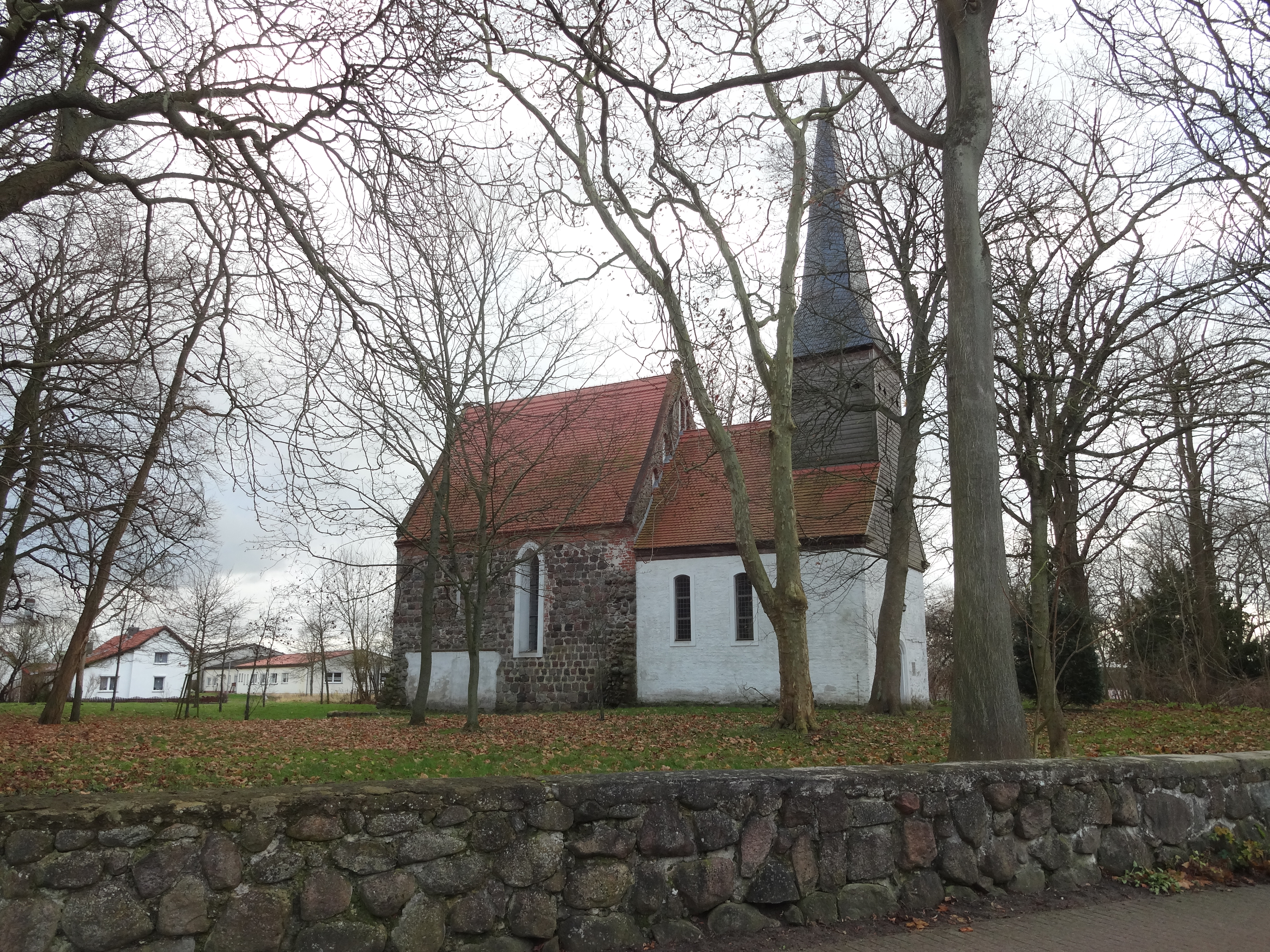
- Rollwitz village church

- Location of Rollwitz within Vorpommern-Greifswald district
- Interactive map of Rollwitz
- Location within Germany Location within Mecklenburg-Vorpommern
- Coordinates: 53°28′N 13°59′E
- Country: Germany
- State: Mecklenburg-Vorpommern
- District: Vorpommern-Greifswald
- Municipal assoc.: Uecker-Randow-Tal

Government
  - Mayor: Frank Marquardt

Area
  - Total: 35.57 km^{2} (13.73 sq mi)
- Elevation: 55 m (180 ft)

Population (2025-12-31)
  - Total: 820
  - Density: 23/km^{2} (60/sq mi)
- Time zone: UTC+01:00 (CET)
  - Summer (DST): UTC+02:00 (CEST)
- Postal codes: 17309
- Dialling codes: 03973, 039740
- Vehicle registration: VG
- Website: www.gemeinde-rollwitz.de

Rollwitz is a municipality in the Vorpommern-Greifswald district, in Mecklenburg-Vorpommern, Germany.
