= Torgelow =

Town in Mecklenburg-Vorpommern, Germany

- Town
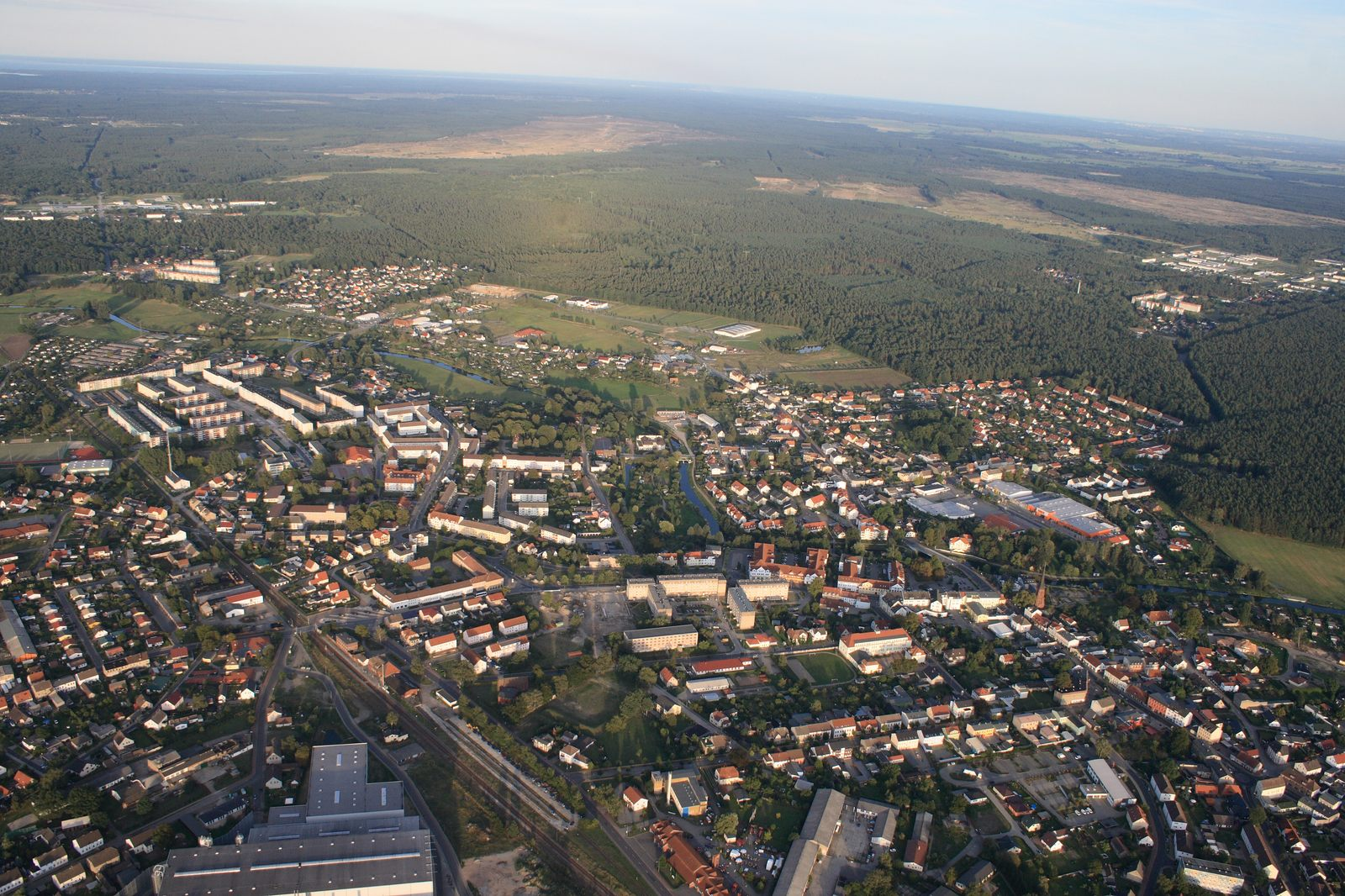
- Aerial view

- Flag Coat of arms

- Location of Torgelow within Vorpommern-Greifswald district
- Interactive map of Torgelow
- Location within Germany Location within Mecklenburg-Vorpommern
- Coordinates: 53°37′N 14°00′E
- Country: Germany
- State: Mecklenburg-Vorpommern
- District: Vorpommern-Greifswald
- Municipal assoc.: Torgelow-Ferdinandshof

Government
  - Mayor: Kerstin Pukallus

Area
  - Total: 72.19 km^{2} (27.87 sq mi)
- Elevation: 10 m (33 ft)

Population (2025-12-31)
  - Total: 8,755
  - Density: 121.3/km^{2} (314.1/sq mi)
- Time zone: UTC+01:00 (CET)
  - Summer (DST): UTC+02:00 (CEST)
- Postal codes: 17358
- Dialling codes: 03976
- Vehicle registration: VG
- Website: www.torgelow.de

Torgelow (German pronunciation: [ˈtɔʁɡəloː]) is a municipality in the Vorpommern-Greifswald district, in Mecklenburg-Western Pomerania in north-eastern Germany. It is situated on the river Uecker, 12 km south of Ueckermünde, and 41 km northwest of Szczecin, Poland. Torgelow was ranked a city on 4 May 1945.

== History ==
The town was originally founded by Polabians. From 1648 to 1720, Torgelow was part of Swedish Pomerania. From 1720 to 1945, it was part of the Prussian Province of Pomerania, from 1945 to 1952 of the State of Mecklenburg-Vorpommern, from 1952 to 1990 of the Bezirk Neubrandenburg of East Germany and since 1990 again of Mecklenburg-Vorpommern.

== People ==
- Piet Leidreiter (born 1965), politician
