= Landskron =

Landskron may refer to:

== Castles ==
- Landskron Castle (Carinthia), in Austria
- Château de Landskron, in Alsace, France
- Veste Landskron, in Ostvorpommern, Germany
- Landskron Castle, in Bad Neuenahr, Eiffel, Germany
- Landskron Castle, in Oppenheim, Germany
- Landskron Castle, in Bruck an der Mur, Styria, Austria

== Places ==
- Landskron, part of Villach, a village in Austria
- Lanškroun, called Landskron in German, a town in the Czech Republic

== People ==
- Münch von Landskron, a family name in the Münch (family lineage)

== See also ==
- Landskrone (disambiguation)
- Landskrona, a town in Sweden
- Landeskrone, a hill in Germany
- Lanckorona, Poland
