= Münch =

Münch or Muench is a German surname, meaning "monk". Notable people with this surname include the following:

- Edvard Munch (1863–1944), Norwegian Expressionist Painter, best known for "The Scream"
- Aloisius Joseph Muench (1889–1962), German-American cardinal, Papal Nuncio to Germany 1951–1959
- Burkhard VII. Münch (died 1444), Swiss knight
- Charles Munch (conductor), born Münch (1891–1968), Alsatian conductor
- Baron Eligius Franz Joseph von Münch-Bellinghausen (1806–1871), Austrian playwright better known by his pen name, Friedrich Halm
- Ernst Münch (musician) (1859–1928), Alsatian organist
- Ernst Münch (1876–1946), German plant physiologist
- Friedrich Münch (1799–1881), German-American Rationalist, winemaker, Missouri State Senator and prolific author for German emigrants
- Guido Münch (1921–2020), Mexican astronomer
- Hans Münch (1911–2001), SS doctor acquitted in the Auschwitz trials
- Hartung Münch (c. 1265–1332), Bishop of Basel from 1325 to 1328
- Helmut Münch (1939–2024), German computer scientist and politician
- Julitta Münch (1959-2020), German journalist
- Richard Münch (1916–1987), German actor
- Werner Münch (born 1940), German politician of the CDU party
- Münch (family lineage), noble family originating in Basel, Switzerland, including the branches Münch von Münchenstein, Münch von Münchsberg and Münch von Landskro

== See also ==
- Münch (motorcycles) a small German motorbike factory (between 1967 and 1976), founded by and named after Friedel Münch
- Munch (disambiguation)
- Munich
