= Trotte (Münchenstein) =

Building in Basel-Landschaft, Switzerland

Coordinates: 47.5125°N 7.62108°E

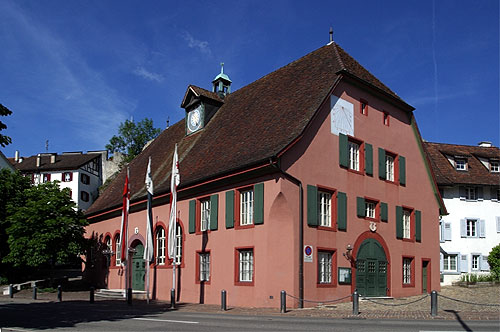
Trotte in Münchenstein

The Trotte (formerly known as the Zehntentrotte) lies in the village centre of Münchenstein, in the canton of Basel-Country in Switzerland.
The German word Trotte means wine press.

== Location ==
The ruins of Münchenstein Castle are situated on a long, but narrow rock above the urban centre of Münchenstein. The oldest residential buildings, that form the village centre are strung in a row along the foot of the castle rock. This pattern is interrupted by the inclination of the Trotte, which is situated directly below the castle ruins.

== History ==
Up until the foundation and the erection of the Castle (Schloss), the small residential colony had only a few houses and the village was named Geckingen. The first historical records in written form was in 1196 and the colony was named as Kekingen.

Around the year 1260 the up-rising cavalier family Münch acquired the village on the hills adjacent to the river Birs and established their estate there. After the year 1279 the village Geckingen was called Münchenstein. The cavalier family Münch named themselves henceforth Münch von Münchenstein. During 1470 Konrad Münch von Münchenstein had to sell the deeds to the city of Basel. The Trotte served the farmers as wine press and here within the building the tax "Weinzehnt" was taped (every tenth measure was retained as charge/tax).

As the governance/sovereignty of Münchenstein was transferred to authorities of the city, the Zehntentrotte was rebuilt. During 1560 it was totally reconstructed and expanded.

During the first half of the 19th century the building was refurbished into its modern-day status. Its interior was rebuilt, the wine press rooms were replaced by a large modern hall with oak pillars, a wooden ceiling and historical wall paintings.

== Wall Paintings ==
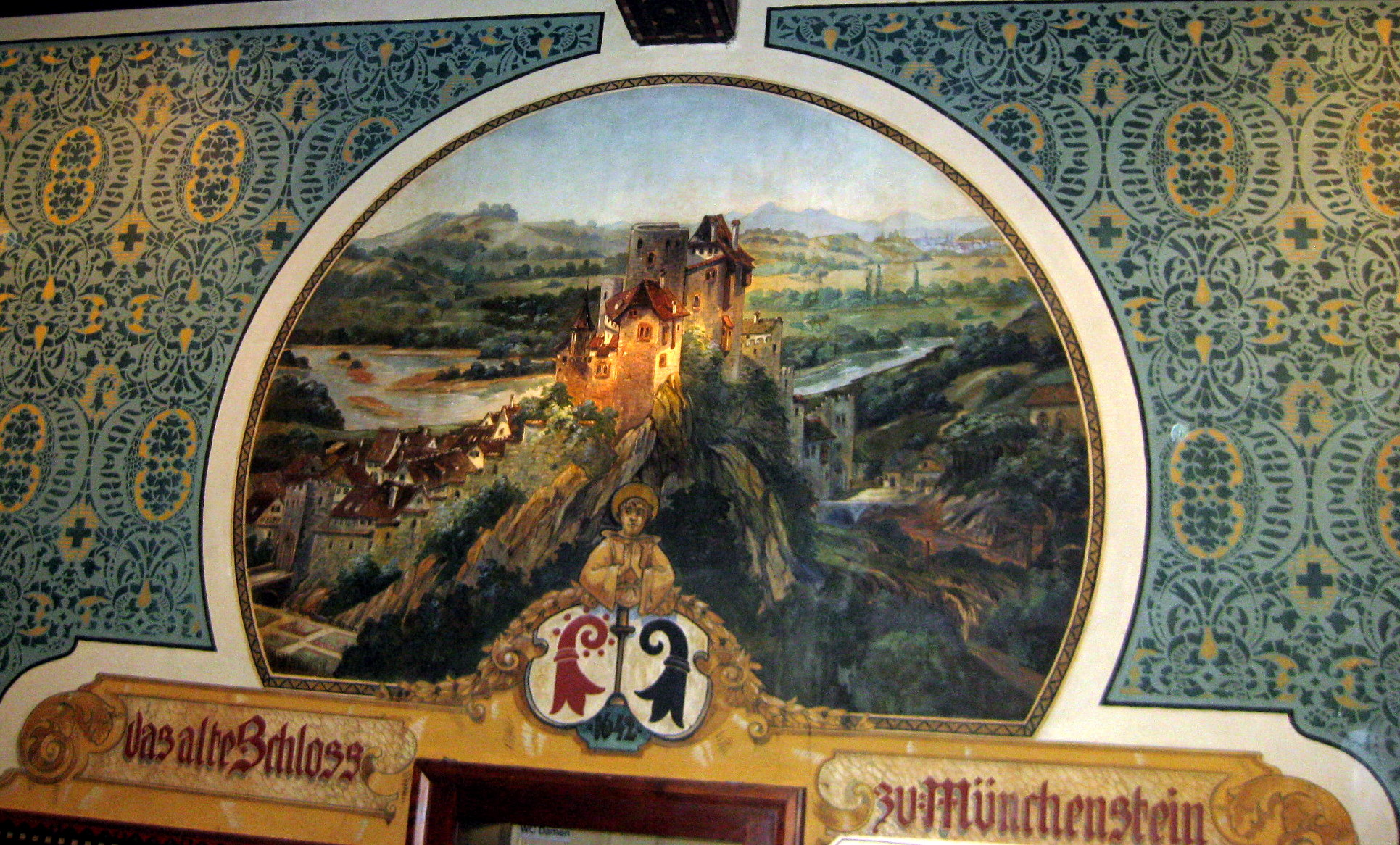
Das alte Schloss zu Münchenstein

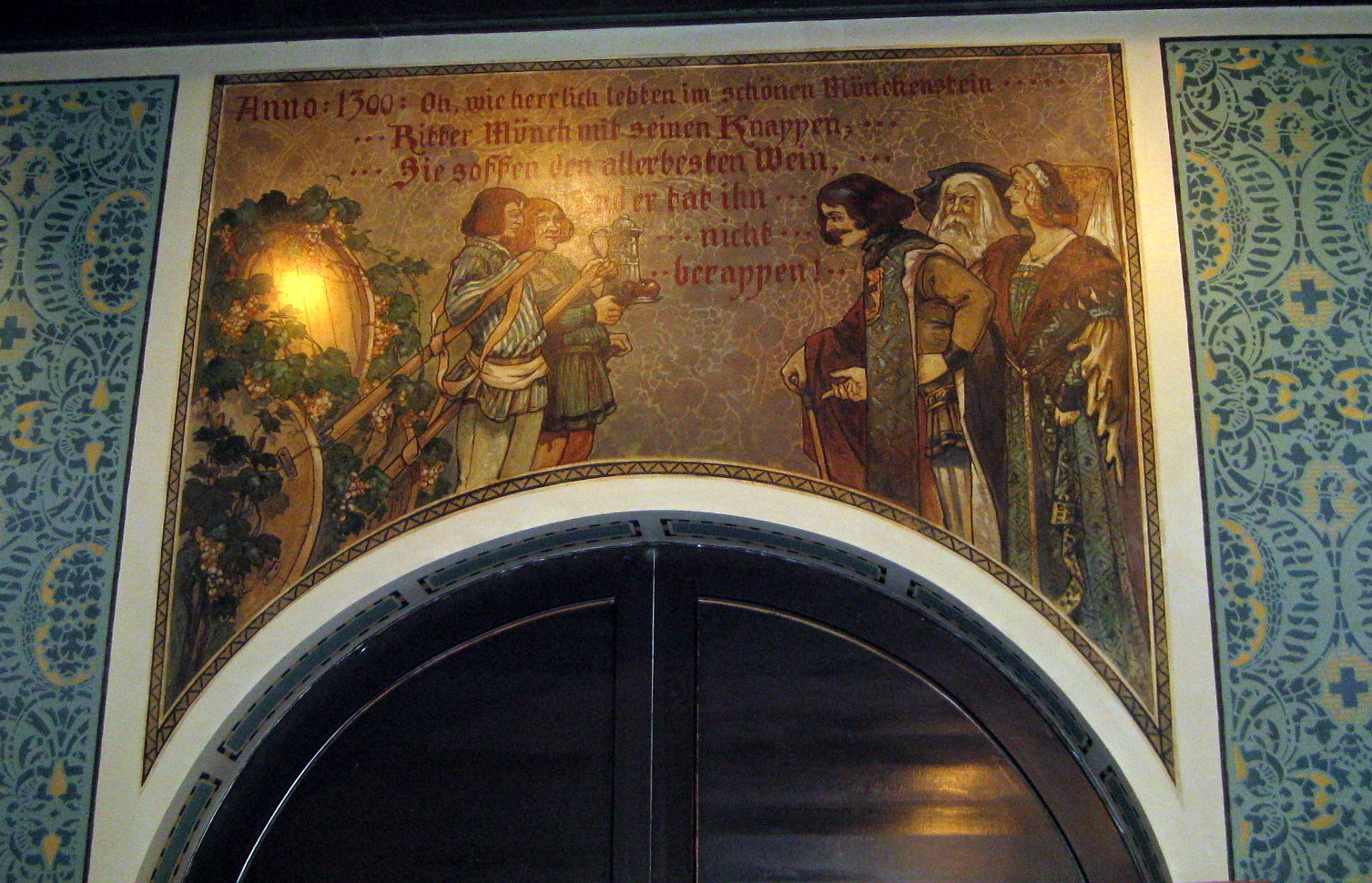
Ritter Münch mit seinen knappen

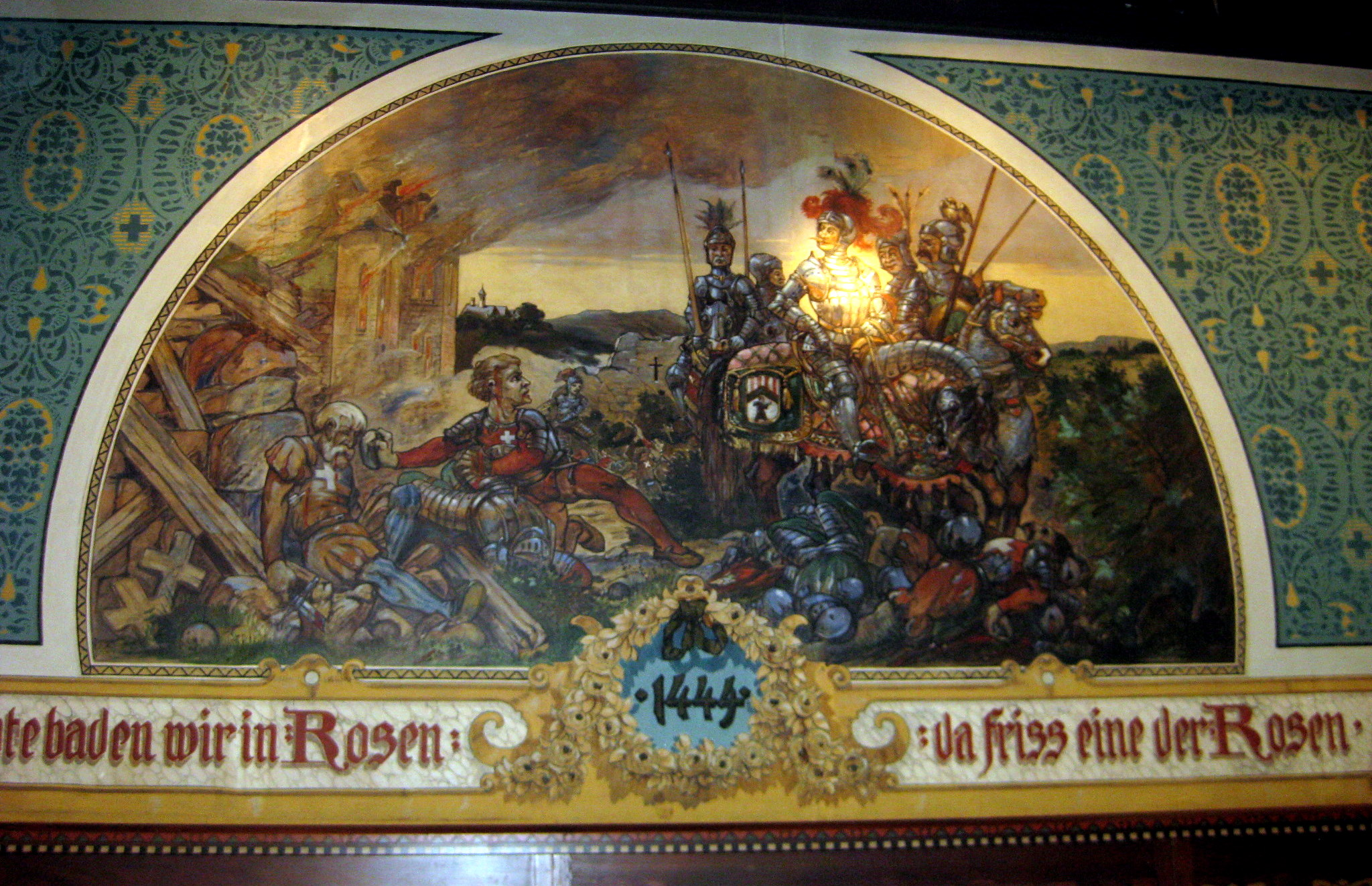
Heute baden wir im Rosen – da friss eine der Rosen

Das alte Schloss zu Münchenstein (The old Castle to Münchenstein): During the year 1334 the castle was completed and was at its largest. A few years later, the castle was damaged by the Basel earthquake on 18 October 1356, but soon restored to its original condition.

Ritter Münch mit seinen knappen (Cavalier Münchs tight money policy): Anno 1300: Oh how marvellous the cavaliers Münch, with their tight money policy, could live in Münchenstein, they would drink the best wines and need not fork out for them.

Heute baden wir im Rosen – da friss eine der Rosen (today we bathe in Roses – here eat one of the Roses): Burkhard VII. Münch achieved sad reputation after the Battle of St. Jakob an der Birs in 1444. According to the legend, after the battle where he acted as negotiator and translator for the Armagnacs, he rode his horse across the battlefield to witness the dead and the wounded. As he raised the visor of his helmet he uttered a sentence that was to become famous: "Ich siche in ein rossegarten, den min fordren geret hand vor hunderd jar". This ostentation and the arrogant phrase provoked one of the wounded Swiss pikemen to sling a stone into the open visor. The pikeman made the equally famous commentary "Here eat one to the roses".
