= Munch =

Munch may refer to:

== Places ==
- Munch Township, Pine County, Minnesota

== Media ==
- Cookie Monster Munch, a 1983 Sesame Street video game for the Atari 2600
- John Munch, a fictional character played by actor Richard Belzer
- Monster Munch (video game), an indirect clone of Pac-Man that was targeted towards the Commodore 64 gaming demographics
- Munch Bunch, a series of children's books written by British author Denis Bond
- Oddworld: Munch's Oddysee, a 2001 platform video game made by Oddworld Inhabitants
- Munchie, a fictional elf in Wee Sing: The Best Christmas Ever
- "Munch (Feelin' U)", a song by Ice Spice

== Food ==
- Munch (candy bar), a candy bar manufactured by Mars, Incorporated and sold in the United States
- Munch, a chocolate bar made by Nestlé, and sold in India
- Mighty Munch, a corn snack available in Ireland made by Tayto
- Monster Munch, a baked corn snack available in the United Kingdom, produced by Walkers
- Munch Bunch, a yogurt and fromage frais brand aimed at young children which is owned by Nestlé

== Other ==
- Munch (surname)
  - Especially Edvard Munch (1863–1944), Norwegian artist, painted The Scream
- Munch, or MUNCH, formally known as Munch Museum at Bjørvika
- Munch (BDSM), a low-pressure social gathering for people involved in or interested in BDSM
- Munch (crater), a crater on planet Mercury
- Mr. Munch, a character from Chuck E. Cheese

== See also ==
- Münch
- Munich
- Munsch
