= Burkhard VII. Münch =

Swiss knight (died 1444)

Burkhard VII. Münch (died 29 August 1444) was a knight and life peer, a renowned late member of the Landskron branch of the Münch family. His reputation rests primarily on his death at the Battle of St. Jakob an der Birs. Burkhard's death spelled the end of the family Münch of Landskron, which ended completely when his brother Johann IX. died in 1461.

== St. Jakob an der Birs ==
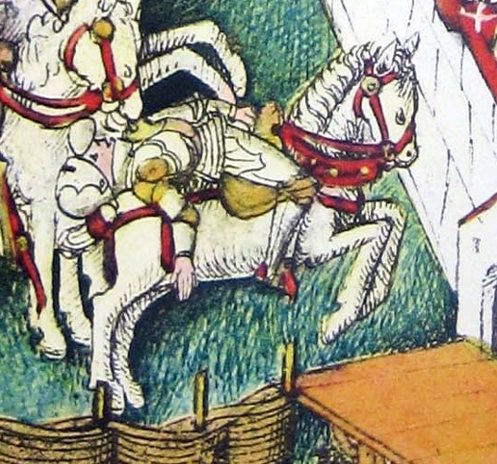
Burkhardt falling off his horse, hit by a rock. Detail of the St. Jakob an der Birs scene in the Tschachtlanchronik of 1470

Being a Habsburg faithful, Burkhard rode as knight with Louis the Dauphin and Jean V de Bueil. He was also named by the French as Bourgeamoine. He joined the Armagnacs in the battle against the Swiss Eidgenossenschaft as negotiator, translator and guide. His demeanour following the Battle of St. Jakob an der Birs is a theme in Swiss patriotic historiography.

The Battle of St. Jakob an der Birs was fought on 26 August 1444. The Swiss had attacked a much larger force of Armagnac mercenaries, and as the offensive party categorically refused to surrender. They retreated to a last stand in a small hospital of St. Jakob, where they were decimated by artillery.

As the Dauphin's translator, Burkhard was sent as negotiator to the decimated Swiss in the hospital to offer them the chance of honorable surrender and safe conduct. But as he rode into the hospital, and the many dead and wounded among the Swiss he is said to have raised the visor of his helmet and mocked the Eidgenossen in a phrase that would become famous in Swiss historiography: Ich siche in ein rossegarten, den min fordren geret hand vor 100 [hunderd] joren ("I gaze out into a rosarium, that my ancestors planted one hundred years ago"). Provoked by this arrogant phrase, one of the dying Swiss, one Arnold Schick of Uri, hurled a rock into the open visor. The equally famous answer that accompanied the throw was reported as: Da friss eine der Rosen! ("Here, eat one of the roses"). Burkhard fell from his saddle and was dragged from the battlefield. He died from his wounds three days later. The Swiss refusal to surrender led to the storming of the hospital, in which the defenders were killed nearly to the last man.

== In modern Swiss national historiography ==
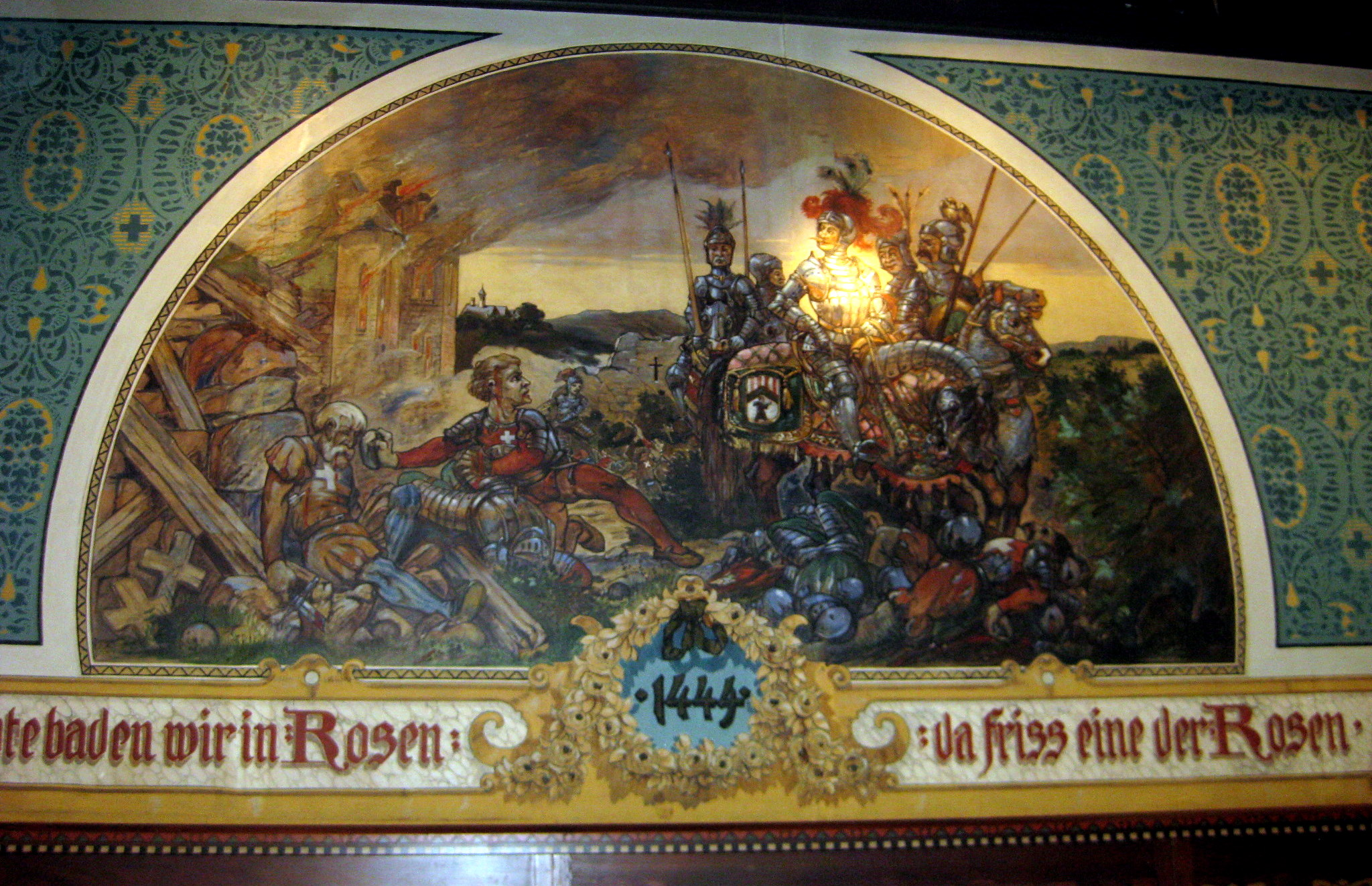
The scene of Arnold Schick throwing the rock at Burkhard as depicted in a 19th-century fresco in the winery at Münchenstein. Burkhard's rather contrived utterance is given as Heute baden wir in Rosen" ("today we bathe in roses") in the inscription, a simplification that had been current since the 18th century.

The contrast of the cultured nobleman alluding to the literary trope of the rose garden on the battlefield to the laconic reply of the dying Swiss captain appears in patriotic accounts of Swiss history during the 18th and 19th centuries. So in Johannes von Müller (1805), Burkhard is depicted as a coward who watched the battle from afar, and after the battle came "riding among and over the mighty dead bodies", as he noted "the agony of one of the heroes, he intended to sour his last moments with mockery, he cried, with laughter, to the noblemen 'today we bathe in roses!'", and of the dying captain: "anger revived his spirits, 'eat one of the roses!' the dying hero cried, and hurled with strength and truly aimed, the rock squashed his eyes, his nose, his mouth, blind and speechless lord Burkhard sank to the ground, and suffered, until on the third day death ended his pain, and he was not buried in the tomb of his fathers."

A depiction of Arnold Schick throwing the rock, with the inscription citing his dictum of ''Da friss eine der Rosen alongside Für Freiheit und Vaterland ("For Liberty and Fatherland") appears on a silver medal cast for the cantonal tir at Binningen, Basel in 1893.
