= Angstloch =

Floor hole in medieval castles that led to a cellar or basement

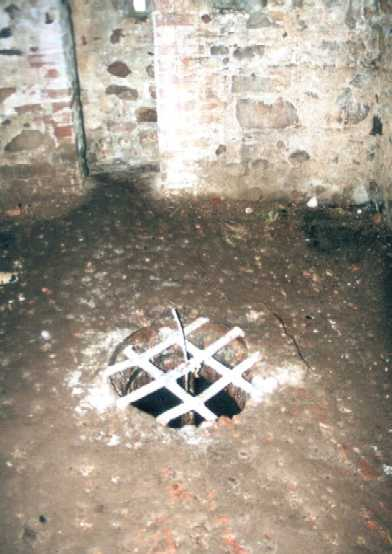
An angstloch at Spantekow Fortress

An Angstloch (German: [ˈaŋstˌlɔx], apparently "fear hole", but more probably from the Lat. angustus "narrow" and German Loch "hole") was a small hole in the floor of medieval castles and fortresses that led to a cellar or basement room below. The term is German and has no English equivalent, although a door, where there is one, to such a hole is called a trapdoor (German: Falltür).

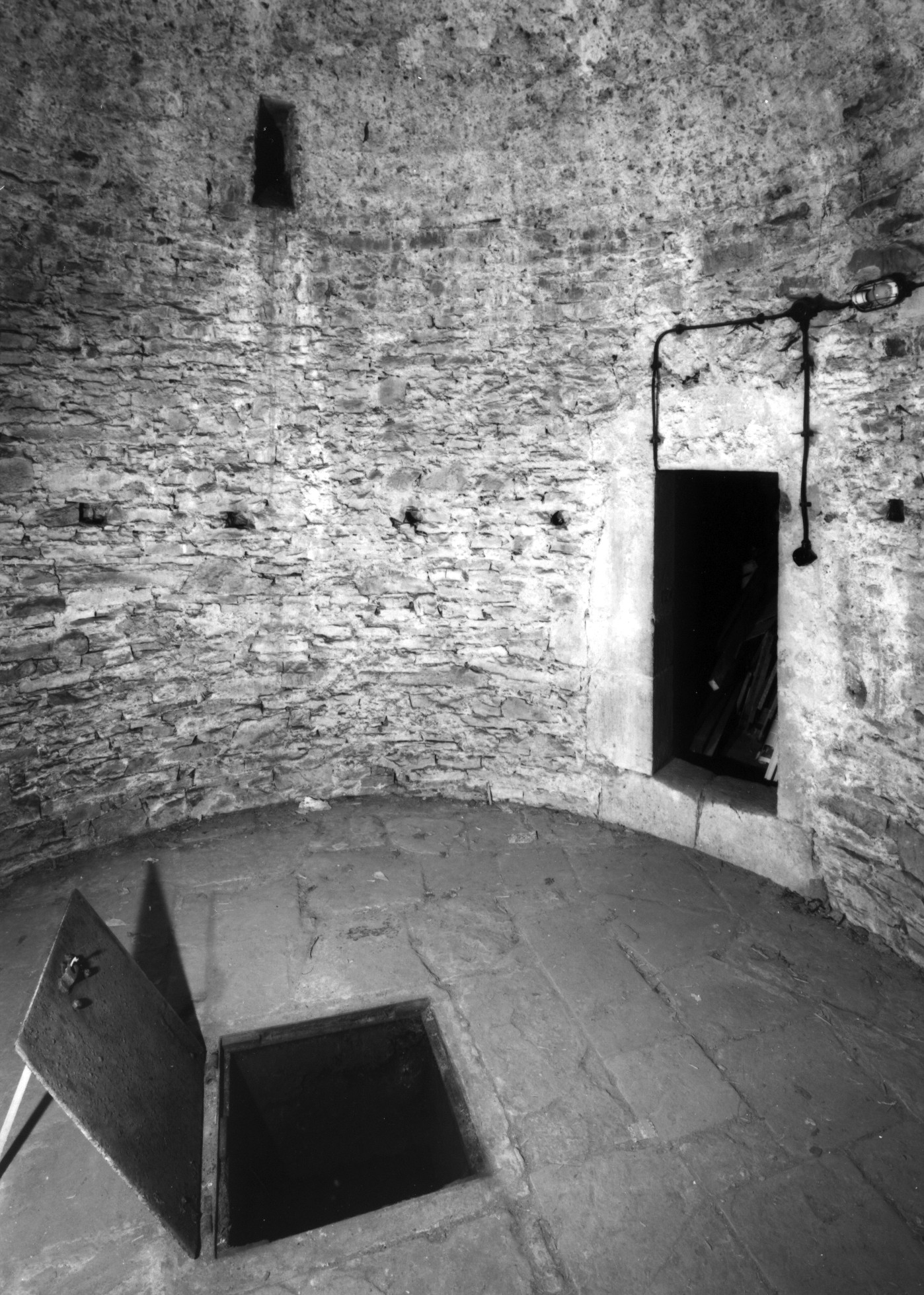
An Angstloch at Wildenburg Castle

An Angstloch is usually located above the basement of a fighting tower or Bergfried. The description of these basement rooms as "dungeons" stems from the romanticised castle studies of the 19th century. There is no evidence to indicate that prisoners were actually lowered through the Angstloch into the dungeon using a rope or rope ladder as these 19th century accounts suggest. Archaeological finds, by contrast, indicate the use of these basement spaces as store rooms. For example, piles of stones have been found in such rooms that suggest they were used as a store for projectiles to be used in time of siege.

== Literature ==
- Binding, Günther (1987), Architektonische Formenlehre (in German), Darmstadt, Germany: Wissenschaftliche Buchgesellschaft, pp. 191–223, ISBN 3534078616
- Brandstetter, Alois (1986), Die Burg (in German), Residenz Verlag, p. 293, ISBN 3701704309
- Piper, Otto (1900), Abriss der Burgenkunde, Göschen Collection (in German), vol. 119, G. J. Göschen, pp. 47ff
- ———. Burgenkunde: Bauwesen und Geschichte der Burgen (in German), Weidlich, 1967, p. 664, ISBN 9783803583161
