= Landskrone =

Landskrone may refer to:

- Landskrone (Ahr), a hill in the Ahr Hills, Rhineland-Palatinate, Germany
- Landskrone Rhine Ferry, a ferry between Nierstein and the Kornsand

== See also ==
- Landskron (disambiguation)
- Landskrona, town in Sweden
- Lanškroun, a town in the Czech Republic
