= Munch (surname) =

Munch is a Danish and Norwegian surname, meaning "monk". It may also sometimes be a variant of the German surname Münch, meaning the same. Notable people with this surname include the following:

- Adolph Munch (1829–1901), American businessman and politician
- Andreas Munch (1811–1884), Norwegian poet, novelist, playwright and newspaper editor
- Anna Munch (1856–1932), Norwegian novelist
- Charles Munch (conductor) (1891–1968), Alsatian symphonic conductor and violinist
- Charles Munch (painter) (born 1945), American artist
- Edvard Munch (1863–1944), Norwegian painter best known for The Scream
- Eggert Munch (1685–1764), Norwegian painter
- Emil D. Munch (1831–1887), American businessman and politician
- Peter A. Munch (1908–1984), Norwegian-American sociologist, educator and author
- Peter Andreas Munch (1810–1863), Norwegian medieval historian
- Peter Rochegune Munch (1870–1948), Danish historian and politician
