= Munsch =

Munsch is a surname. Notable people with the surname include:

- Marty Munsch (born 1967), American music producer and recording engineer
- Robert Munsch (born 1945), Canadian children's author
- Stuart B. Munsch (born 1962), United States Navy admiral

== See also ==
- Dean Munsch, a character from Scream Queens
- A Bunch of Munsch, an American-Canadian animated anthology television series
- Munch (disambiguation)
