= Neuendorf B =

- Ortsteil of Spantekow
- Interactive map of Neuendorf B
- Location within Germany Location within Mecklenburg-Vorpommern
- Coordinates: 53°47′N 13°23′E
- Country: Germany
- State: Mecklenburg-Vorpommern
- District: Vorpommern-Greifswald
- Municipality: Spantekow

Area
  - Total: 13.79 km^{2} (5.32 sq mi)
- Elevation: 14 m (46 ft)

Population (2010-12-31)
  - Total: 168
  - Density: 12.2/km^{2} (31.6/sq mi)
- Time zone: UTC+01:00 (CET)
  - Summer (DST): UTC+02:00 (CEST)
- Postal codes: 17391
- Dialling codes: 039723
- Vehicle registration: VG, formerly OVP
- Website: www.amt-anklam-land.de

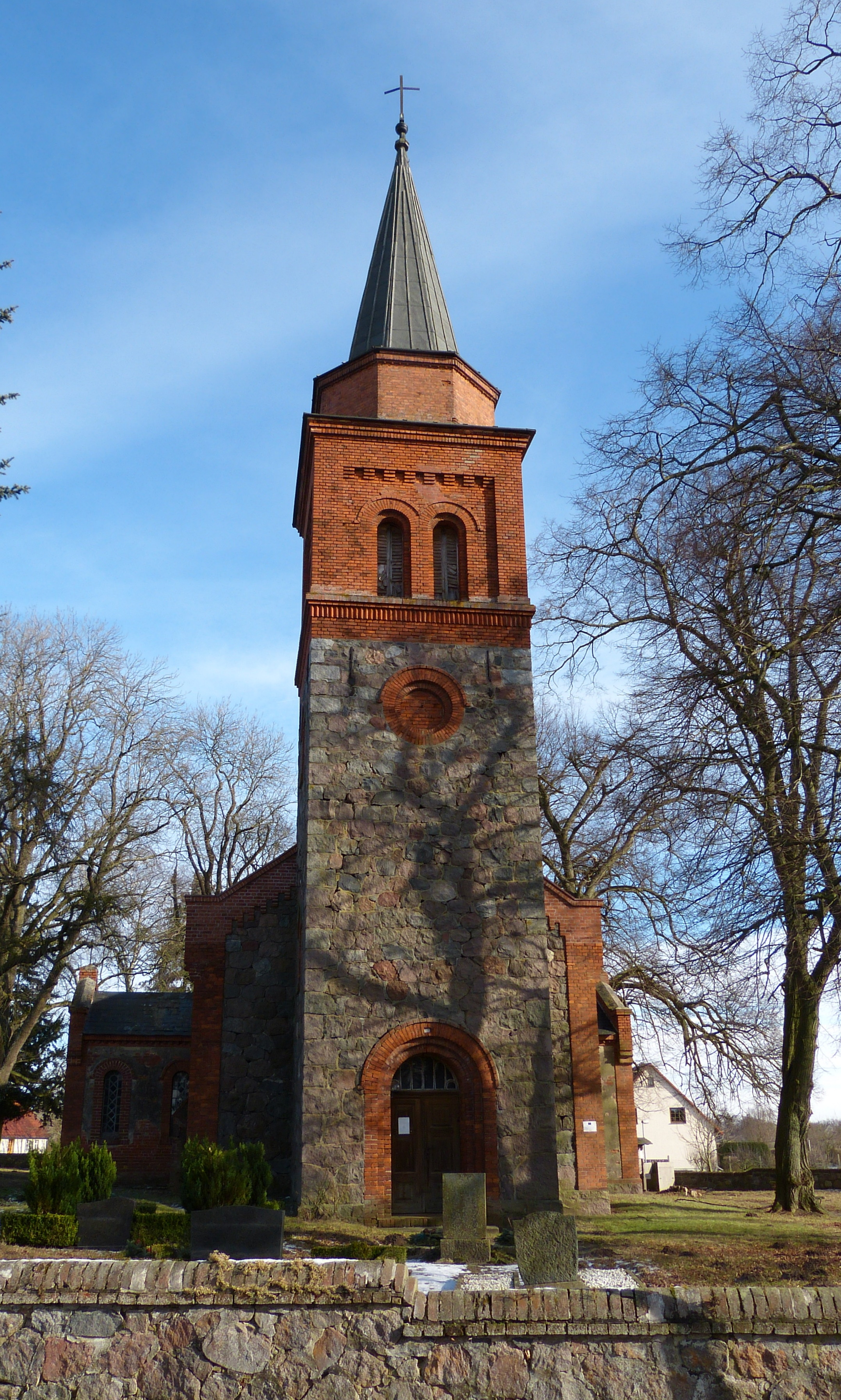
Neuendorf B Church, west side.

Neuendorf B is a village and a former municipality in the Vorpommern-Greifswald district, in Mecklenburg-Vorpommern, Germany. The municipality consisted of the villages of Janow and Neuendorf B. In south of Janow there are the ruins of Veste Landskron (also Lanzkron). Since 1 January 2012, it is part of the municipality Spantekow.
