= Spantekow Fortress =

Castle in Germany

Coordinates: 53°47′13″N 13°31′56″E

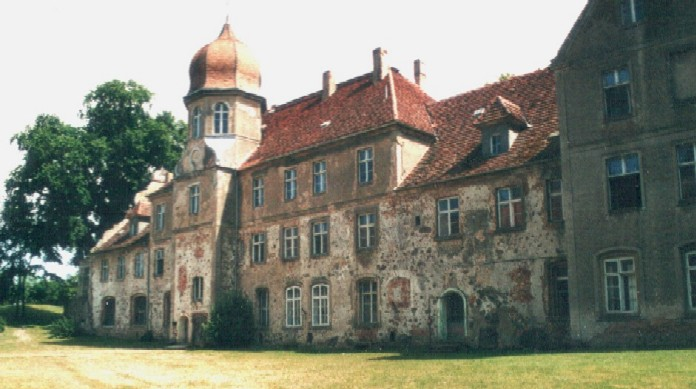
Main building (schloss)

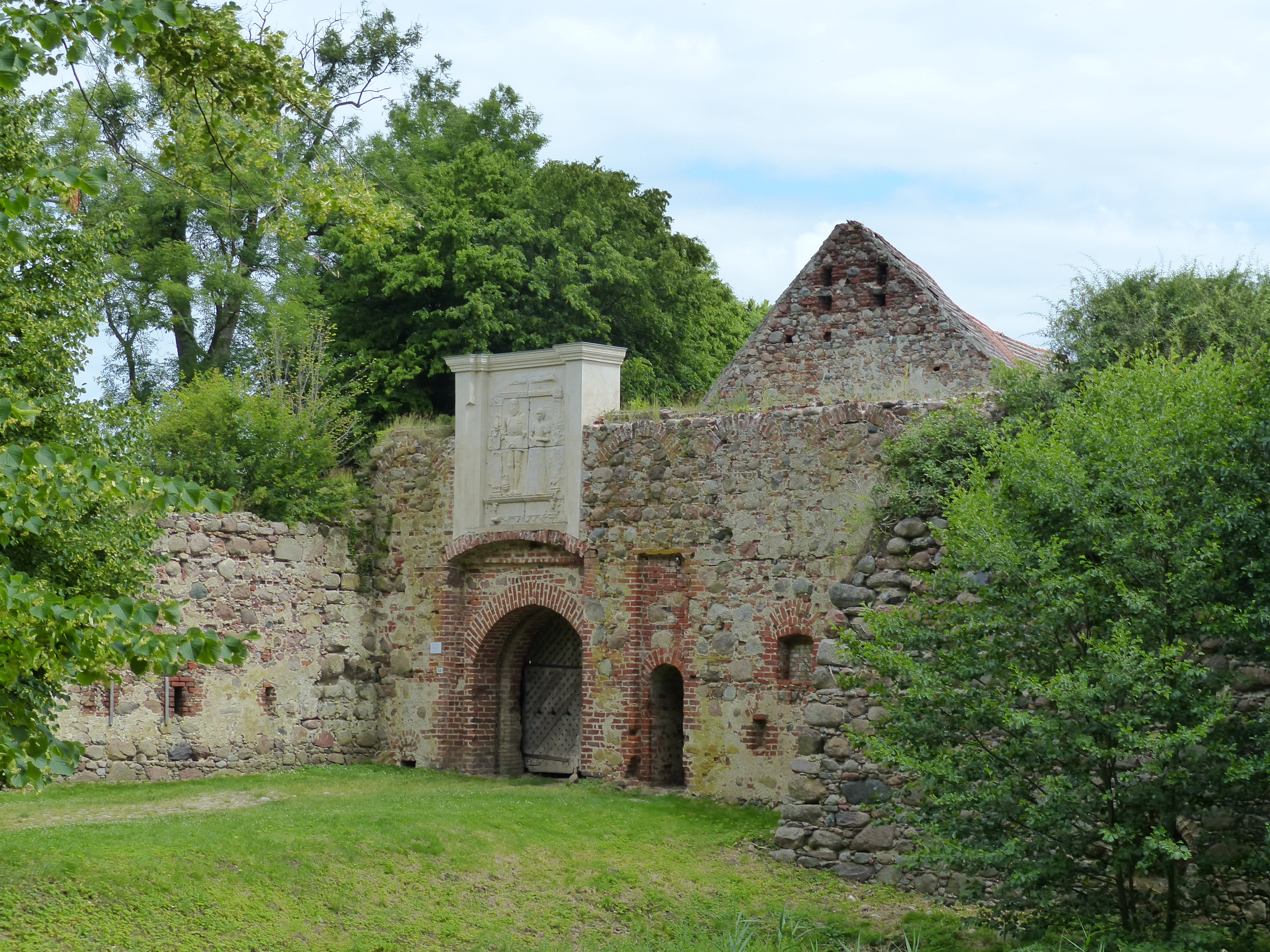
View of the gatehouse

Veste Spantekow is the oldest and most important Renaissance castle in North Germany and is situated in the village of Spantekow, southwest of Anklam in the German state of Mecklenburg-Western Pomerania. It covers an area of c. 4 hectares.

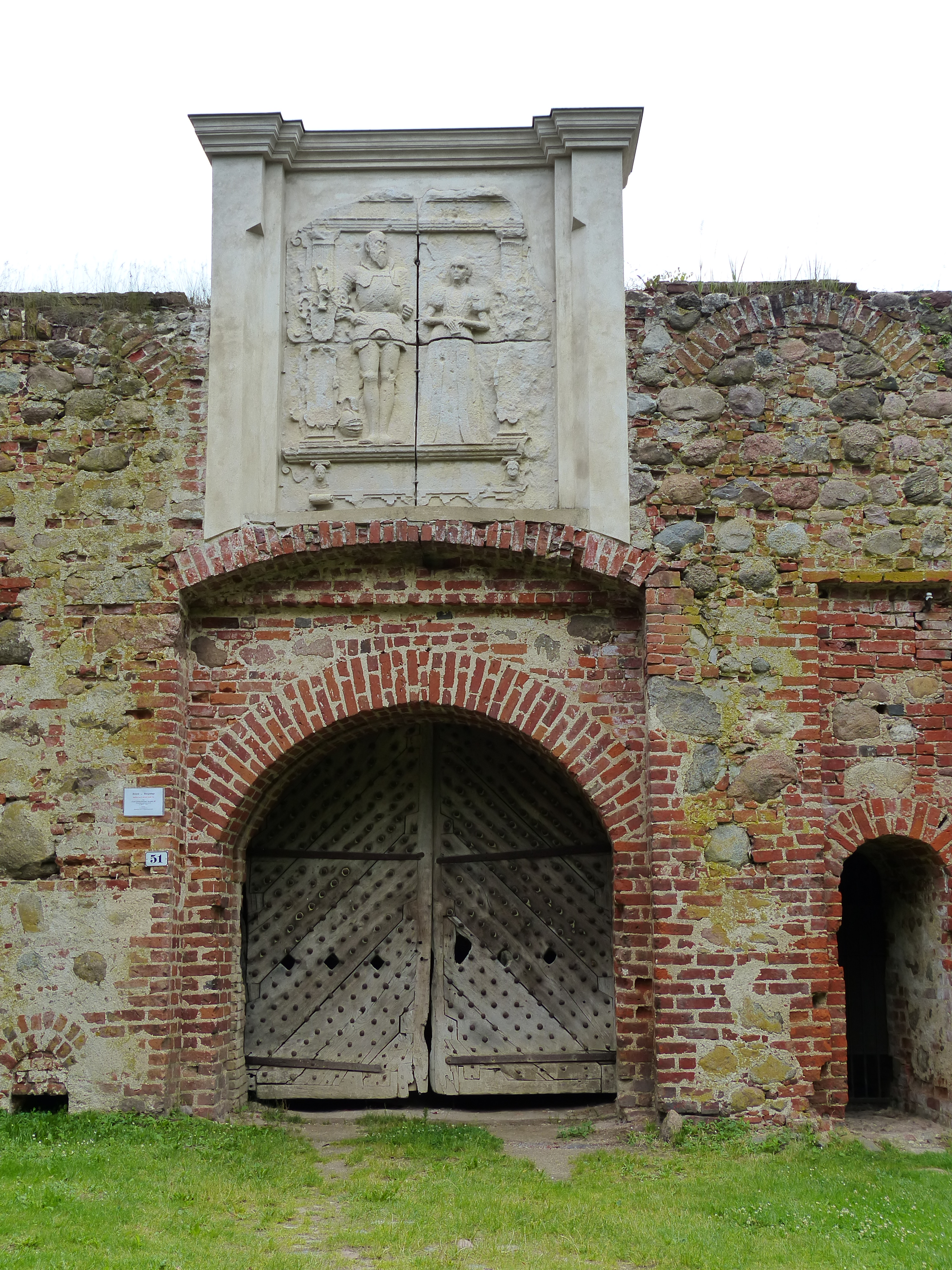
Gatehouse with relief of Ulrich and Anna of Schwerin

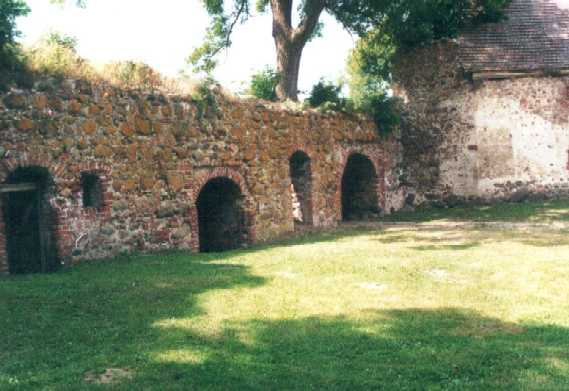
Courtyard view of the Great Casemate

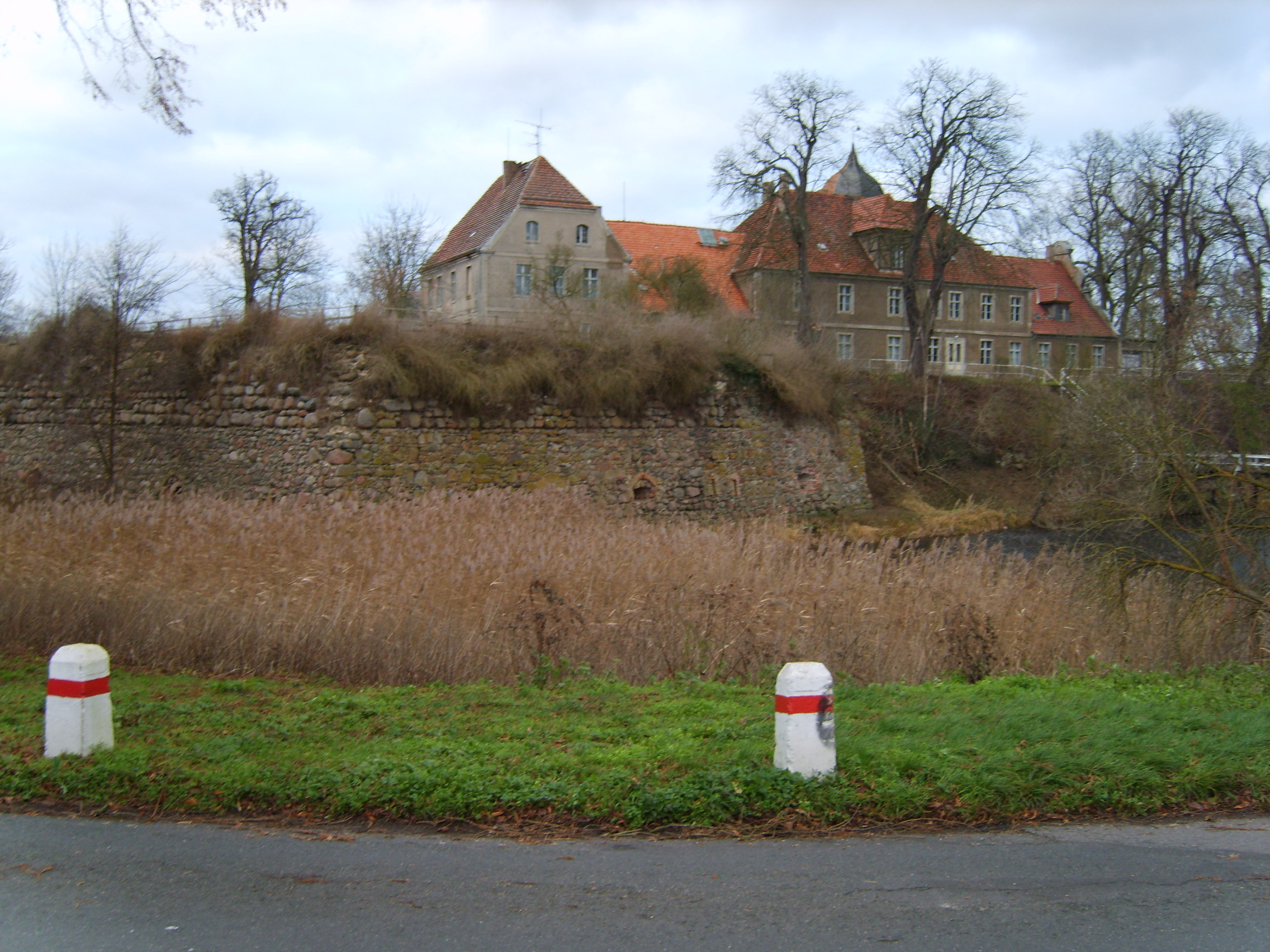
Spantekow Fortress from the east with its schloss and casemates
