= Landskrone (Ahr) =

Hill in Rhineland-Palatinate, Germany

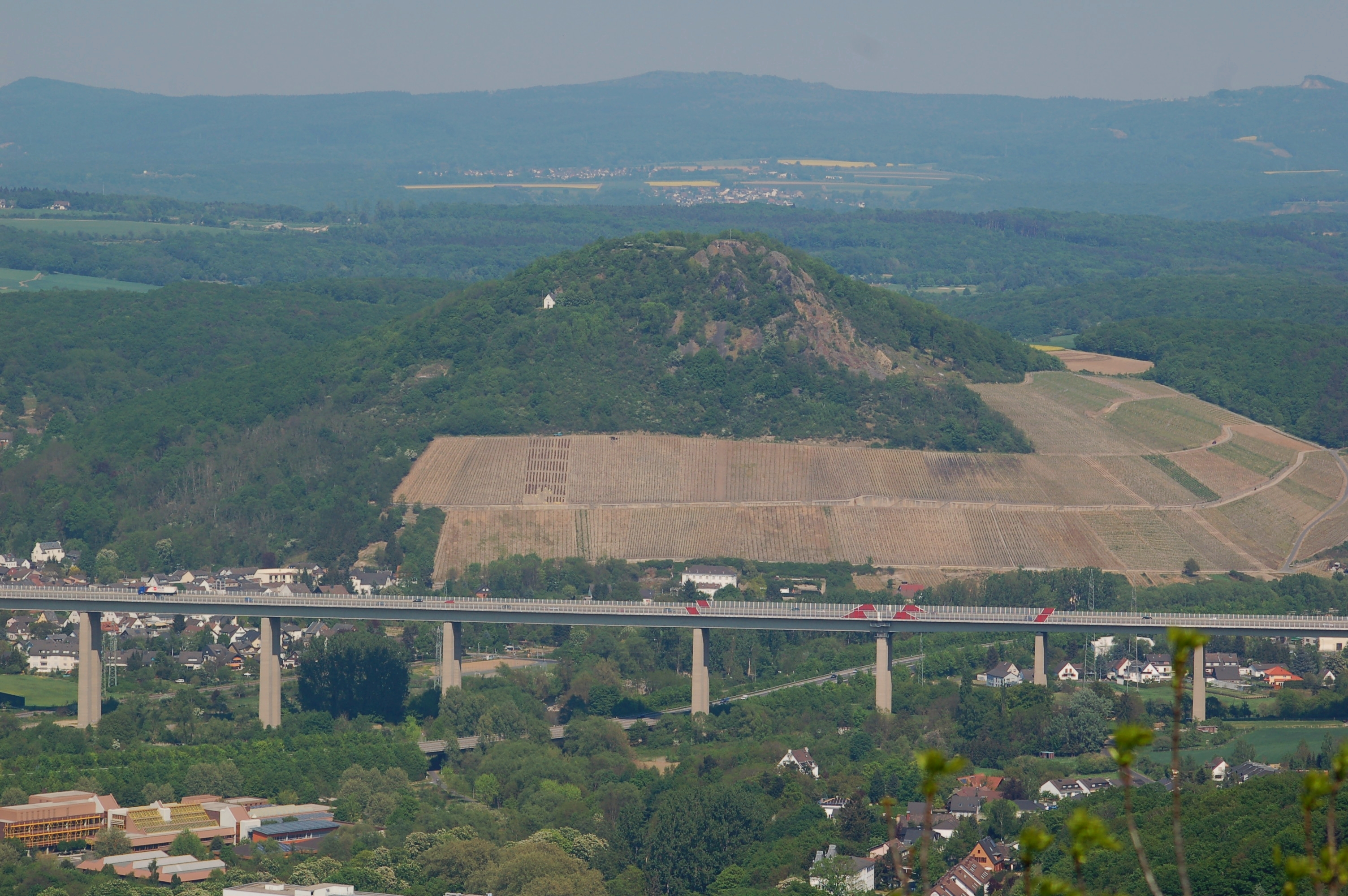
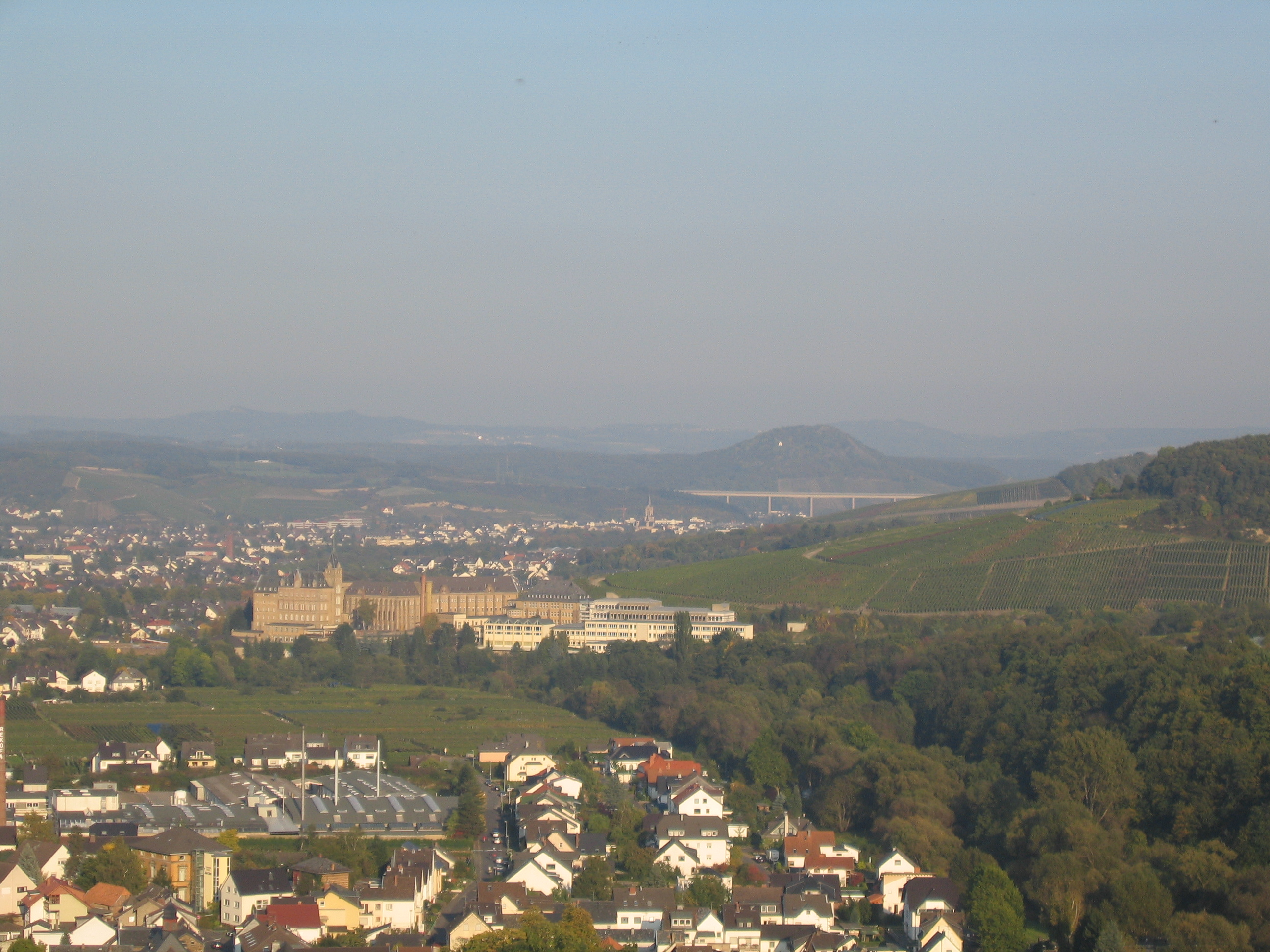
- View from Langer Köbes viewing tower on the Neuenahrer Berg looking northeast over the Ahr Viaduct on the A 61 to the Landskrone The Landskrone in 2005 with the Ahr Viaduct on the A 61 and Kalvarienberg Abbey (front) in Bad Neuenahr-Ahrweiler

Highest point
- Elevation: 271.7 m above sea level (NHN) (891 ft)
- Coordinates: 50°33′05″N 7°10′21″E

Geography
- Location within Rhineland-Palatinate
- Location: Bad Neuenahr-Ahrweiler, Ahrweiler, Rhineland-Palatinate, Germany
- Parent range: Middle Rhine

Geology
- Mountain type: Conical hill
- Rock type: Basalt

The Landskrone in the borough of Bad Neuenahr-Ahrweiler in the German state of Rhineland-Palatinate is a hill, 271.7 m above sea level (NHN), in the Middle Rhine area. It used to be called the Gimmiger Berg and Gymmicher Kupp, but is now named after the ruins of the imperial castle of Landskron which are found on its heights. On the western hillside of the Landskrone is the Chapel of Our Lady of Perpetual Succour (Maria-Hilf-Kapelle) or St. Mary's Chapel (Marienkapelle).

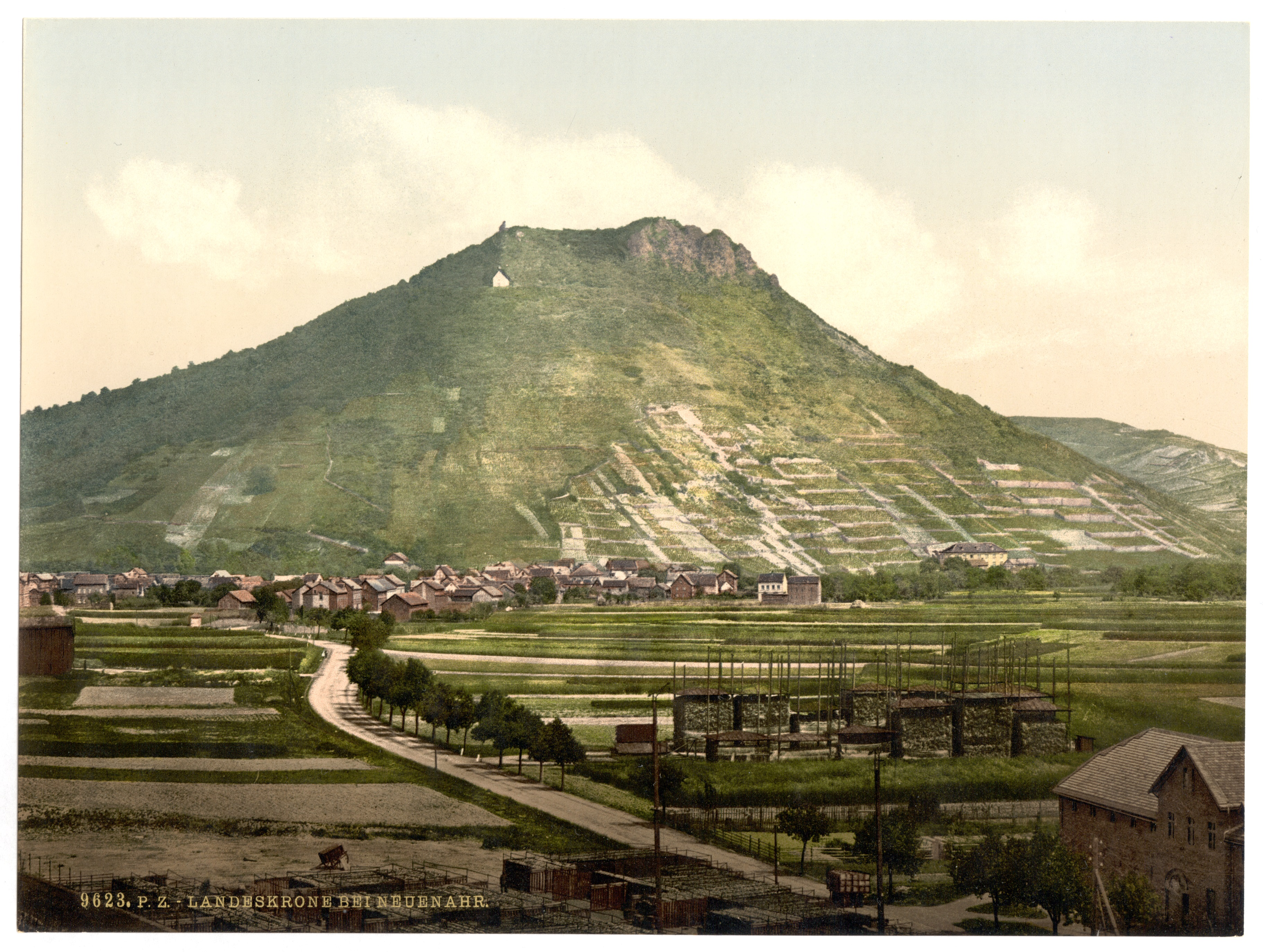
The Landskrone around 1900 with the village of Heppingen and St. Mary's Chapel on its western flanks

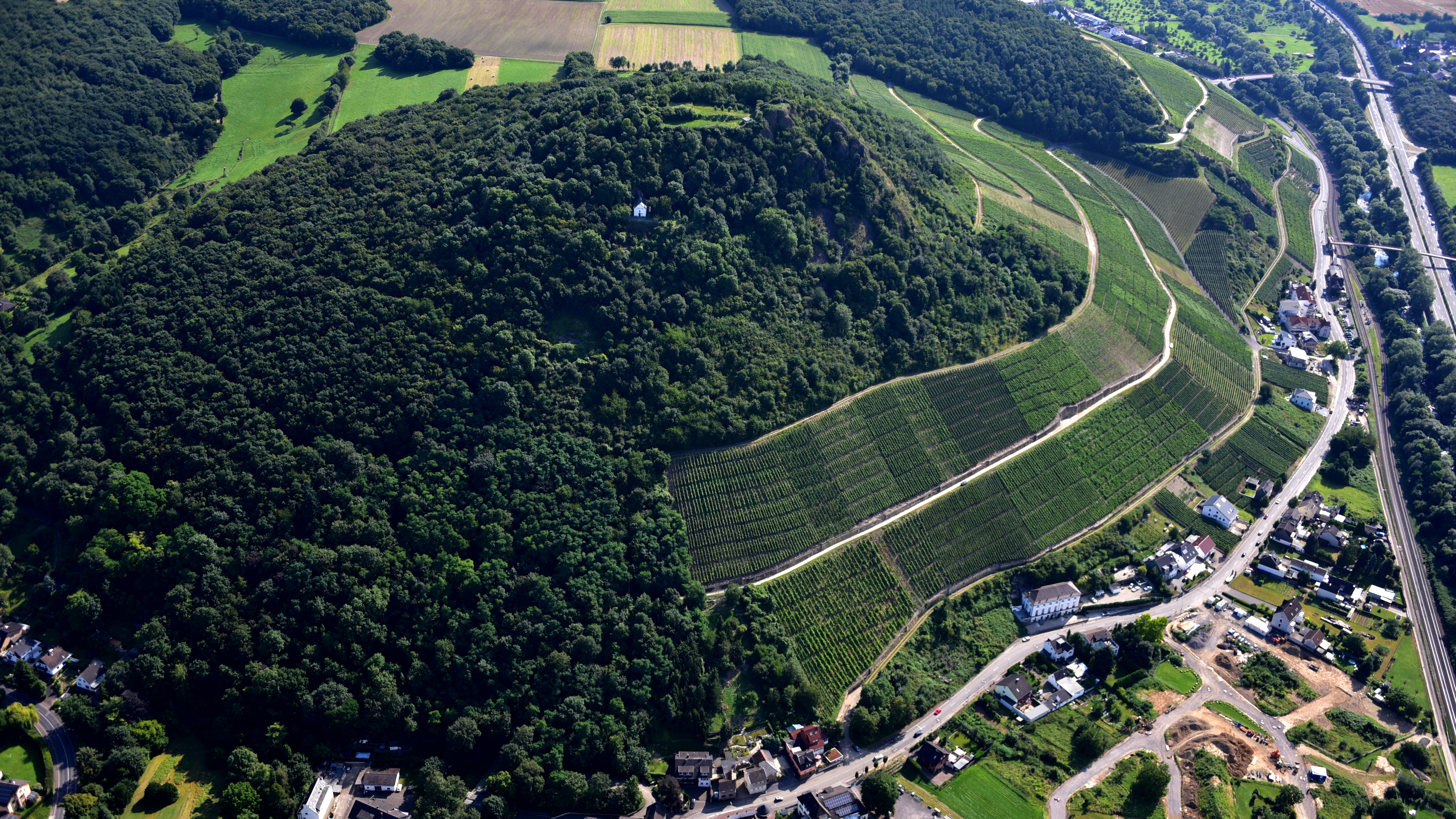
Landskrone, 2016 aerial photograph

== Geography ==
The Landskrone is part of the northern foothills of the lower Ahr Valley. It lies east of Bad Neuenahr between Gimmigen in the north-northwest and Heppingen in the west, Heimersheim in the south and Lohrsdorf in the east, all belonging to the borough of Bad Neuenahr-Ahrweiler. To the south the River Ahr flows past from east to west, which is joined by the Leimersdorfer Bach (Heppinger Bach) to the southwest and to the Lohrsdorfer Bach to the east-southeast.
