= Münchenstein Castle =

Castle in Münchenstein, Switzerland

- Münchenstein
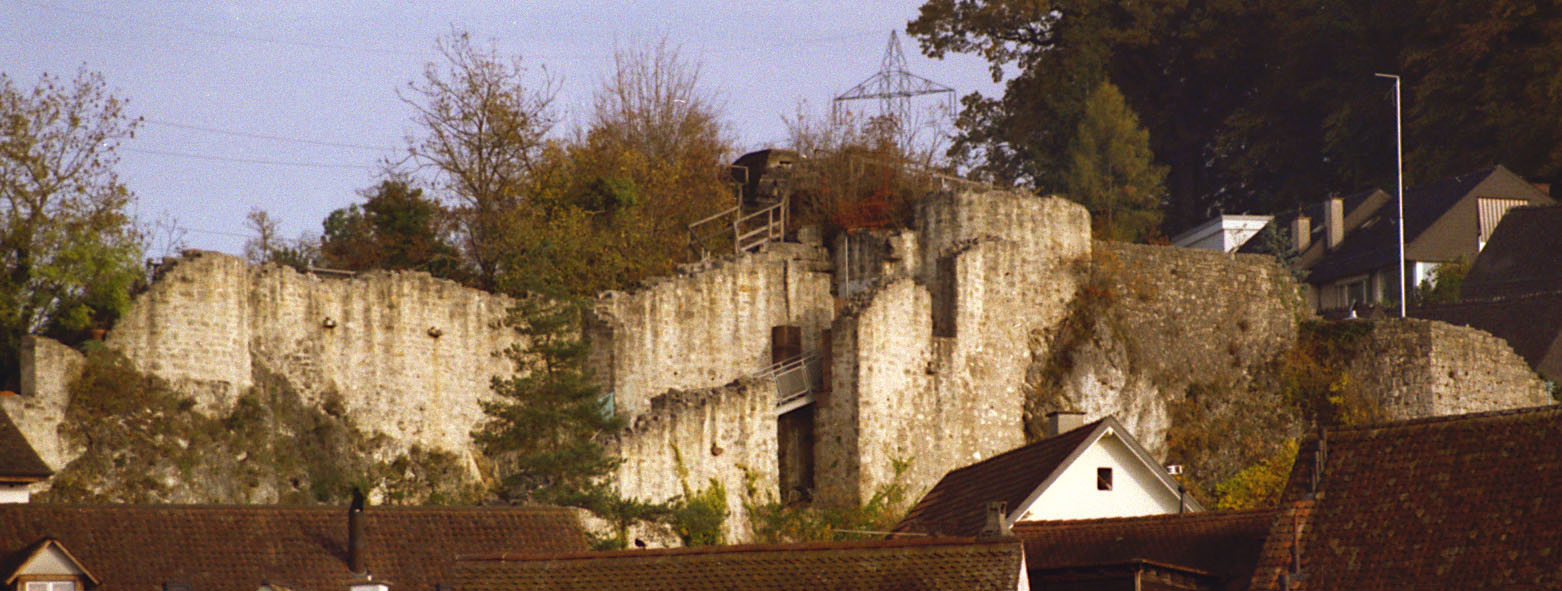
- The ruins of Münchenstein Castle

Site information
- Type: hill castle
- Code: CH-BL
- Condition: ruin

Location
- Coordinates: 47°30′45.22″N 07°37′17.1″E

Site history
- Built: likely 1260 to 1275

Garrison information
- Occupants: Ministerialis

Münchenstein Castle (German: Ruine Münchenstein) is a landmark above the village centre of Münchenstein, in the canton of Basel-Land in Switzerland. The ruins of the castle can still be visited and viewed, but are under private ownership.

== Location ==
The ruins of Münchenstein Castle are situated on a long, but narrow rock. There are only slender remains of the walls to be seen, these are directly above the centre of the village. The ruins of the castle can still be visited and viewed, but are under private ownership.

== History ==
Up until the foundation and the erection of the castle, the small residential colony only had a few houses and was named Geckingen. The first historical records in written form was in 1196 and the colony was named as Kekingen.

Around the year 1260, the up-rising cavalier family Münch acquired the village on the hills adjacent to the river Birs and established their estate there. The exact dates of the castle erection remains unclear, but most likely building began in the time between 1260 and 1270.

The founders of the castle on the rock were the father and son Hugo II Münch and Hugo III Münch. Then, under Hugo Münch IV, the castle was expanded and extended and a ring wall was built around the village during the following 60 years. The cavalier Münch named themselves henceforth Münch von Münchenstein. After 1279 the village Geckingen was called Münchenstein. The Münchs were not able to keep the village and castle for long as their own property. During 1280 they had to hand over the ownership to the Graf von Pfirt, who then lent it to the Münchs in fief.

In March 1324, after the death of the last Graf on Pfirt, Ulrich III, the castle and the village of Münchenstein was inherited by the Herzog of Austria, as heiress Johanna von Pfirt (Jeanne de Ferrette) (1300–1351) was married to Herzog Albrecht II von Habsburg (1298–1358).

In the year 1334, the castle was completed and was at its largest. A few years later, the castle was damaged by the Basel earthquake on 18 October 1356, but it was soon restored to its original condition. At this time Konrad VIII (1324–1378), son of Hartmann I Münch von Münchenstein resided in Münchenstein castle. Konrad VIII (called "Hape") married Katharina, the hereditary daughter from Löwenburg, in 1340. Katharina Münch von Münchenstein-Löwenberg died in 1371 and Konrad VIII inherited governance of Muttenz and the three fortresses in the district Wartenburg.

During the "Old Zürich War" (Alemannic German: Alte Zürichrieg), just before the Battle of St. Jakob an der Birs on 26 August 1444, the Solothurner conquered the castle on 17 June 1444 and they kept it occupied. Not until the year 1469 did the Münchs get their estate back. During 1470, Konrad Münch von Münchenstein had to sell the deeds to the city of Basel, but because he was the city reeve, he was allowed to live there in fief.

During the first half of the 15th century, the dynasty of the Münchs began to crumble, and because of the high fiefdom costs, they had to sell the estate to the city. The village and castle were reigned for 283 years by the city of Basel. This reign ended, however, after the French Revolution and village and castle were sold to the municipality Münchenstein, who themselves sold (passed on) the properties to the villagers. The castle was also sold and used as a stone quarry to build new houses.

== See also ==
- List of castles in Switzerland

== Literature ==
- Werner Meyer: Burgen von A bis Z. Burgenlexikon der Regio. Druck und Verlag. Basel 1981
