= Hartung Münch =

Bishop of Basel

Hartung Münch von Landskron (c. 1265 – 25 October 1332) was bishop of Basel from 1325 to 1328.

== Early life ==
Hartung Münch was born about 1265, son of the Mayor of Basel Heinrich I. and Werentrudis von Wangen.

== Literatur ==
- René Teuteberg: Basler Geschichte, 2nd edition, Christoph Merian Verlag, Basel 1988, ISBN 3-85616-034-5, p. 112.
- Aryeh Grabois: Enzyklopädie des Mittelalters. Atlantis Verlag, Zürich (no year, about 1988), ISBN 3-7611-0726-9, p. 27.
