= Münch (family lineage) =

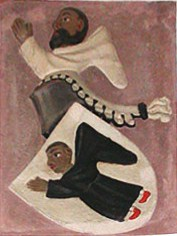
- Arms on the tomb of Konrad Münch von Landskron (died 1371)

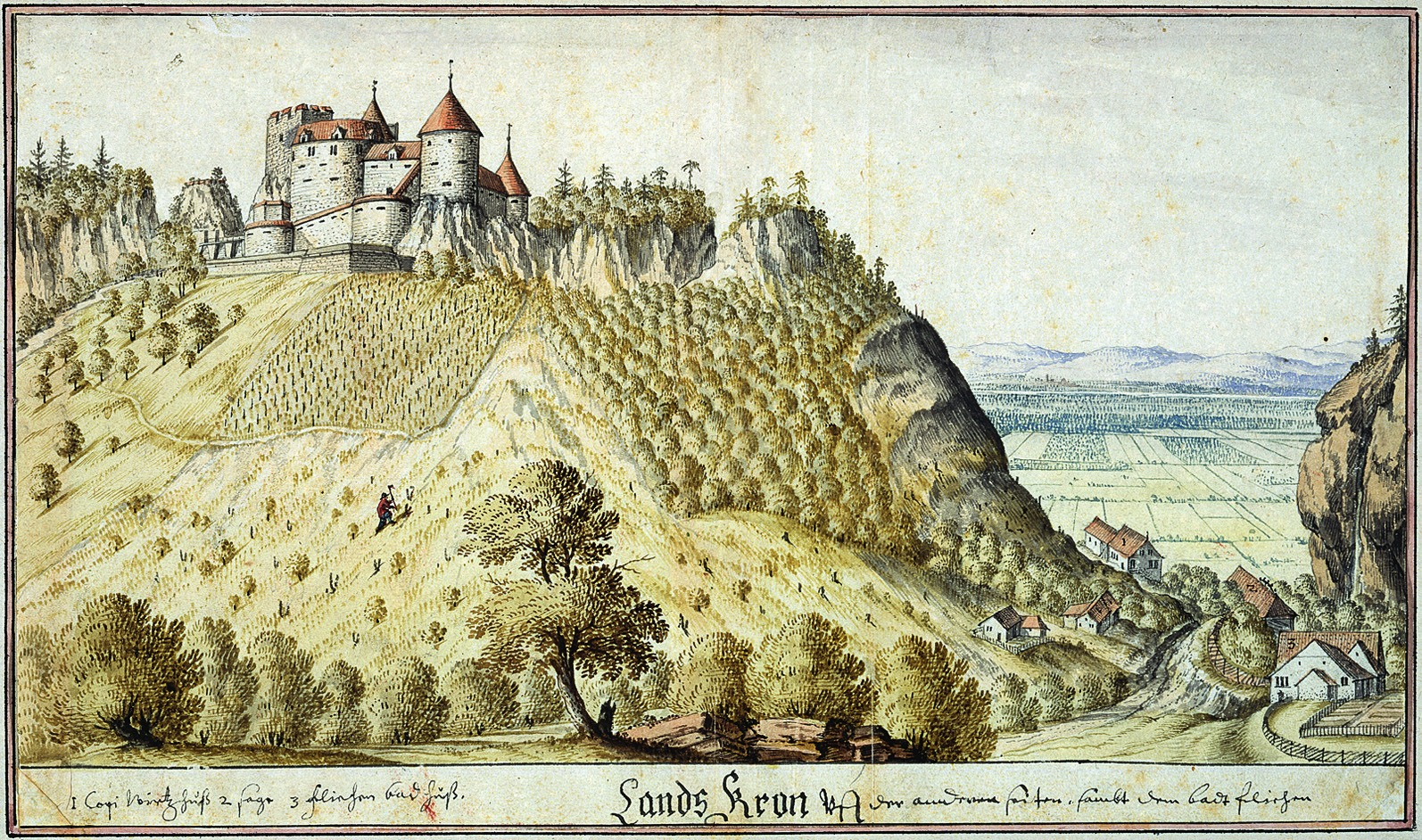
- Château du Landskron, Alsace; watercolour by Albrecht Kauw, c. 1670
- Current region: Switzerland
- Origin: Prince-Bishopric of Basel
- Members: Hartung Münch von Landskron; Hartmann Münch von Münchenstein

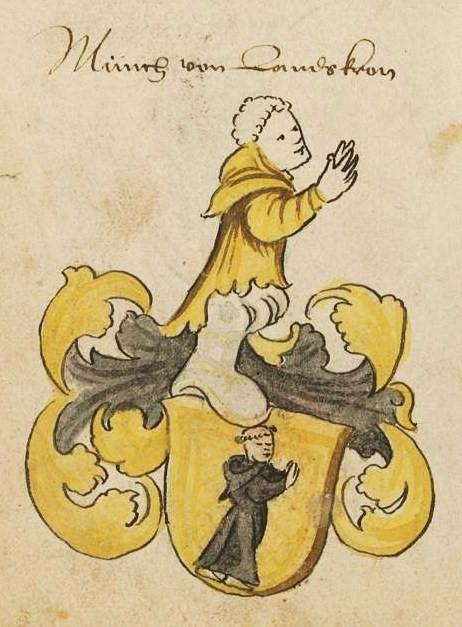
Arms of Münch von Landskron in the Wappenbuch of Nikolaus Bertschi, Augsburg 1515

The Münch were a Swiss knightly family in the city of Basel and its environs. The first mention of the family dates from 1154; it died out in 1759. In the thirteenth century it was, with the Schaler family, one the most influential families in Basel. From about the end of the fourteenth century members of the family took no further part in the political life of the city.

== History ==
The earliest mention of the family dates from 1154, when a Münch was in the service of the Prince-Bishop of Basel.

During the thirteenth century members of the family built a number of castles in the country surrounding Basel, and these gave rise to a variety of branches of the family. Some of these were soon extinguished – the Münch of Stettenberg disappeared in 1310, and the Münch of Münchsberg followed them in 1356. The two principal lines were the Münch of Landskron, extinguished in 1460, and the Münch of Münchenstein and of Löwenberg, which died out in 1759.

Until the mid-fourteenth century, members of the Landskron branch appear in political positions in the government of Basel, and three of them became Bürgermeister of the city; from that time on they are seen more often as functionaries of the Habsburg court. Hartung Münch von Landskron was bishop of Basel from 1325 to 1328, and Konrad occupied the same seat from 1393 to 1395. The last of the line was Johans XI, who died in 1460; his brother Burkart VII had died at the Battle of St. Jakob an der Birs in 1444.

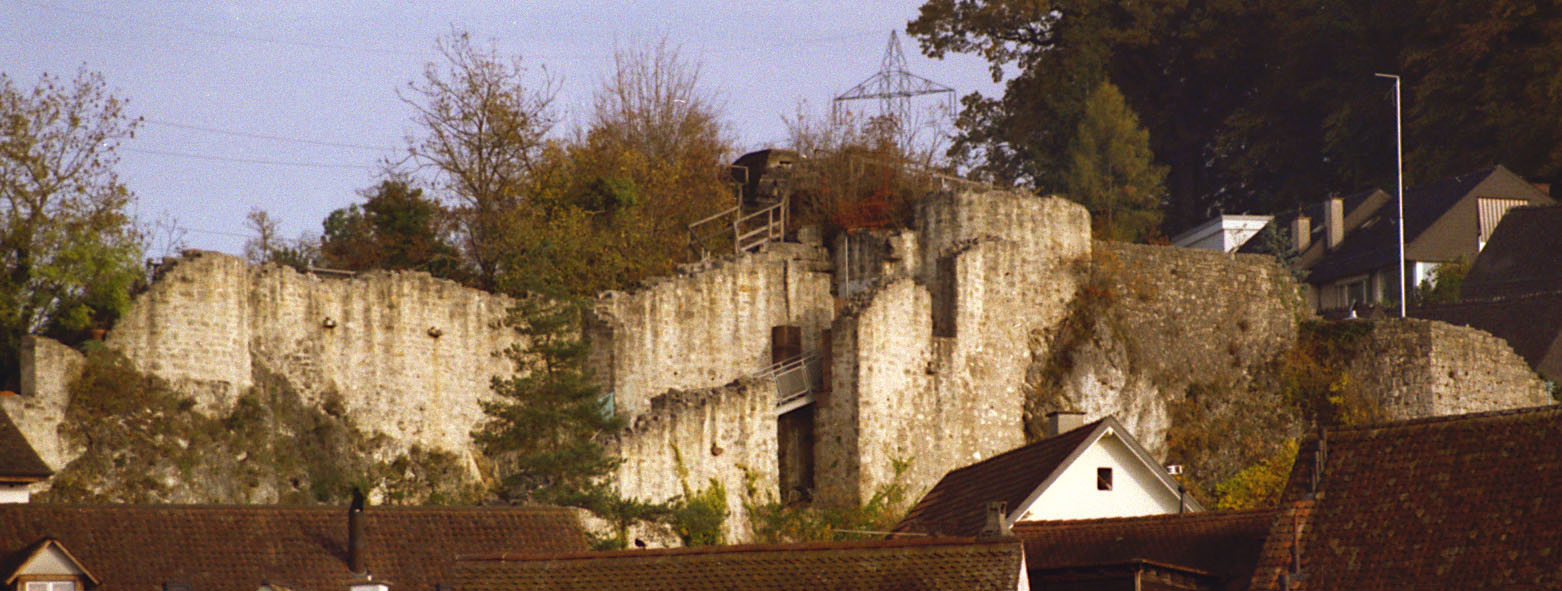
The ruins of Burg Münchenstein

The castle of Burg Münchenstein was built between approximately 1260 and 1275 by Hugo III. The Münch von Münchenstein were active in the politics of Basel until about the end of the fourteenth century, but not thereafter. Hartmann Münch von Münchenstein was bishop of Basel from 1418 until 1422. In the fifteenth century the family ran into financial trouble: Konrad VIII mortgaged Burg Münchenstein in 1470, and in 1526 the lordship of Löwenberg was sold to the Abbey of Lucelle. The Münchenstein branch of the family was extinguished in 1759.
