= Spantekow =

- Municipality
- Location of Spantekow within Vorpommern-Greifswald district
- Interactive map of Spantekow
- Location within Germany Location within Mecklenburg-Vorpommern
- Coordinates: 53°47′N 13°32′E
- Country: Germany
- State: Mecklenburg-Vorpommern
- District: Vorpommern-Greifswald
- Municipal assoc.: Anklam-Land
- Subdivisions: 3

Government
  - Mayor: Gerold Klien

Area
  - Total: 70.45 km^{2} (27.20 sq mi)
- Elevation: 17 m (56 ft)

Population (2025-12-31)
  - Total: 1,010
  - Density: 14.3/km^{2} (37.1/sq mi)
- Time zone: UTC+01:00 (CET)
  - Summer (DST): UTC+02:00 (CEST)
- Postal codes: 17392
- Dialling codes: 039727
- Vehicle registration: VG
- Website: www.amt-anklam-land.de

Spantekow is a municipality in the Vorpommern-Greifswald district, in Mecklenburg-Vorpommern, Germany. It comprises the villages Dennin, Drewelow, Fasanenhof, Janow, Japenzin, Neuendorf B, Rehberg, Rebelow and Spantekow.

== History ==
Since the Middle Ages, Spantekow is a local administrative center and the site of a fortress. Though Spantekow castle was largely destroyed in a Brandenburgian attack in 1677, it remained a residence of the local nobility until 1945. Today, the village is seat of the Amt Anklam-Land.

From 1648 to 1720, Spantekow was part of Swedish Pomerania. From 1720 to 1945, it was part of the Prussian Province of Pomerania, from 1945 to 1952 of the State of Mecklenburg-Vorpommern, from 1952 to 1990 of the Bezirk Neubrandenburg of East Germany and since 1990 again of Mecklenburg-Vorpommern.
