= Château de Landskron =

Castle in Alsace, France

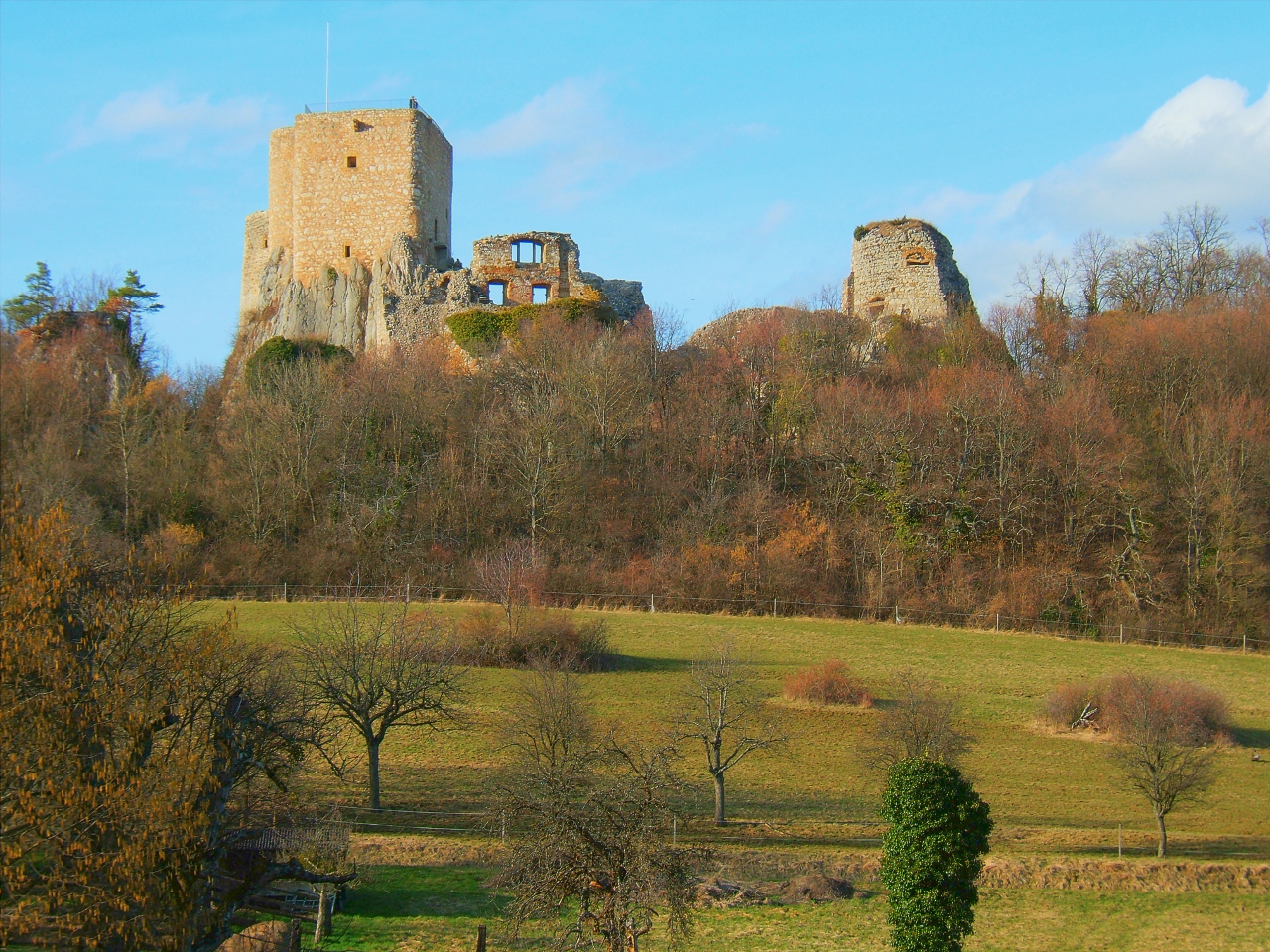
- Ruins of Château de Landskron seen from Tannwald

- Location within France
- 47°29′18″N 7°29′26″E
- Type: Castle

History
- Built: 13th century
- Original use: Castle
- Rebuilt: 17th century

Site notes
- Architectural style: Medieval
- Current use: Ruins

Monument historique
- Designated: 1923

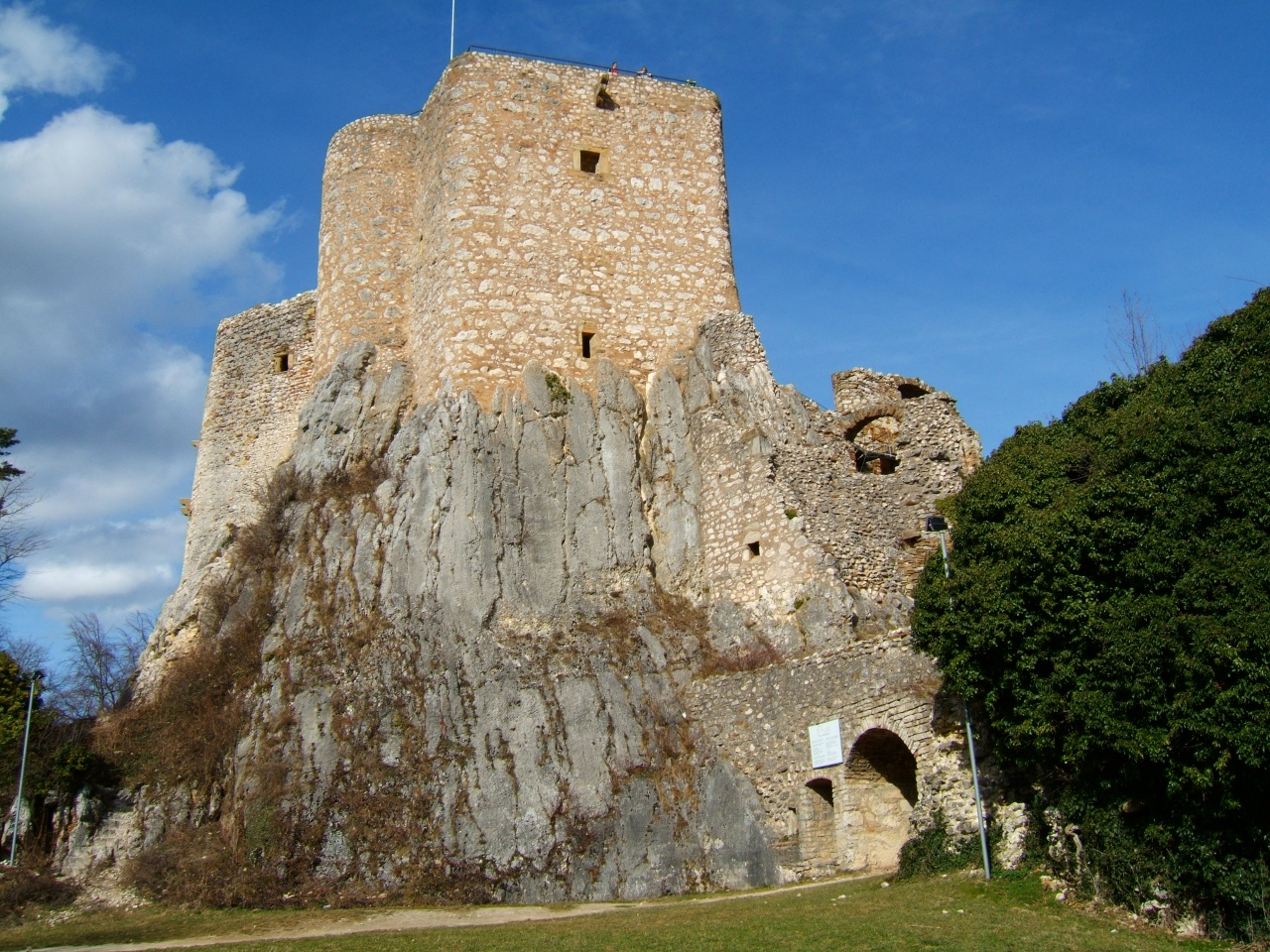
Rectangular keep of Castle Landskron

The Château de Landskron (or Landskron Castle) is situated in the southern part of Alsace, in the east of France, mere footsteps away from Switzerland, in the commune of Leymen. The village situated at the north of the ruin, Leymen, in the département of Haut-Rhin, lies in France while Flüh, at the south east foot of the ruin, is in Switzerland.

The castle was built before 1297. It had a very important strategic position in that it allowed the control of the Eastern Sundgau, the elbow of the Rhine and the city of Basel. Several disputes concerning the ownership have been reported. Like the Château de Ferrette and Château de Morimont, the Château de Landskron was owned by Habsburg for a time. In 1462, the castle was given to the Lord of the Bailiwick of Lupfen, Sébastien de Reichenstein, who later enlarged and transformed the castle to adapt it to firearms in 1516. In 1648, by the Peace of Westphalia which ended the Thirty Years' War, the lands and lordships of the Habsburgs in Alsace, including the Château de Landskron, passed into the hands of the King of France. After 1665, Vauban was responsible for rebuilding the castle into a military garrison, while many other Alsatian castles were abandoned and gradually destroyed. In the 1690s, it was used as a state prison. The few prisoners who were imprisoned there until the French Revolution were predominantly political prisoners and the mentally ill. Bernard Duvergez, a courtier at the French court, was held there from 1769 until 1790 when he was discovered by revolutionaries looking for political prisoners. He died while waiting for them to find him a better place. He is the subject of a local novel, The Prisoner of Landskron

The castle survived the Revolution, whereas the houses of the wealthy in Leyman were burned. The castle was destroyed in 1813 by the Austrian and the Bavarian armies fighting Napoléon Bonaparte.

After that time it was a ruin. In the 1970s, the former owners installed a colony of monkeys into the ruins. Since 1984, the castle has belonged to the Association pour la Sauvegarde du Château de Landskron (Association for the Protection of Landskron Castle) and was partly restored in 1996. Further restoration work is planned.

One of the main characteristics of the castle is its big rectangular tower or keep.

The Château de Landskron has been classed as a monument historique by the French Ministry of Culture since 1923.

== See also ==
- List of castles in France
