= Assault on Greifswald =

Allied assaults on Greifswald in 1659 during the Second Northern War

- Part of the Second Northern War
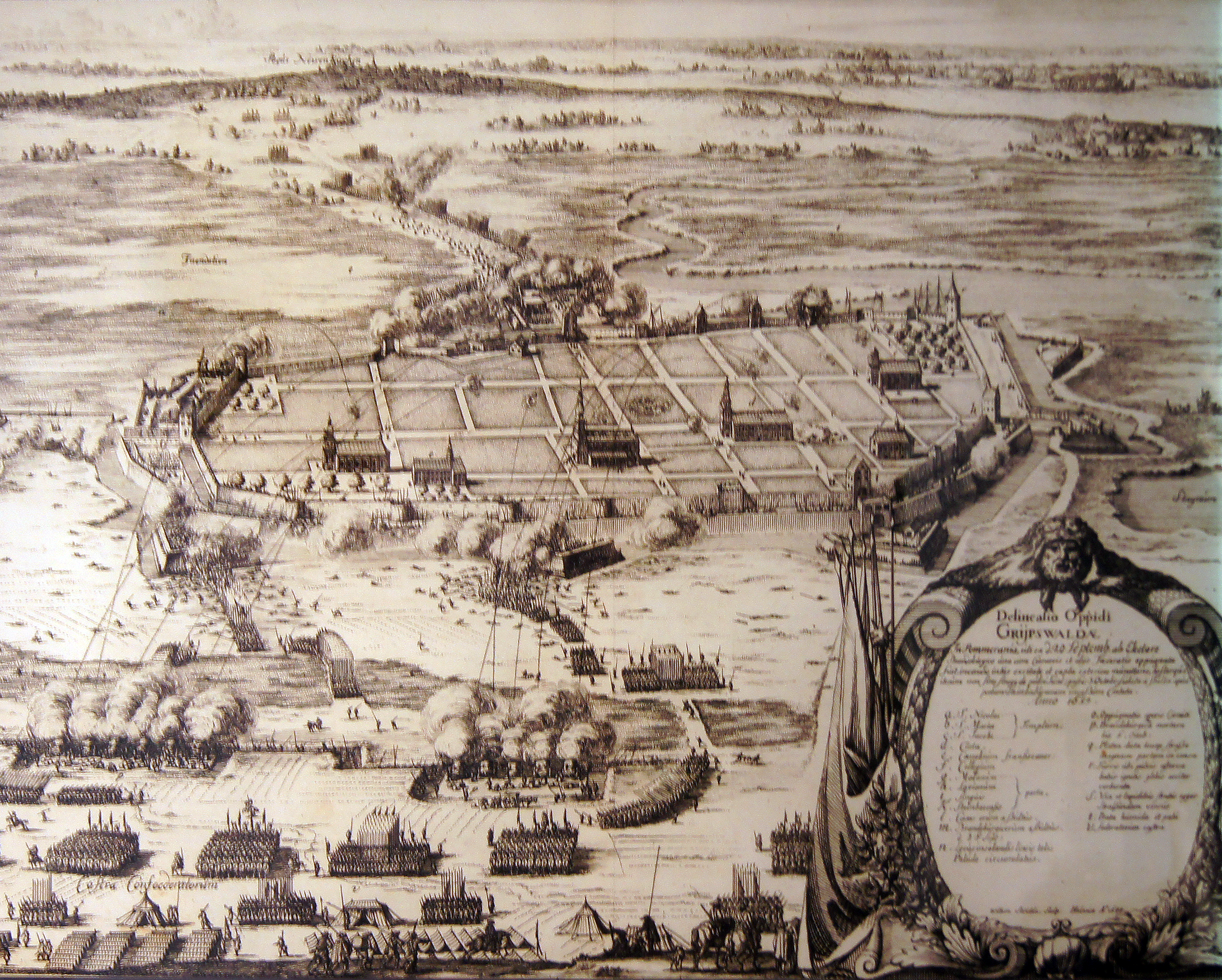
- Engraving of the assault by Wilhelm Swidde
Date	22–28 September 1659
Location	Greifswald, Swedish Pomerania 54°5′N 13°23′E
Result	Swedish victory

Belligerents
(yes) Swedish Empire	Brandenburg; Austria

Commanders and leaders
(yes) Burchard Müller	Frederick William

Units involved
(yes) Greifswald garrison	Unknown

Strength
400 men	1,500 men

Casualties and losses
Unknown	500 killed, wounded, or captured

The assault on Greifswald occurred from 22 to 28 August 1659 as part of the allied offensive into Swedish Pomerania during the Second Northern War. On 22 August, an allied Austro–Brandenburger force of 1,500 men under the command of Frederick Willaim reached Greifswald, storming it in the evening. However, they were repelled by the Swedish garrison under Burchard Müller. After failing to convince the burgher population in the city to surrender, Frederick stormed the city again. The second assault failed as well, and he withdrew, suffering 500 casualties. The attacks on Greifswald had the consequence of tying down allied forces and thus saving other Swedish fortifications in Pomerania.

== Background ==
On 8 August 1659, during the early stages of the Allied offensive into Swedish Pomerania during the Second Northern War, around 18,000 men under the command of Frederick William left Jutland, leaving behind 6,000 men. They marched across Flensburg, Schleswig, Rendsburg, and Hohenwestedt towards Hamburg. From here, they continued through Mecklenburg, capturing Warnemünde.

After capturing Tribsees, Klempenow, Loitz, and Damgarten, a force of 1,500 Brandenburgian and Austrian troops continued towards Greifswald.

== Assault ==
On 22 August, the Austro–Brandenburger vanguard reached the city, assaulting it in the evening. Frederick led troops to storm the so-called Fat Gate and set the city on fire. However, they were soon repelled with a sortie by the Swedish garrison of 250 cavalry and 150 infantry under the command of Burchard Müller. During the night, the main force arrived, and they began bombarding the city on 23 August. The bombardment continued throughout the day except for short interruptions with 16 buildings catching fire. Due to the bombardment, so-called "angry confusion" arose among Greifswald's inhabitants.

In the evening, the Allies began a storming of the city. However, the Swedish garrison, unsupported by the burghers inside, managed to force the allies to pull back. However, the people in Greifswald were so fear stricken that the magistrate send a delegation to Frederick William during the night to ask for mercy. This wish was granted, on the condition that the city would surrender within 24 hours. However, when Müller found out about the agreement, he managed to force the burghers to hold out, and the promise to surrender was never fulfilled. They informed Frederick that they were obligated to stay loyal due to the Westphalian peace, and that they had been assigned to Sweden with his consent.

Thus, a new storming took place between 27 and 28 August. Despite it being more violent than the previous one, the Swedish garrison, now supported by the burgher's, repelled it once more. After the failed storming, the allies decided they were not adequately suited for a siege and withdrew.

== Aftermath ==
Frederick William's casualties during the ordeal have commonly been estimated at 1,000 men or more, were most likely not higher than 500 killed, wounded, or captured. The successful Swedish defense of Greifswald had tied allied forces down, thus saving other Swedish fortificatons in Pomerania.

== See also ==
- Siege of Wolin – 1659 Austrian victory in the Second Northern War
- Siege of Stettin (1659) – Siege in 1659 during the Second Northern War of 1655–1660

== Works cited ==
- Bonnesen, Sten [in Swedish] (1924). Karl X Gustav [Charles X Gustav] (in Swedish). Gleerups.
- Isacson, Claes-Göran (2015). Karl X Gustavs krig: Fälttågen i Polen, Tyskland, Baltikum, Danmark och Sverige 1655-1660 [Wars of Charles X Gustav: The campaigns in Poland, Germany, the Baltics, Denmark and Sweden 1655-1660] (in Swedish). Historiska Media. ISBN 9789175450117.
- Kosegarten, Johann Gottfried Ludwig (1856). Geschichte der Universität Greifswald [History of the University of Greifswald] (in German). Vol. 2. Koch.
