= Northern War of 1655–1660 =

Conflict in Europe

- Part of the Northern Wars
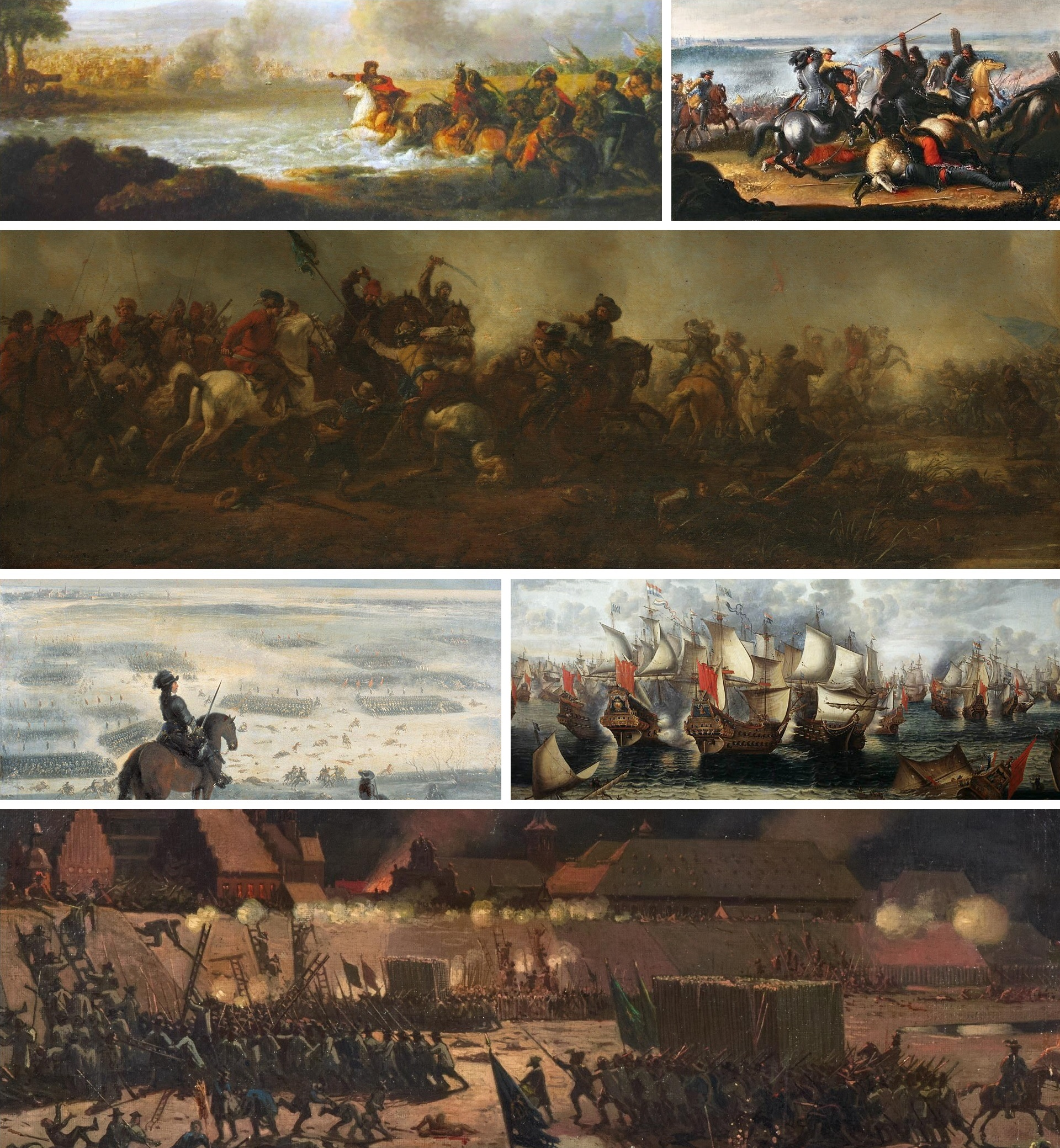
- From left to right: Battle of Warka; Battle of Warsaw; Unknown Polish–Swedish battle; March Across the Belts; Battle of the Sound; Assault on Copenhagen
| Date | June 1655 – 23 April 1660 |
| Location | Denmark–Norway, Swedish Empire, Polish–Lithuanian Commonwealth, New Sweden and New Netherland. |
| Result | See § Peace |
| Territorial changes | Denmark–Norway cedes Scania, Halland, Blekinge, Bohuslän and Ven to Sweden.; Poland–Lithuania recognizes Swedish sovereignty in Livonia and Swedish ownership of Estonia and Ösel; Poland–Lithuania grants the Duchy of Prussia sovereign status.; Dutch annexation of New Sweden. |

Belligerents
| Swedish Empire (Margraviate of Brandenburg) Brandenburg-Prussia (1656–57); Transylvania; Swedish Lithuania; Cossack Hetmanate | Polish–Lithuanian Commonwealth; Denmark–Norway (from 1657); Habsburg Monarchy (Tsardom of Russia) Russia (1656–58) (Margraviate of Brandenburg) Brandenburg-Prussia (1655–56, 1657–60); Crimean Khanate; Dutch Republic |

Commanders and leaders
| (Swedish Empire) Charles X Gustav (Swedish Empire) Arvid Wittenberg # (Swedish Empire) Magnus de la Gardie (Swedish Empire) Carl Gustaf Wrangel; Janusz Radziwiłł # Bogusław Radziwiłł (Margraviate of Brandenburg) Frederick William I (Transylvania) George II; Bohdan Khmelnytsky | (Polish–Lithuanian Commonwealth) John II Casimir (Polish–Lithuanian Commonwealth) Stefan Czarniecki (Polish–Lithuanian Commonwealth) Paweł Jan Sapieha (Polish–Lithuanian Commonwealth) Wincenty Gosiewski (Denmark–Norway) Frederick III (Tsardom of Russia) Alexis of Russia (Margraviate of Brandenburg) Frederick William I (Holy Roman Empire) Jean-Louis de Souches |

Strength
| (Swedish Empire) 55–70,000 (average strength, 1655–1660) | Unknown |

Casualties and losses
| (Swedish Empire) 70,000 dead (excluding mercenaries) | Unknown |

The Northern War of 1655–1660 (Note: Also known as the First, Second or Little Northern War) was fought between the Swedish Empire and the Polish–Lithuanian Commonwealth, with participation at different times by Russia, Brandenburg-Prussia, the Habsburg monarchy, and Denmark–Norway. It ended with the treaties of Copenhagen and Oliva in 1660.

In 1655, Charles X took advantage of the Russo-Polish War (1654–67) to over-run western Poland. The Grand Duchy of Lithuania was annexed by Sweden, and John II Casimir Vasa took refuge in Vienna. He managed to regain parts of his kingdom in 1656, and the conflict widened when Russia declared war on Sweden, supported by Emperor Leopold and Frederick III of Denmark.

Previously allied with Sweden, Brandenburg switched sides in 1657 when Casimir granted Frederick William I sovereignty over the Duchy of Prussia. That winter, Charles X invaded Denmark and forced Frederick to withdraw from Southern Sweden. However, a second Swedish offensive failed, and by 1659 the war had become one of attrition, with neither side able to gain a decisive advantage.

After Charles died in February 1660, his son made peace with his opponents. Sweden kept most of its gains from Denmark, but the belligerents largely returned to the status quo ante bellum.

== Background ==
The 1648 Peace of Westphalia that ended the Thirty Years' War confirmed Sweden as a major European power, and the replacement of its rival Denmark-Norway in the Baltic Sea. While Sweden and Russia had been at peace since the Treaty of Stolbovo in 1617, the former remained at war with the Polish–Lithuanian Commonwealth, although a truce between the two sides had been continually renewed since 1630.

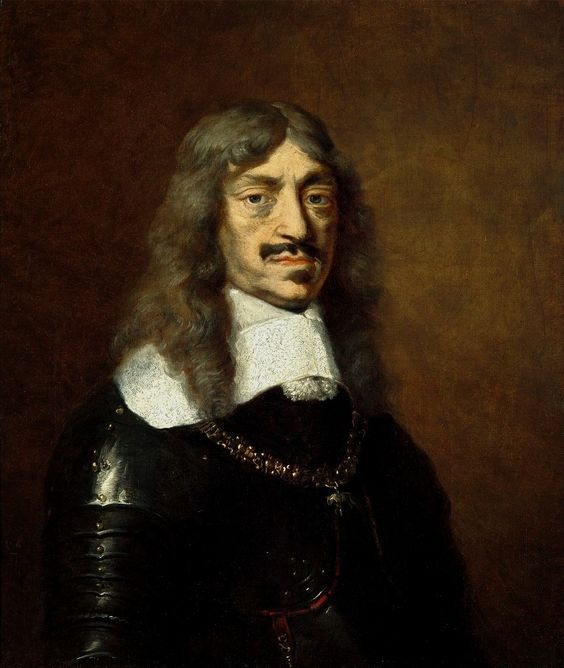
John II Casimir Vasa

The Commonwealth had been increasingly weakened by internal rebellions, such as the Khmelnytsky Uprising, while conflict between King John II Casimir Vasa and the Sejm paralysed the administration. The Russo-Polish War (1654–67) began when Russian troops invaded Poland, supported by Cossack rebels. Meeting little opposition, these soon neared the Baltic coast, potentially threatening Swedish interests in the region.

This drove Charles X Gustav of Sweden to intervene, claiming to be protecting fellow Protestants in Poland. He sought support from the Cossack Hetmanate, promising military support if they abandoned the Russians. Although Sweden was anxious to avoid direct conflict with Russia, negotiations with Poland broke down when John II Casimir refused to drop claims to the Swedish crown. Combined with the unwillingness of the Polish–Lithuanian nobility to make concessions, talks in Lübeck ended in February 1655 without a result. Sweden now decided to launch a preemptive attack on the Commonwealth, seeking to occupy its yet available territories before the Russians.

== Swedish campaigns in the Polish–Lithuanian Commonwealth ==
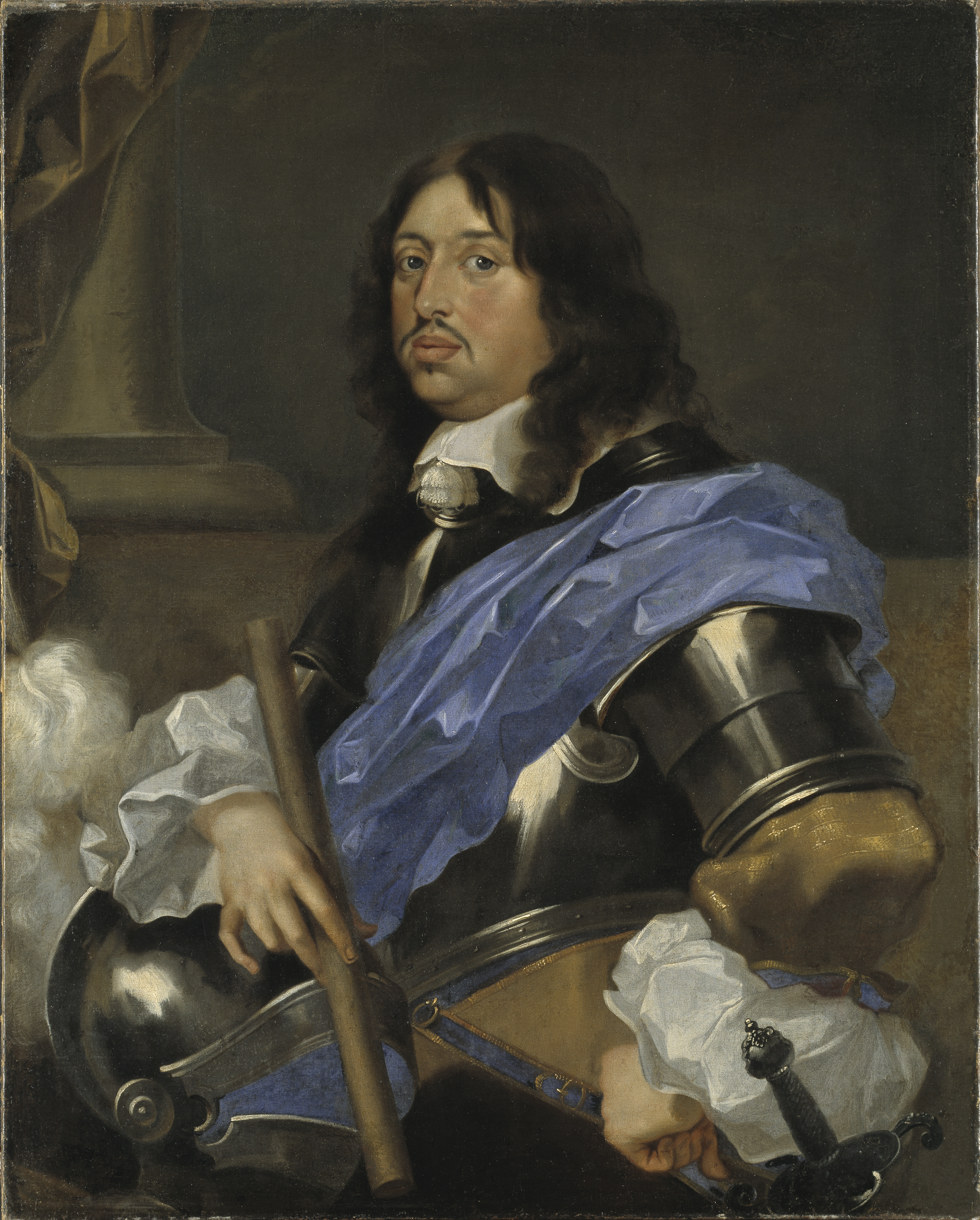
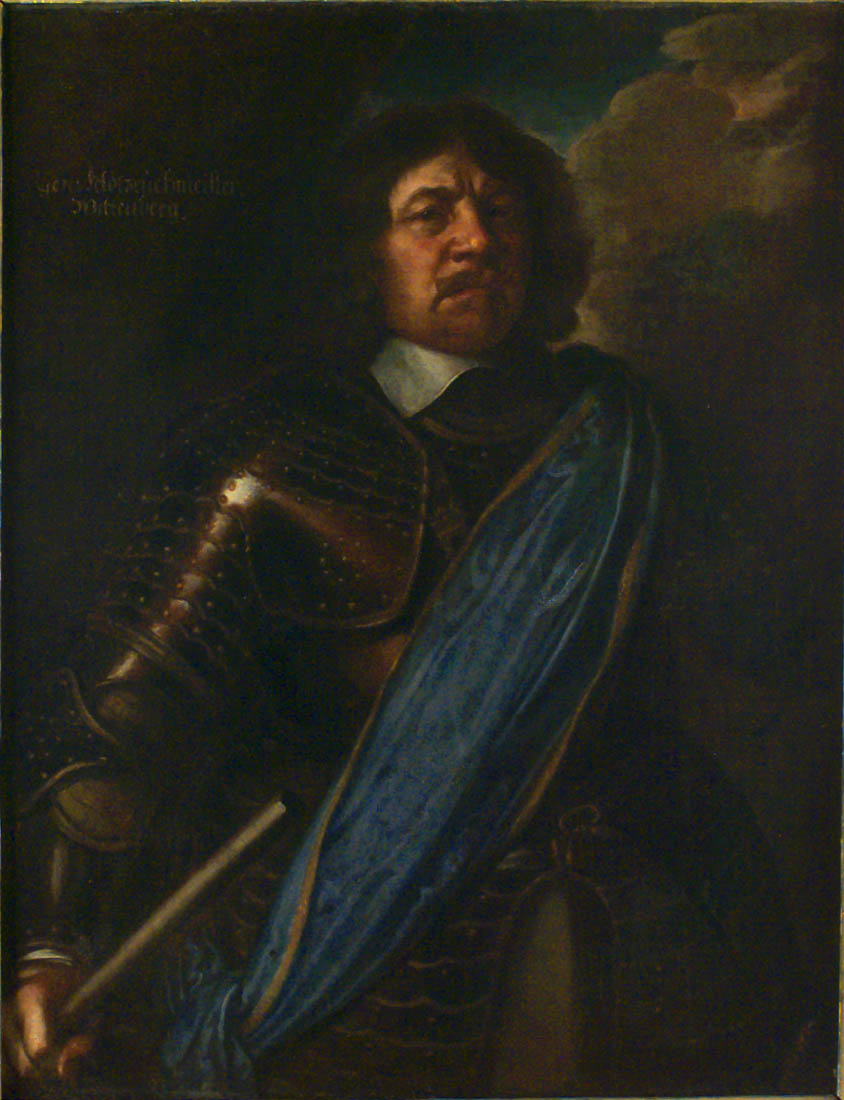
Charles X Gustav (left) and Arvid Wittenberg (right)

Swedish forces entered Poland–Lithuania from Swedish Pomerania in the west, and Livonia in the north. The division on the western flank consisted of 13,650 men and 72 artillery pieces commanded by Arvid Wittenberg who entered Poland on 21 July 1655 and another 12,700 to 15,000 commanded by Charles X Gustav who followed in August, while the division on the northern flank consisted of 7,200 men commanded by Magnus De la Gardie who had already seized Dünaburg with them on 12 July.

On the western front, Wittenberg was opposed by a Polish levy of 13,000 and an additional 1,400 peasant infantry. Aware of the military superiority of the well-trained Swedish army, the nobles of Greater Poland surrendered to Wittenberg on 25 July in Ujście after the Battle of Ujście, and then pledged loyalty to the Swedish king. Wittenberg established a garrison in Poznań (Posen).

On the northern front, Prince Janusz Radziwiłł signed the Treaty of Kėdainiai with Sweden on 17 August 1655, placing the Grand Duchy of Lithuania under Swedish protection. Though Radziwiłł had been negotiating with Sweden before, during his dispute with the Polish king, Kėdainiai provided a clause stipulating that the two parts of the Commonwealth, Poland and Lithuania, need not fight each other. Part of the Grand Ducal Lithuanian Army opposed the treaty however, forming a confederation led by the magnate and Polish–Lithuanian hetman Paweł Jan Sapieha at Virbalis.

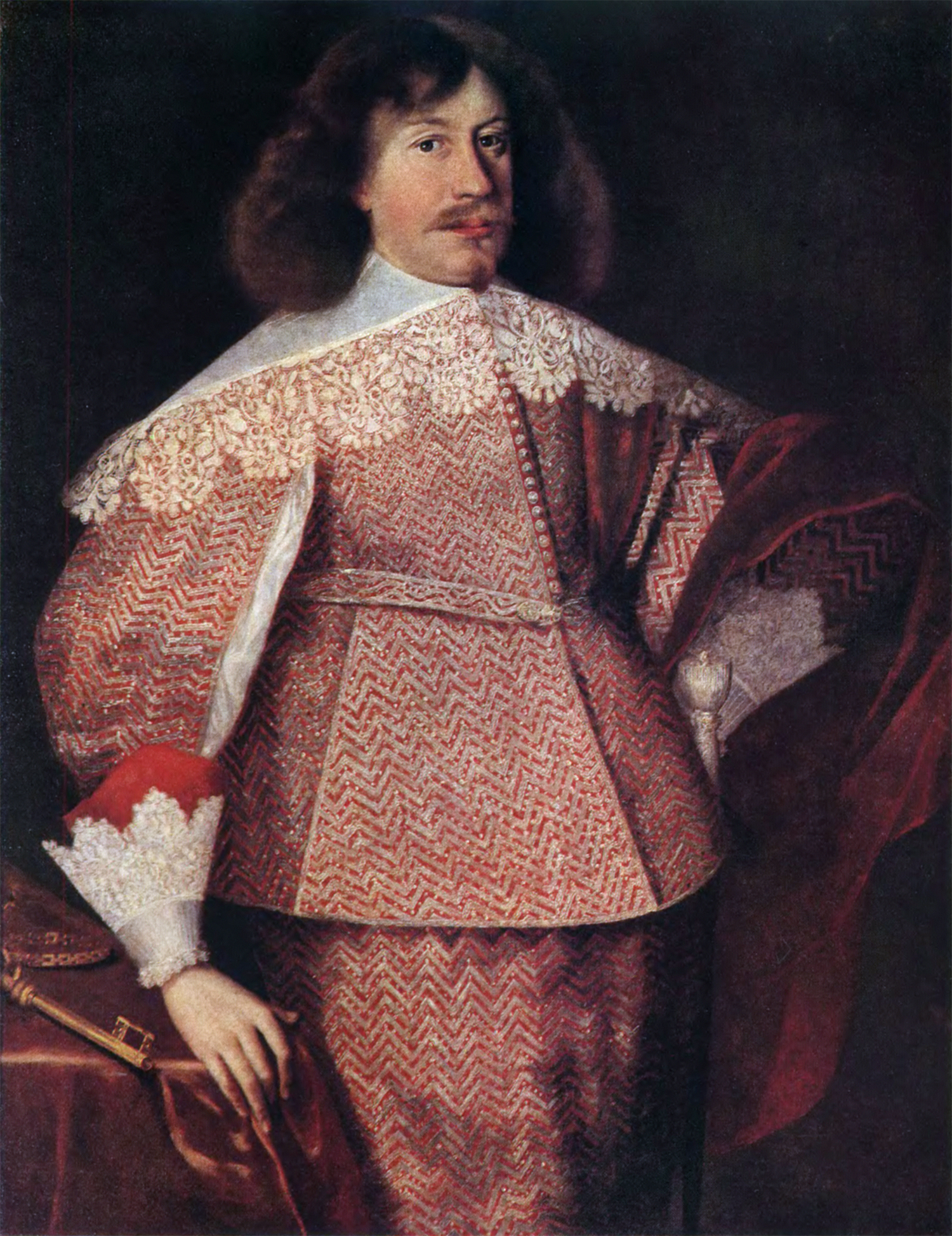
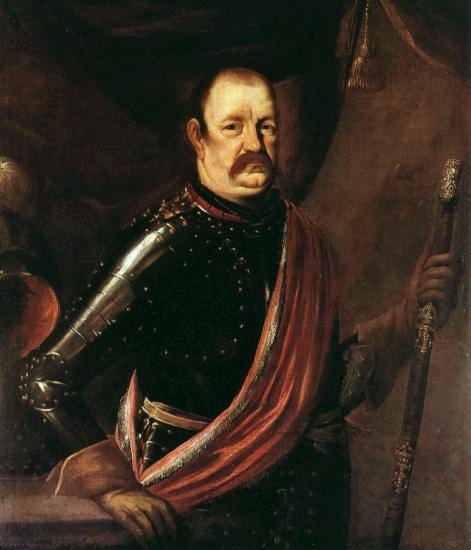
Prince Radziwiłł (left) and Hetman Lubomirski (right)

On 24 August, Charles X Gustav joined Wittenberg's forces. The Polish king John II Casimir left Warsaw the same month to confront the Swedish army in the west, but after some skirmishes with the Swedish vanguard retreated southwards to Kraków. On 8 September Charles X Gustav occupied Warsaw, then turned south to confront the retreating Polish king. The kings met at the Battle of Żarnów on 16 September, which like the next encounter at the Battle of Wojnicz on 3 October was a victory for Sweden. John II Casimir was exiled to Silesia while Kraków surrendered to Charles X Gustav on 19 October.

On 20 October, a second treaty was ratified at Kėdainiai in the north. The Union of Kėdainiai unified Lithuania with Sweden, with Radziwiłł recognizing Charles X Gustav as Grand Duke of Lithuania. Over the following days, most of the Polish army surrendered to Sweden: on 26 October Koniecpolski surrendered with 5,385 men near Kraków, on 28 October Field Crown Hetman Stanisław Lanckoroński and Great Crown Hetman Stanisław "Rewera" Potocki surrendered with 10,000 men, and on 31 October the levy of Mazovia surrendered after the Battle of Nowy Dwór.

== Occupation of Poland–Lithuania and the Brandenburgian intervention ==
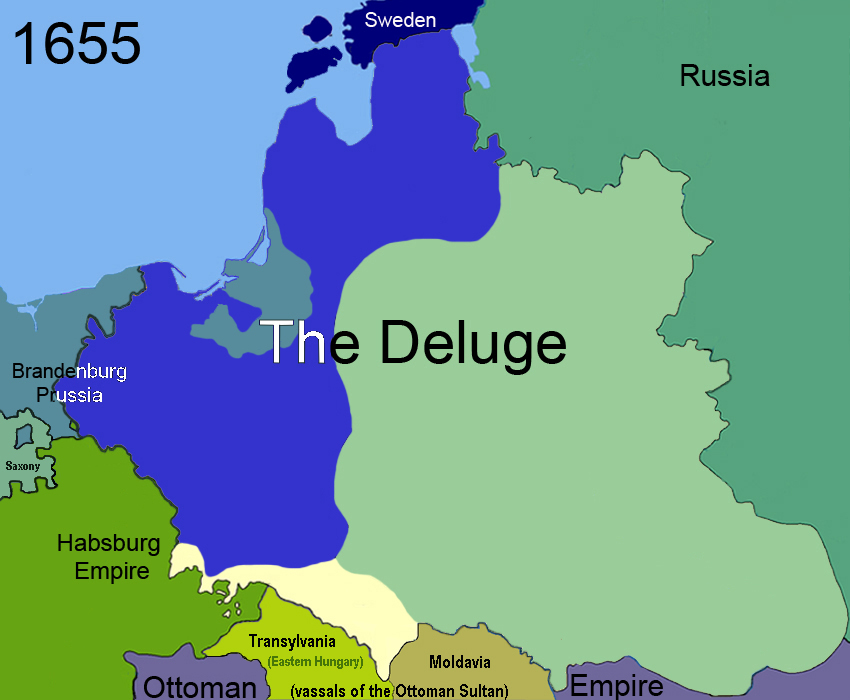
Approximate extent of Swedish-occupied (light blue) and Russian-occupied (light green) Poland–Lithuania

Meanwhile, Russian and Cossack forces had occupied the east of the Polish–Lithuanian Commonwealth as far as Lublin, with only Lwow (Lviv, Lemberg) remaining under Polish–Lithuanian control. In late October, Charles X Gustav headed northwards and left Wittenberg in Kraków with a mobile force of 3,000 Swedish and 2,000 Polish troops, and an additional number scattered in garrisons, to control the southern part of the Swedish-occupied commonwealth.

In the north, the Royal Prussian nobles concluded a defensive alliance with the Electorate of Brandenburg on 12 November in the Treaty of Rinsk, permitting Brandenburgian garrisons. Danzig (Gdansk), Thorn (Torun) and Elbing (Elblag) had not participated in the treaty, with Thorn and Elbing surrendering to Sweden. In the Treaty of Königsberg on 17 January 1656, Frederick William, Elector of Brandenburg and Duke of Prussia, took the Duchy of Prussia, formerly a Polish fief, as a fief from Charles X Gustav. The Brandenburgian garrisons in Royal Prussia were withdrawn, and when Marienburg (Malbork) surrendered in March, Danzig remained the only town not under Swedish control.

The rapid Swedish invasion and occupation of the Polish–Lithuanian territories became known in Poland as the "(Swedish) deluge."

== Polish–Lithuanian recovery ==
The "deluge" and religious differences between the primarily Protestant Swedes and the primarily Catholic Poles, resulting in cases of maltreatment and murder of Catholic clergy and monks as well as cases of looting of Catholic churches and monasteries, gave rise to some partisan movements in the Swedish-occupied territory. A guerilla force attacked a small Swedish garrison at Koscian in October 1655 and killed Frederick of Hesse, brother-in-law of the Swedish king. The Pauline monastery Jasna Góra in Częstochowa successfully resisted a Swedish siege throughout November 1655 to January 1656. On 20 November a manifesto was issued in Opole (Oppeln) calling for public resistance and the return of John II Casimir, and in December a peasant force took Nowy Sącz. On 29 December, the partisan Tyszowce Confederation was constituted under participation of Lanckoroński and Potocki, and on 1 January 1656 John II Casimir returned from exile. Later in January, Stefan Czarniecki joined in, and by February most Polish soldiers who were in Swedish service since October 1655, had switched sides to that of the confederation.

Charles X Gustav, with a force of 11,000 horse, reacted by pursuing Czarniecki's force of 2,400 men, confronting and defeating him in the Battle of Gołąb in February 1656. Charles X Gustav then intended to take Lwow, but his advance was halted in the Battle of Zamość, when he was nearly encircled by the growing Polish–Lithuanian armies under Sapieha and Czarniecki, and barely escaped on 5 and 6 April breaking through Sapieha's lines during the Battle of Sandomierz at the cost of his artillery and baggage. A Swedish relief force under Frederick of Baden-Durlach was destroyed by Czarniecki on 7 April in the Battle of Warka. In the same month, John II Casimir with the Lwów Oath proclaimed Virgin Mary queen of Poland, and promised to lift the burdens inflicted on the peasantry if he regained control.

== Brandenburgian-Swedish alliance and Russia's war on Sweden ==
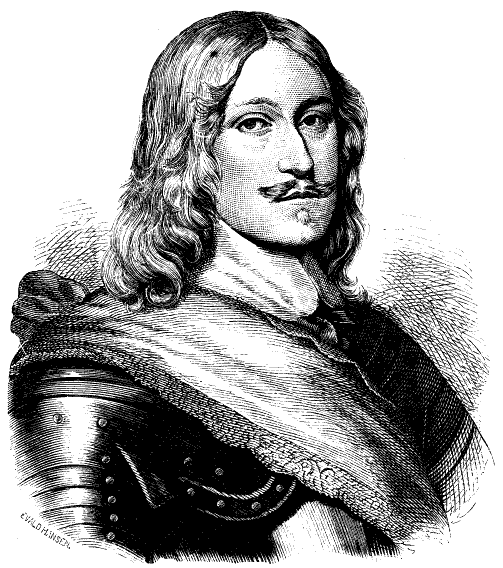
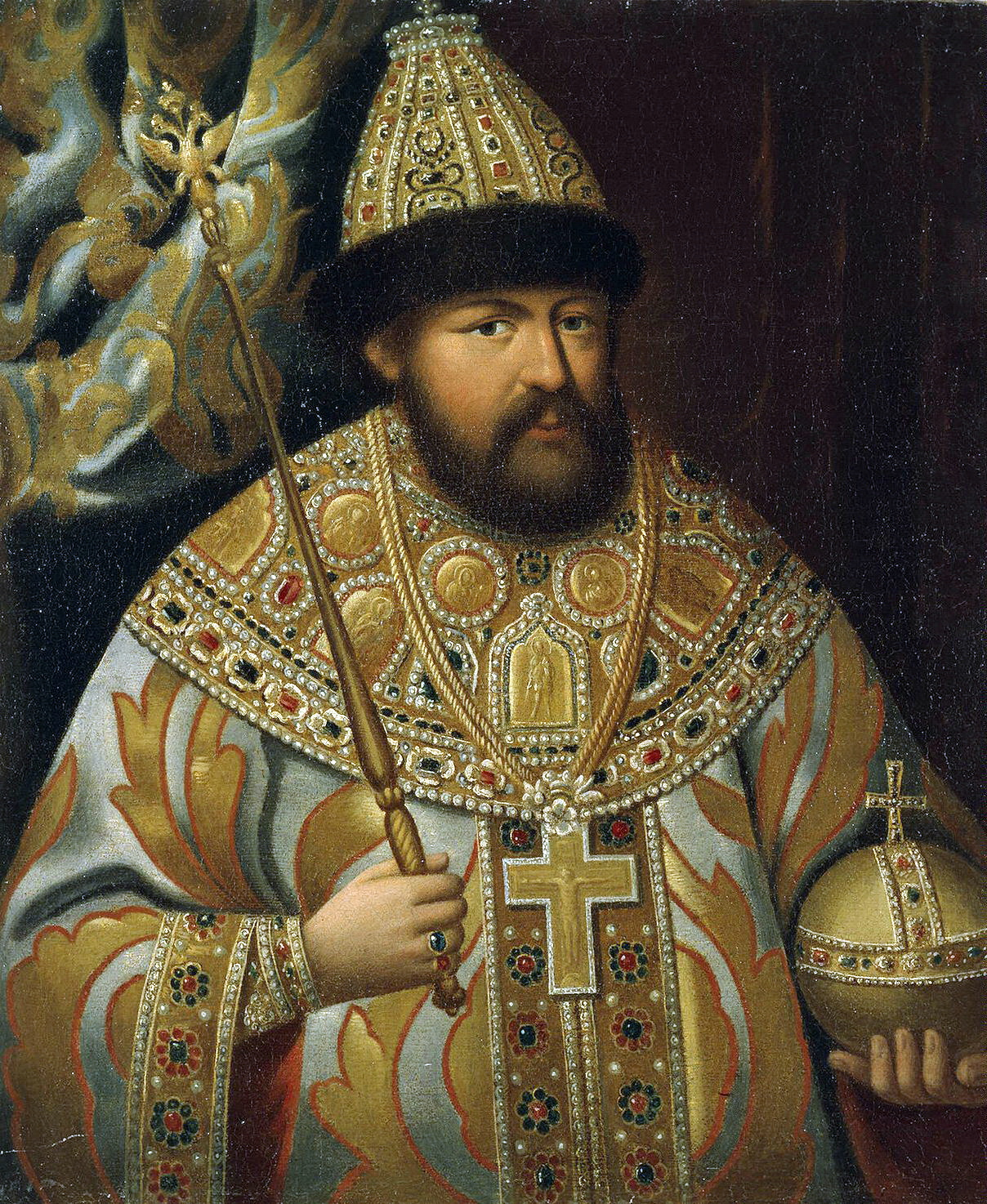
Magnus de la Gardie (left) and Alexis of Russia (right)

On 25 June 1656, Charles X Gustav signed an alliance with Brandenburg: the Treaty of Marienburg granted Greater Poland to Frederick William in return for military aid. While the Brandenburgian elector was free of Swedish vassalage in Greater Poland, he remained a Swedish vassal for the Duchy of Prussia. Brandenburgian garrisons then replaced the Swedish ones in Greater Poland, who went to reinforce Charles X Gustav's army. On 29 June however, Warsaw was stormed by John II Casimir, who had drawn up to Charles X Gustav with a force of 28,500 regulars and a noble levy of 18,000 to 20,000. Thereupon, Brandenburg actively participated in the war on the Swedish side, prompting John II Casimir Vasa to state that while his Tartars already had the Swedes for breakfast, he would now take Frederick William into custody, where neither sun nor moon would shine.

Already in May 1656, Alexis of Russia had declared war on Sweden, taking advantage of Charles being tied up in Poland, and Livonia, Estonia and Ingria secured only by a Livonian army of 2,200 infantry and 400 dragoons, Magnus de la Gardie's 7,000 men in Prussia, and 6,933 men dispersed in garrisons along the Eastern Baltic coast. Alexis invaded Livonia in July with 35,000 men and took Dünaburg.

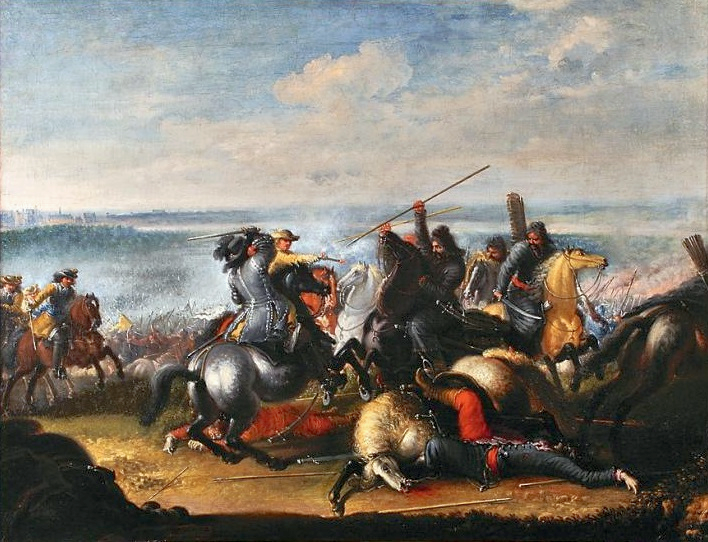
Swedish King Charles X Gustav in skirmish with Polish Tatars during the Battle of Warsaw

In late July, Danzig was reinforced by a Dutch garrison, and a combined Danish and Dutch fleet broke the naval blockage imposed on Danzig by Charles X Gustav. On 28–30 July, a combined Brandenburgian-Swedish army was able to defeat the Polish–Lithuanian army in the Battle of Warsaw, forcing John II Casimir to retreat to Lublin. In August, Alexis' army took Livonian Kokenhausen (Koknese), laid siege to Riga and Dorpat (Tartu) and raided Estonia, Ingria and Kexholm.

On 4 October, John II Casimir stormed Łęczyca in Greater Poland before heading for Royal Prussia, and on 8 October, Wincenty Korwin Gosiewski with 12,000 to 13,000 Lithuanian and Crimean Tartar cavalry overran a Brandenburgian-Swedish force in the Battle of Prostken in Ducal Prussia. Gosiewski then ravaged Ducal Prussia, burning 13 towns and 250 villages, in a campaign that entered folklore because of the high death toll and the high number of captives deported to the Crimea.

On 22 October, Gosiewski was defeated by Swedish forces in the Battle of Filipów and turned to Lithuania. Also on 22 October, besieged Dorpat surrendered to Alexis, while the Russian siege of Swedish-held Riga was lifted. John II Casimir meanwhile took Bromberg (Bydgoszcz) and Konitz in Royal Prussia, and from 15 November 1656 until February 1657 stayed in Danzig, where a Swedish siege had to be lifted due to Dutch intervention, just 55 kilometers away from Charles X Gustav's quarters in Elbing.

== Swedish–Brandenburgian–Transylvanian–Romanian alliance and the truces with Russia ==
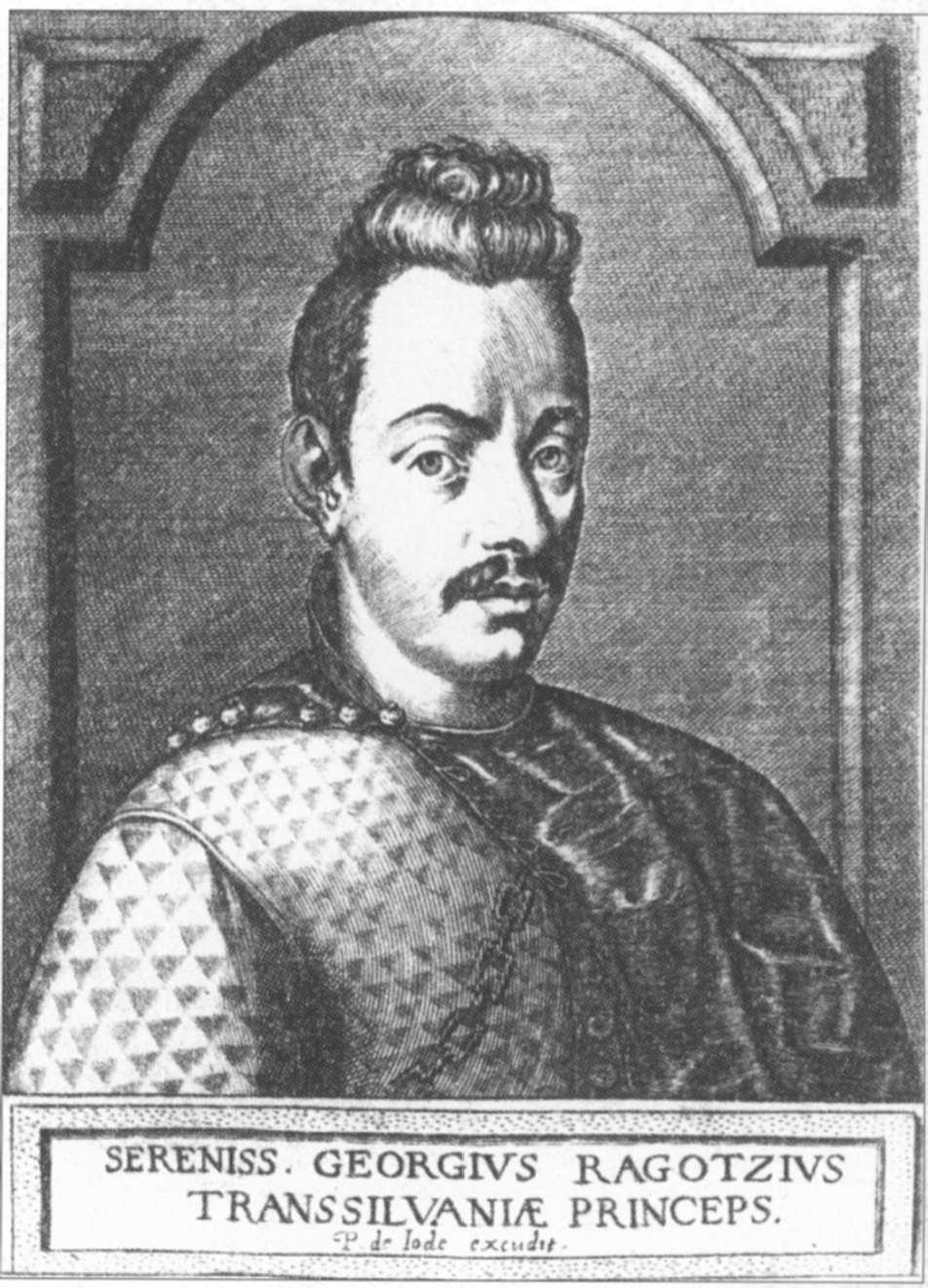
George II Rákóczi

In the Treaty of Labiau on 20 November, Charles X Gustav of Sweden granted Frederick William of Brandenburg full sovereignty in the Duchy of Prussia in return for a more active participation in the war. In the Treaty of Radnot on 6 December, Charles X Gustav promised to accept George II Rákóczi of Transylvania as king of Poland and Grand Duke of Lithuania in return for his entrance into the war. Rákóczi entered the war in January 1657, crossing into the commonwealth with a force of 25,000 Transylvanian-Wallachian-Moldavian men and 20,000 Cossacks who reinforced Kraków before they met with Charles X Gustav, who had led a Swedish-Brandenburgian army southwards. The following month saw the Swedish-Brandenburg-Transylvanian-Romanian-Cossack forces play cat and mouse with the Polish–Lithuanian forces, moving about all of the commonwealth without any major engagements, except the capture of Brest by Charles X Gustav in May, and the capture of Warsaw by Rákóczi and Gustaf Otto Stenbock on 17 June.

Due to internal conflicts within the Cossacks there was practically no participation of the Cossack Hetmanate in that war. Worn out from previous campaigns and requesting Bohdan Khmelnytsky to break with Sweden, Alexis of Russia eventually signed the Truce of Vilna or Niemież with the Polish–Lithuanian Commonwealth, and did not engage the Swedish army in any major battle throughout 1657 even though he still reinforced his armies in Livonia. On 18 June, a Swedish force defeated a Russian army of 8,000 men commanded by Matvey V. Sheremetev in the Battle of Walk, however, a month later it was defeated by the Russians near Gdov, after that the actions were in the nature of mutual raids. In early 1658, Sweden and Russia agreed on a truce, resulting in the Treaty of Valiesar (Vallisaare, 1658) and the Treaty of Kardis (Kärde, 1661). The Russian war with Poland–Lithuania on the other hand resumed in 1658.

== Austro–Brandenburgian–Polish alliance, Danish campaigns in Sweden ==
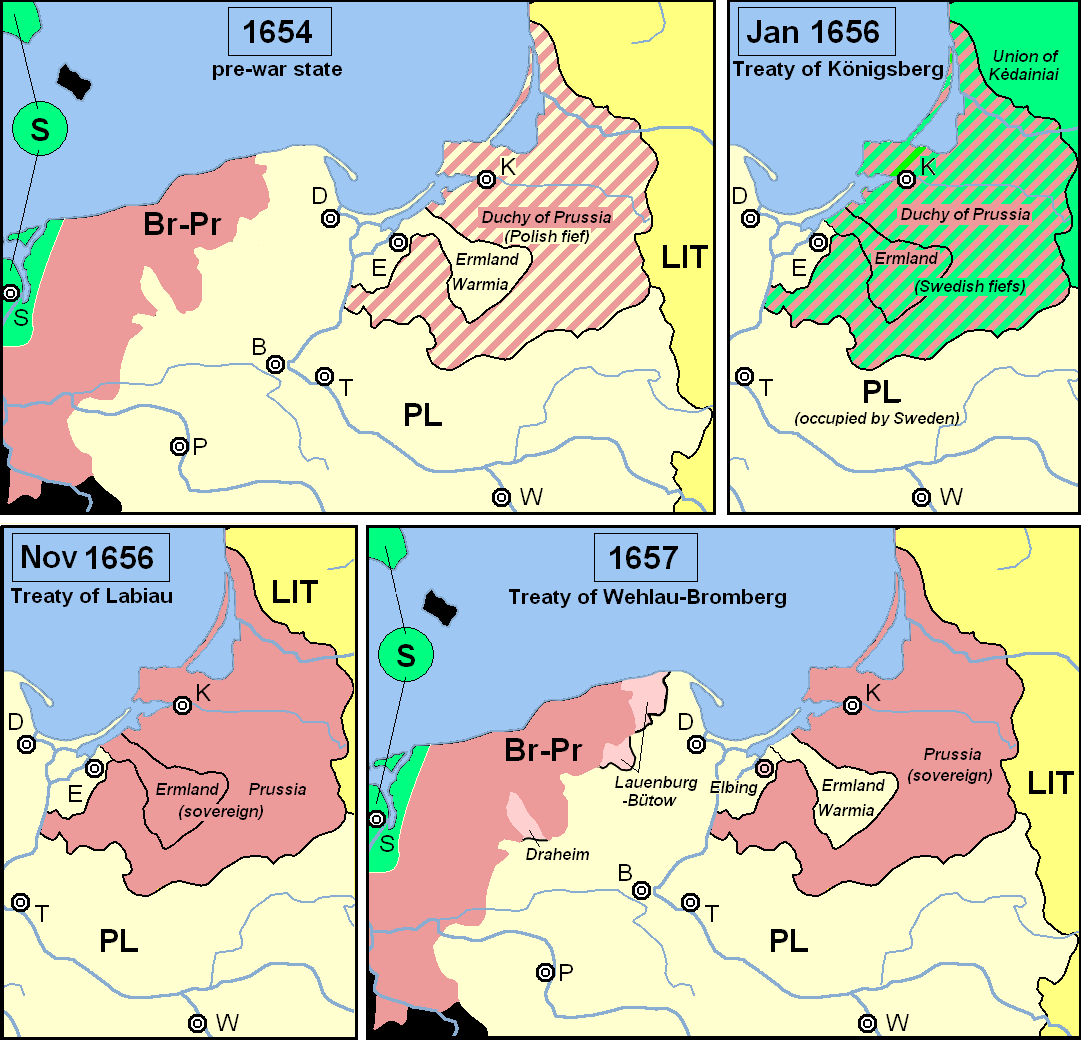
Territorial changes following the Treaty of Wehlau-Bromberg, compared to the pre-war situation (1654) and the treaties of Königsberg (January 1656) and Labiau (November 1656).

Like Sweden, John II Casimir also sought allies to break the deadlock of the war. On 1 December 1656, he signed an alliance with Ferdinand III of Habsburg in Vienna, essentially a declaration of Ferdinand III's intend to mediate a peace rather than provide military aid, which did not come into effect until Ferdinand's death on 2 April 1657. The treaty was however renewed and amended on 27 May by Ferdinand's successor Leopold I of Habsburg, who agreed in Vienna to provide John II Casimir with 12,000 troops maintained at Polish expense; in return, Leopold received Kraków and Posen in pawn. Receiving the news, Frederick III of Denmark promptly declared war on Sweden, and by June the Austrian army entered the Polish–Lithuanian Commonwealth from the south, immediately stabilizing the situation in southern Poland by conquering Kraków, while Denmark attacked Swedish Bremen-Verden and turned to Jämtland and Västergötland in July.

When Charles X Gustav left the Commonwealth and headed westwards for an anti-Danish counterstrike, the Swedish–Brandenburgian–Transylvanian alliance broke apart. Rákóczi of Transylvania was unable to withstand the combined Austrian and Polish–Lithuanian forces without Swedish support, and after a pursuit into Ukraine, he was encircled and forced to capitulate, with the rest of the Transylvanian army defeated by the Tartars.

Brandenburg changed sides in return for Polish withdrawal of claims to Ducal Prussia, declaring Frederick William the sole sovereign in the Duchy with the treaties of Wehlau on 19 September and Bromberg on 6 November. In addition, the aforementioned treaties secured Brandenburg the Lands of Lauenburg and Bütow at the border of Brandenburgian Pomerania, while the Bishopric of Ermeland was returned to Poland.

== Denmark–Norway and Pomerania ==
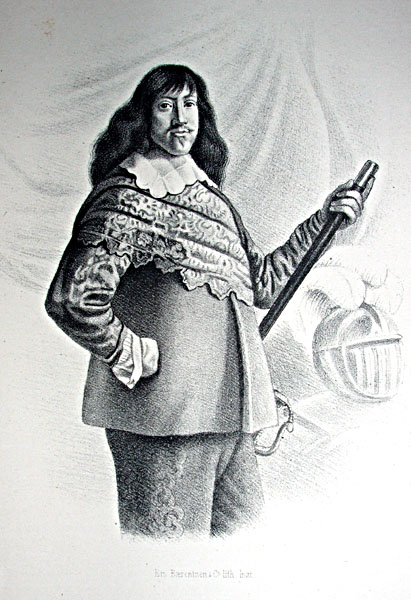
Frederick III of Denmark

The attack of Frederick III of Denmark in June 1657, aimed at regaining the territories lost in 1645, provided an opportunity for Charles X Gustav to abandon the unfortunate Polish–Lithuanian battlefields. With 9,950 horse and 2,800 foot, he marched through Pomerania and Mecklenburg. In Holstein, the Swedish force was split with Carl Gustaf Wrangel heading west to clear Bremen-Verden and Charles X Gustav heading north to clear Jutland. When these aims were achieved, Charles X Gustav in September moved to the Swedish port of Wismar and ordered his navy into the inconclusive Battle of Møn.

Meanwhile, Polish forces led by general Stefan Czarniecki ravaged southern Swedish Pomerania, and destroyed and plundered Pasewalk, Gartz (Oder) and Penkun. The Habsburg and Brandenburg allies however were reluctant to join Czarniecki, and against John II Casimir's wish decided against taking the war to the Holy Roman Empire fearing the start of a new Thirty Years' War.

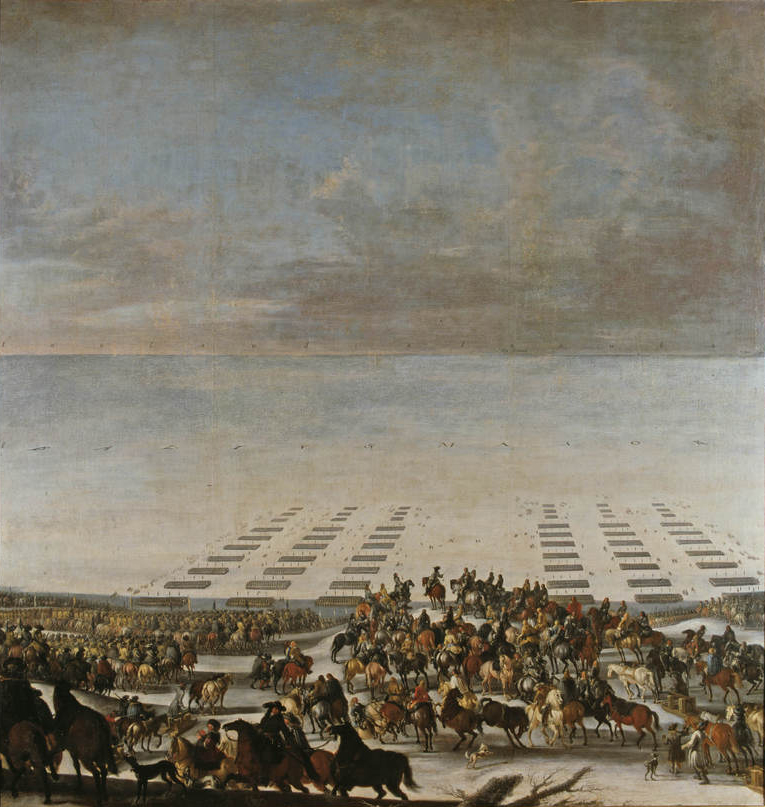
The March across the Great Belt by Johann Philip Lemke.

The harsh winter of 1657/58 had forced the Dano-Norwegian fleet to stay in port, and the Great and Little Belts separating the Danish isles from the mainland were frozen. After entering Jutland from the south, a Swedish army of 7,000 veterans undertook the March across the Belts; on 9 February 1658, the Little Belt was crossed and the island Funen (Fyn) captured within a few days, and soon thereafter Langeland, Lolland and Falster. On 25 February, the Swedish army continued across the Great Belt to Zealand where the Danish capital Copenhagen is located. Although only 5,000 men made it across the belts, the Swedish attack was completely unexpected; Frederick III was compelled to surrender and signed the disadvantageous Treaty of Roskilde on 26 February 1658.

Sweden had won its most prestigious victory, and Denmark had suffered its most costly defeat. Denmark was forced to yield the provinces of Scania, Halland, Blekinge and the island of Bornholm. Halland had already been under Swedish control since the signing of the Treaty of Brömsebro in 1645, but they now became Swedish territory indefinitely. Denmark also had to surrender the Norwegian province Trøndelag to Sweden.

Yet, Swedish-held territory in Poland had been reduced to some towns in Royal Prussia, most notably Elbing, Marienburg and Thorn. With Transylvania neutralized and Brandenburg defected, Charles X Gustav's position in the region was not strong enough to force his stated aim, the permanent gain of Royal Prussia. He was further pressed militarily when an Austro-Polish army laid siege to Thorn in July 1658, and diplomatically when he was urged by France to settle. France was unwilling to intervene militarily, and Sweden could not afford to violate the Peace of Westphalia by attacking the Habsburg and Brandenburgian possessions in the Holy Roman Empire, which would likely have driven several Germans into the anti-Swedish alliance. Thus, Charles X Gustav opted to instead attack Denmark again.

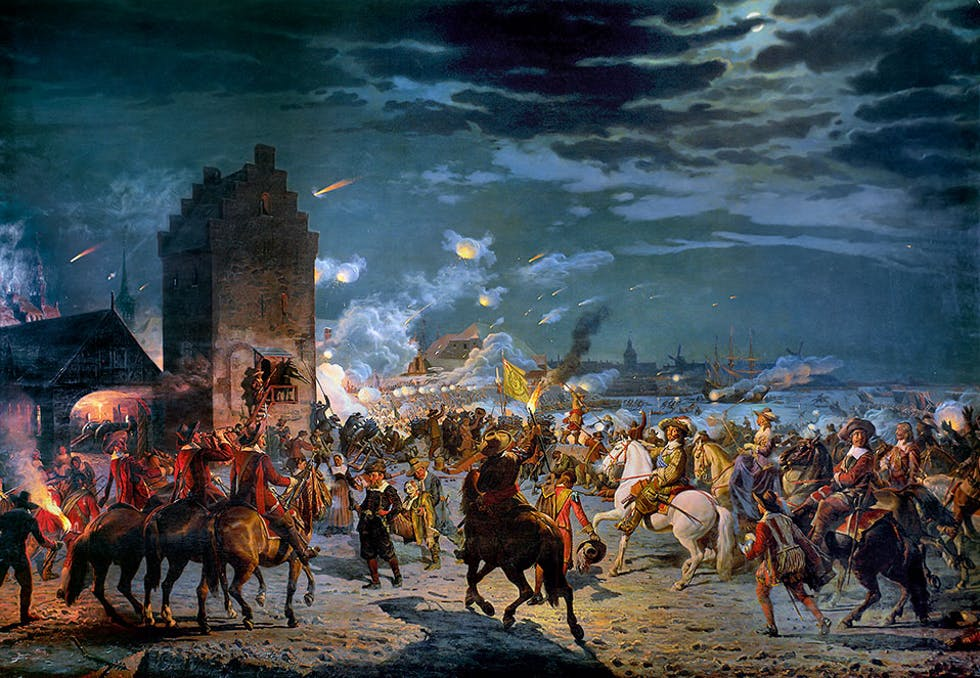
The Assault on Copenhagen (1887) by Frederik Christian Lund.

When the Danes stalled and prolonged the fulfillment of some provisions of the Treaty of Roskilde by postponing payments and not blocking foreign fleets from access to the Baltic Sea, and with half of the 2,000 Danish soldiers that were obliged by Roskilde to enter Swedish service deserting, the Swedish king embarked from Kiel with a force of 10,000 men on 16 August. While everyone expected him to head for Royal Prussia, he disembarked on Zealand on 17 August, and headed for Copenhagen, which was defended by 10,650 Danes and 2,000 Dutch. This time however, the town did not surrender, and a long siege ensued. When Swedish forces took Kronborg in September, they controlled both sides of the Øresund, yet in November a Dutch fleet broke the Swedish naval blockade of Copenhagen in the Battle of the Sound.

Meanwhile, the anti-Swedish alliance had deployed an army to Denmark, to confront Charles X Gustav with a force of 14,500 Brandenburgers commanded by Frederick William, 10,600 Austrians commanded by Raimondo Montecuccoli, and 4,500 Poles commanded by Czarniecki. By January 1659, the allied forces stood at Fredriksodde, Kolding and Als. Charles X Gustav then tried a decisive assault on Copenhagen on 21 and 22 February, but was repelled.

== Sweden entrenched ==
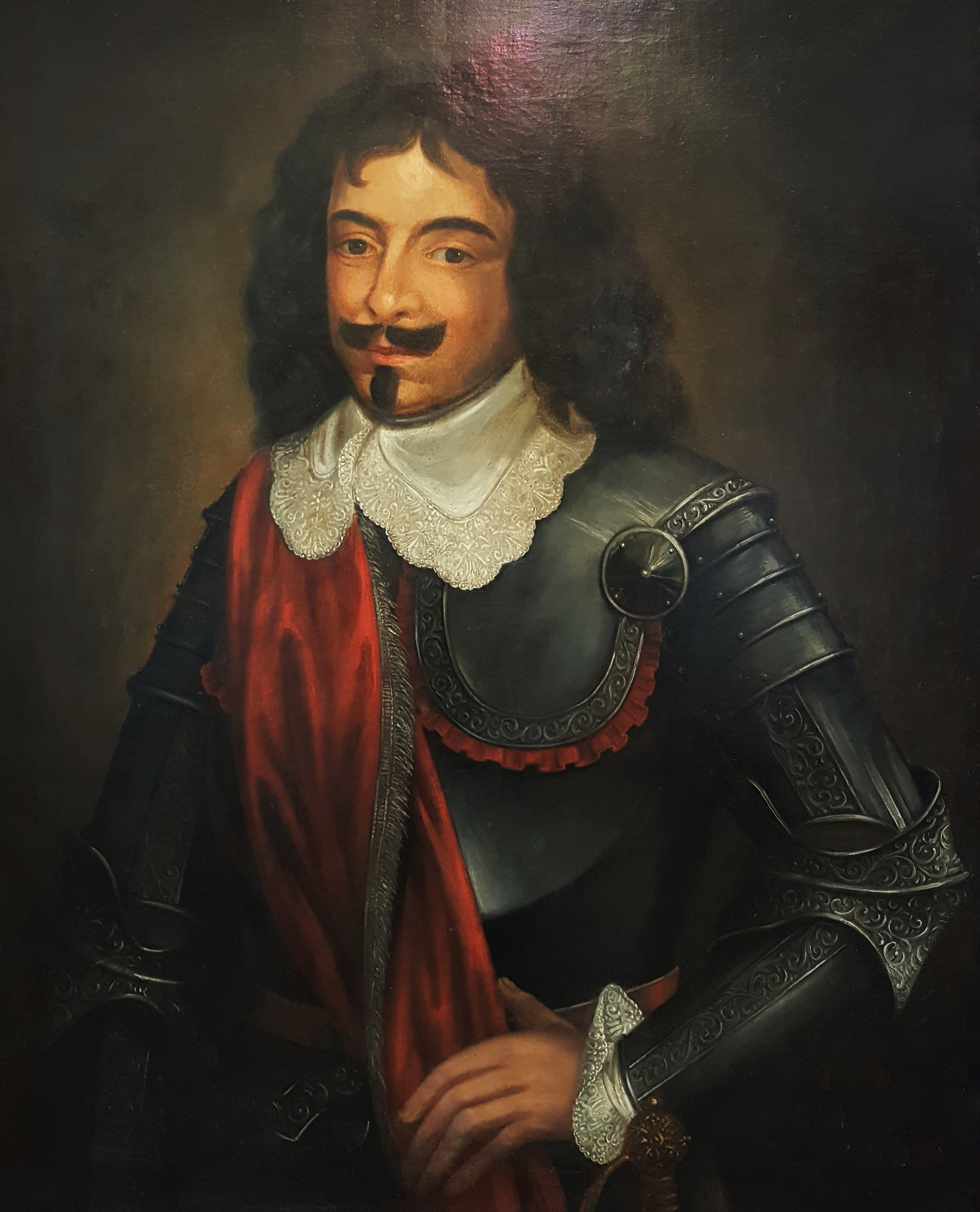
Jean-Louis Raduit de Souches

In 1659, the war was characterized by Swedish forces defending their strongholds on the southern Baltic coast against allied assaults. A combined force of 17,000 Austrians and 13,000 Brandenburgers led by general Jean-Louis Raduit de Souches invaded Swedish Pomerania, took and burned Greifenhagen, took Wolin island and Damm, besieged Stettin and assaulted Greifswald without success, but took Demmin on 9 November. Counterattacks were mounted by general Müller von der Lühnen, who lifted the siege laid on Greifswald by the Brandenburgian prince-elector, and major general Paul Wirtz, who from besieged Stettin managed to capture the Brandenburgian ammunition depot at Curau and took it to Stralsund. The Brandenburgians withdrew ravaging the countryside while retreating.

In the occupied and annexed Danish provinces, guerilla movements pressed Swedish garrisons. After an uprising, Norwegians took Trondheim in late 1658. In Scania and Zealand, the "snaphaner" led by Lorenz Tuxen and Svend Poulsen ("Gøngehøvdingen") ambushed Swedish forces. The Swedish garrison of Bornholm was forced to surrender to Danish insurgents, with the commander killed.

In Royal Prussia (Eastern Pomerania in contemporary Poland), Thorn had fallen already in December 1658, but Elbing and Marienwerder withstood. On 24 November, Sweden had to abandon Funen and Langeland after the defeat in the Battle of Nyborg. In January 1660, Sweden lost the Livonian fortress Mitau.

Meanwhile, conflicts arose within the anti-Swedish alliance between the Habsburgs and Poland–Lithuania when the Habsburgs demanded ever more contributions while not showing the war efforts Poland–Lithuania had expected. With the Russo-Polish War ongoing, most Polish–Lithuanian forces were tied up in Ukraine. England, France and the Dutch Republic had agreed on a petition in the First Concert of the Hague, urging Sweden to settle for peace with Denmark on the terms of Roskilde, and peace talks mediated by France were taking place throughout 1659.

== Peace ==
Territorial gains of the Swedish Empire after the Treaty of Roskilde and Treaty of Copenhagen (1660). The Second Northern War marked the height of Sweden's stormaktstiden.

Charles X Gustav fell ill in early 1660 and died on 23 February of that year. With his death, one of the major obstacles to peace was gone and the Treaty of Oliva was signed on 23 April. Sweden was accepted as sovereign in Swedish Livonia, Brandenburg was accepted as sovereign in Ducal Prussia, and John II Casimir withdrew his claims to the Swedish throne, though he was to retain the title for life. All occupied territories were restored to their pre-war sovereigns.

Historians are split on which side emerged victorious. Some assess the war as a Swedish victory, while others assess the war as a Swedish defeat. Additionally, other historians either assess the war as favourable to Sweden, or favorable to the Commonwealth.

However, Denmark was not keen on peace after its recent successes and witnessing the weakness of the Swedish efforts. The Dutch Republic withdrew its blockade but was soon convinced by Denmark to support them again. France and England intervened for Sweden and the situation again teetered on the edge of a major conflict. However, the Danish statesman Hannibal Sehested negotiated a peace treaty without any direct involvement by foreign powers. The conflict was resolved with the Treaty of Copenhagen (1660). Sweden returned Bornholm and Trøndelag to Denmark. The treaty of 1660 established political borders between Denmark, Sweden and Norway which have lasted to the present day, and secured the Swedish dominium maris baltici.

Russia, still engaged in the Russo-Polish War (1654–1667), settled its dispute with Sweden in the Treaty of Cardis, which restored Russian-occupied Swedish territory to Sweden.

=== List of peace treaties ===
- Treaty of Königsberg: Sweden and Brandenburg–Prussia (1656, superseded by Bromberg and Oliva)
- Treaty of Bromberg: Brandenburg–Prussia and Poland–Lithuania
- Treaty of Roskilde: Sweden and Denmark-Norway (1658, superseded by Copenhagen)
- Treaty of Oliva: Sweden and Brandenburg–Prussia, Austria and Poland–Lithuania (1660)
- Treaty of Copenhagen: Sweden and Denmark–Norway (1660)
- Treaty of Cardis: Sweden and Russia (1661)

== See also ==
- Great Northern War
- List of Prussian wars
- List of Swedish wars
- Polish–Swedish wars
- Second Northern War and Norway
- Deluge (history)

== Bibliography ==
- Anisimov, Evgeniĭ Viktorovich (1993). The Reforms of Peter the Great: Progress Through Coercion in Russia. The New Russian history. Translated by John Alexander. New York: Sharpe. ISBN 1-56324-048-3.
- Buchholz, Werner, ed. (1999). Pommern (in German). Siedler. ISBN 3-88680-780-0.
- Frost, Robert I. (2000). The Northern Wars: War, State and Society in Northeastern Europe 1558–1721. Longman. ISBN 978-0-582-06429-4.
- Frost, Robert I. (2004). After the Deluge: Poland–Lithuania and the Second Northern War, 1655–1660. Cambridge Studies in Early Modern History. Cambridge University Press. ISBN 0-521-54402-5.
- Hrushevskyi, Mykhailo (2003). "Between Moscow and Sweden". Illustrated History of Ukraine (in Russian). Donetsk: BAO. ISBN 966-548-571-7.
- Kotljarchuk, Andrej (2006). In the Shadows of Poland and Russia: The Grand Duchy of Lithuania and Sweden in the European Crisis of the mid-17th century. Södertörns högskola. ISBN 91-89315-63-4.
- Kozicki, Richard; Wróbel, Piotr, eds. (1996). Historical Dictionary of Poland, 966–1945. Greenwood Publishing Group. ISBN 0-313-26007-9.
- Lockhart, Paul Douglas (2007). Denmark, 1513–1660: The Rise and Decline of a Renaissance Monarchy. Oxford University Press. ISBN 978-0-19-927121-4.
- Moote, Alanson Lloyd (1970). The Seventeenth Century: Europe in Ferment. Heath.
- Oakley, Steward (1992). War and Peace in the Baltic, 1560–1790. War in Context. Abingdon, New York: Routledge. ISBN 0-415-02472-2.
- Press, Volker (1991). Kriege und Krisen. Deutschland 1600–1715. Neue deutsche Geschichte (in German). Vol. 5. Munich: Beck. ISBN 3-406-30817-1.
- Rieber, Alfred J. (2013). "Repressive Population Transfers in Central, Eastern and South-eastern Europe: A Historical Overview". In Rieber, Alfred J. (ed.). Forced Migration in Central and Eastern Europe, 1939-1950. Routledge. ISBN 9781135274825.
- Durant, Will; Durant, Ariel (2011). The Age of Louis XIV. The Story of Civilization. Vol. 8. Simon & Schuster.
- Kiser, Edgar; Drass, Kriss A.; Brustein, William (1994). "The Relationship Between Revolt and War in Early Modern Western Europe". Journal of Political & Military Sociology. 22 (2). University of Florida Press: 305–324 – via JSTOR.
- Bodart, Gaston (1908). Militär-historisches Kriegs-Lexikon (1618-1905) [Military-Historical War Lexicon (1618-1905)] (in German). C. W. Stern.
- Wang, Kevin; Ray, James Lee (1994). "Beginners and Winners: The Fate of Initiators of Interstate Wars Involving Great Powers Since 1495". International Studies Quarterly. 38 1. Florida State University: 139–154. doi:10.2307/2600875 – via JSTOR.
- Podhorodecki, Leszek (1985). Rapier i koncerz: z dziejów wojen polsko-szwedzkich (in Polish). Książka i Wiedza. ISBN 83-05-11452-X.
- Prazmowska, Anita J. (2017). A History of Poland (2nd ed.). Bloomsbury Publishing. ISBN 9780230344129.
- Sundberg, Ulf (2010). Sveriges krig 1448-1630 [Sweden's wars 1448-1630] (in Swedish). Svenskt militärhistoriskt bibliotek. ISBN 9789185789627.
- Hildebrand, Hans (1918). Världshistoria: Människosläktets Utveckling i Stat Och Samhälle, i Kultur Och Vetenskap: Nya tidens historia (1650–1815) (in Swedish). Aktibolaget fór Spridning af Litterära Verk.
- Edmundson, George (1922). History of Holland. Cambridge University Press.
- Isacson, Clas-Göran (February 3, 2015). Karl X Gustavs krig : fälttågen i Polen, Tyskland, Baltikum, Danmark och Sverige 1655–1660. Historiska Media. p. 267. ISBN 9789175450117.
- Walewski, Antoni (1870). Historya wyzwolonéj Rzeczypospolitéj wpadającej pod jarzmo domowe za panowania Jana Kaźmierza, 1655–1660 (in Polish). Jagiellonian University. p. 79.
- Perrie, Maureen; Lieven, D. C. B.; Suny, Ronald Grigor (2006). The Cambridge History of Russia: Volume 1, From Early Rus' to 1689. Cambridge University Press. ISBN 9780521812276.
- Frost, Robert I. (1993). After the Deluge: Poland–Lithuania and the Second Northern War, 1655–1660. Cambridge University Press. ISBN 9780521420082.
