= Offensive into Swedish Pomerania (1659) =

Invasion of Pomerania during the Second Northern War

- Part of the Dano-Swedish War (1658–1660)
- 1679 map of Swedish Pomerania from the National Archives of Sweden
Date	August–November 1659
Location	Swedish Pomerania
Result	Swedish victory
Territorial changes	Allied withdrawal from Pomerania after the siege of Stettin

Belligerents
(yes) Swedish Empire	Brandenburg; Austria; Polish–Lithuanian Commonwealth

Commanders and leaders
(yes) Carl Gustaf Wrangel (yes) Paul Würtz (yes) Elias Wolfgang Braun †	Jean-Louis Raduit de Souches; Johann Reichard Starhemberg; Frederick William

Units involved
(yes) Stettin garrison (yes) Wildenbruch garrison (yes) Wolin garrison	Three infantry regiments Two cavalry regiments

Strength
Unknown	Total: 30,000 men; 14,000–17,000 men; 13,000 men

The Offensive into Swedish Pomerania, also called the Pomeranian Expedition (Swedish: Expeditionen mot Pommern) and the Emperor's attack on Pomerania (Swedish: Kejsarens anfall på Pommern) was an unsuccessful Austro-Brandenburger invasion of the province during the Second Northern War from August to November 1659.

It began when Jean-Louis de Souches, with 14,000–17,000 men crossed the border, capturing Greifenhagen, and Wildenbruch. Another general, Johann Reichard Starhemberg, captured Kammin before shipping his troops over to Wolin, assaulting the island's main city, also called Wolin. After receiving siege artillery, Souches also took Damm.

A week into the offensive, Frederick William, the elector of Brandenburg, marched towards Pomerania with 13,000 men. Once he crossed the border, he captured Warnemünde, Tribsees, Clempenow, Loitz, and Damgarten, with his attack on Greifswald failing. The allies then moved towards Stettin. The garrison, led by Paul Würtz, held out from September to 5 November, when the allies finally withdrew from the city and raised their siege. They later withdrew completely out of Pomerania, securing Sweden's hold over it.

== Background ==
After his highly successful war with Denmark and the treaty of Roskilde, Charles X Gustav wished to turn his forces towards Brandenburg and Austria. However, the Swedes did not entirely trust the Danes to uphold the treaty, these suspicions being reinforced when Denmark refused to enact all the terms of the treaty. Thus, they decided to eliminate Denmark as an independent state, which would allow the Swedish army to move towards the continent.

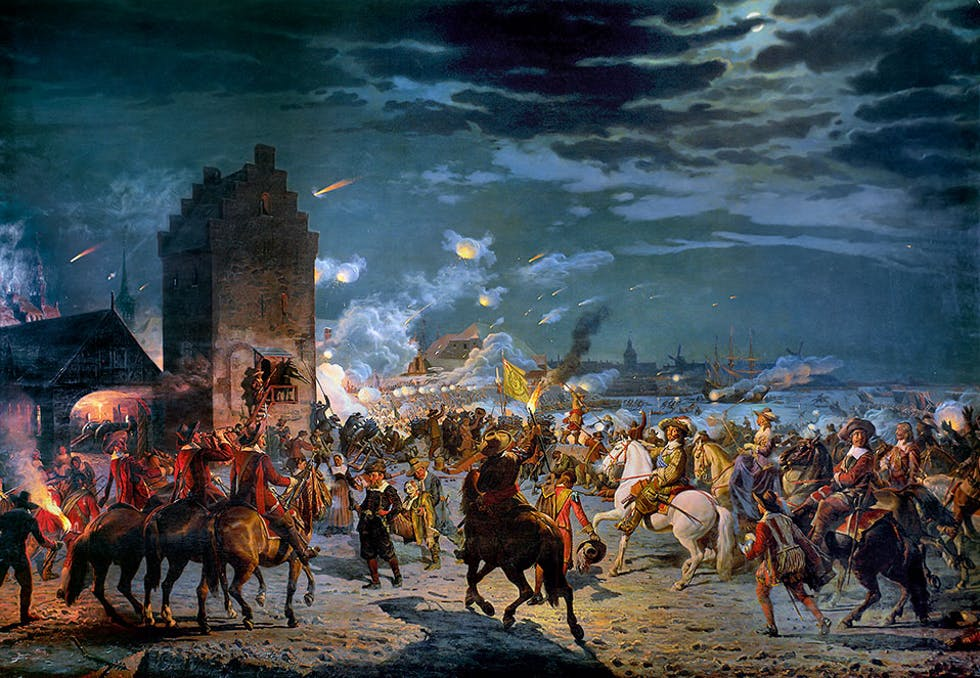
Stormen på København by Frederik Christian Lund from 1887

In mid-July of 1658, Swedish preparations were finished. On 6 August, around 60 cargo ships with an escort of 10 warships sailed towards Korsør with 5,700 men onboard. They planned to quickly disembark and then move towards Copenhagen and take the Danish fleet stationed in its harbour. After besieging the city for months, the Swedes led an unsuccessful assault on 11 February 1659, during which around 2,000 Swedes died.

In June of the same year, an Austro-Danish force led by Raimondo Montecuccoli, and supported by a Dutch fleet, attempted to land on the island of Funen. Although being able to make their way up on the beach, the Dano-Austrian troops were soon repelled by Carl Gustaf Wrangel, who inflicted heavy casualties on the attackers. The elector of Brandenburg, Frederick William, soon suggested a new plan to land, but they were thwarted by the Battle of Ebeltoft.

In August, when the Austrians, Poles, and Brandenburgians gave up in their attempts to land on Funen, an army of 14,000 or 17,000 Austrians was assembled in northern Silesia. Their objective was to invade Swedish Pomerania, Sweden's most important possession in Germany.

== Offensive ==
The offensive began in August when Jean-Louis Souches led the Imperial army into Pomerania. He sent a force of 1,300 men towards Greifenhagen to capture it after reaching Landsberg an der Warthe. Greifenhagen was easily captured, as it had no garrison. Another force of 600 men moved against Wildenbruch, forcing it to surrender after six days of resistance. Kammin was also captured by Johann Reichard Starhemberg with 1,000 captured. After reaching the village of Fritzow on 20 August, he continued to Wolin. They soon assaulted the main city on the island, also called Wolin, and captured it after the second assault, killing some 900 or 1,200 Swedes along with their commander, Elias Wolfgang Braun. Damm was also captured after Souches had received the necessary siege artillery.

A week after Souches' initial crossing into Pomerania, Frederick William left Jutland with 13,000 men, going towards western Pomerania. After more than a month, he finally arrived, capturing Warnemünde, Tribsees, Clempenow, Loitz, and Damgarten. He also attacked Greifswald which ultimately failed.

=== Siege of Stettin ===
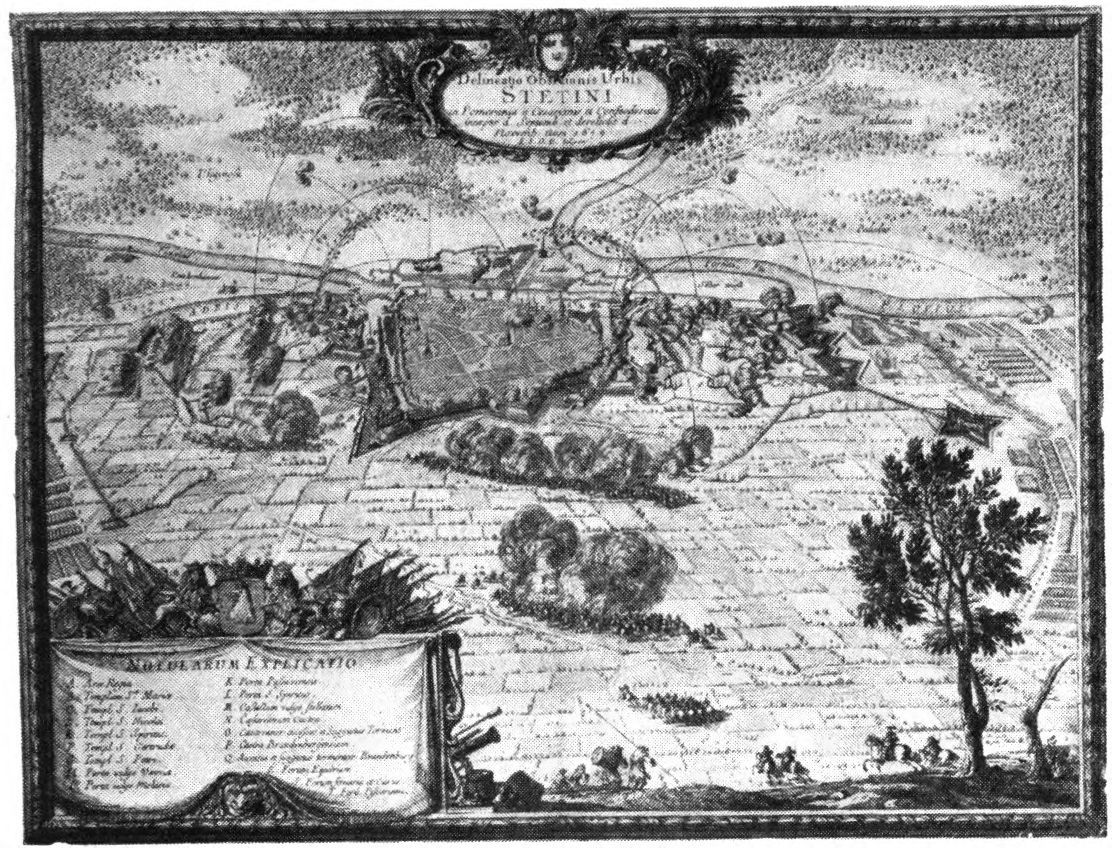
Depiction of the siege by Erik Dahlbergh

On 12 September, Austrian troops under Souches continued towards Stettin, setting up a camp outside of the city on 19 September after arriving with the main force. On 20 September, he received reinforcements in the fort, consisting of three infantry and two cavalry regiments. There were also Polish troops present. He sent a letter asking for the city's capitulation, which was promptly refused. He soon began bombarding the city, and this intensified after they established 13 artillery batteries with heavier siege artillery. The Swedish commander of the city, Paul Würtz, tried to calm the increasingly discouraged burghers, but was forced to send a delegation to Carl Gustaf Wrangel. The delegation came back on 25 October with news that reinforcements were on the way.

These reinforcements arrived on 31 October, and Würtz took advantage of the morale boost to completea sortie. At 11:30AM on St. Martin's day, the sortie began. The Austrians were taken by surprise, with many being killed or captured. The Swedes then advanced to their camp, buying time to allow for the Austrian artillery to be destroyed. The Swedes also destroyed a majority of the Brandenburgian artillery before withdrawing back into the city. The Swedes then, on 2 November, attacked Allied supply depots at both Curow and Nieder-Zahlen, both attacks being successful. Wrangel departed from the city on 5 November, and in the evening of the same day, the Allies withdrew as well.

During the siege, Wrangel had already reinforced Pomerania with 2,000 men. During this, he managed to disperse allied troops, capturing Swinemünde, and relieving Greifswald and Wolgast.

== Aftermath ==
After the lifting of the siege, the Austrians withdrew to Greifenhagen, while the Brandenburgers going to Löcknitz. They later withdrew completely out of Pomerania, which secured Sweden's dominion over it.

== See also ==
- Swedish Offensive into Prussia (1659) – 1659 offensive into Ducal Prussia

== Works cited ==
- von Essen, Michael Fredholm (2023). The Danish Wars, 1657-1660. Charles X's Wars. Vol. 3. Helion & Company. ISBN 9781915113603.
- Englund, Peter (2000). Den oövervinnerlige: om den svenska stormaktstiden och en man i dess mitt [The invincible: about the era of Swedish great power and a man in its midst] (in Swedish). Atlantis. ISBN 9789174869996.
- Barkman, Bertil C:son; Lundkvist, Sven; Tersmeden, Lars (1966). Kungl. Svea livgardes historia: 1632(1611)-1660 [History of the Royal Swedish Life Guards: 1632(1611)-1660] (in Swedish). Vol. 3:2. Stockholm: Stift. för Svea livgardes historia.
- Sundberg, Ulf (2010). Sveriges krig 1630-1814 [Sweden's wars 1630-1814] (in Swedish). Svenskt militärhistoriskt bibliotek. ISBN 9789185789634.
- Gihl, Torsten [in Swedish] (1913). Sverige och västmakterna under Karl X Gustafs andra krig med Danmark [Sweden and the Western Powers during Charles X Gustav's second Danish war] (in Swedish). Uppsala: K.W. Appelbergs Boktryckeri.
- Bonnesen, Sten [in Swedish] (1924). Karl X Gustav [Charles X Gustav] (in Swedish). Gleerups.
- Isacson, Claes-Göran [in Swedish] (2015). Karl X Gustavs krig: Fälttågen i Polen, Tyskland, Baltikum, Danmark och Sverige 1655-1660 [Wars of Charles X Gustav: The campaigns in Poland, Germany, the Baltics, Denmark and Sweden 1655-1660] (in Swedish). Historiska Media. ISBN 9789175450117.
