= Siege of Wolin =

1659 Austrian victory in the Second Northern War

Siege of Wolin/Wollin
- Part of the Second Northern War
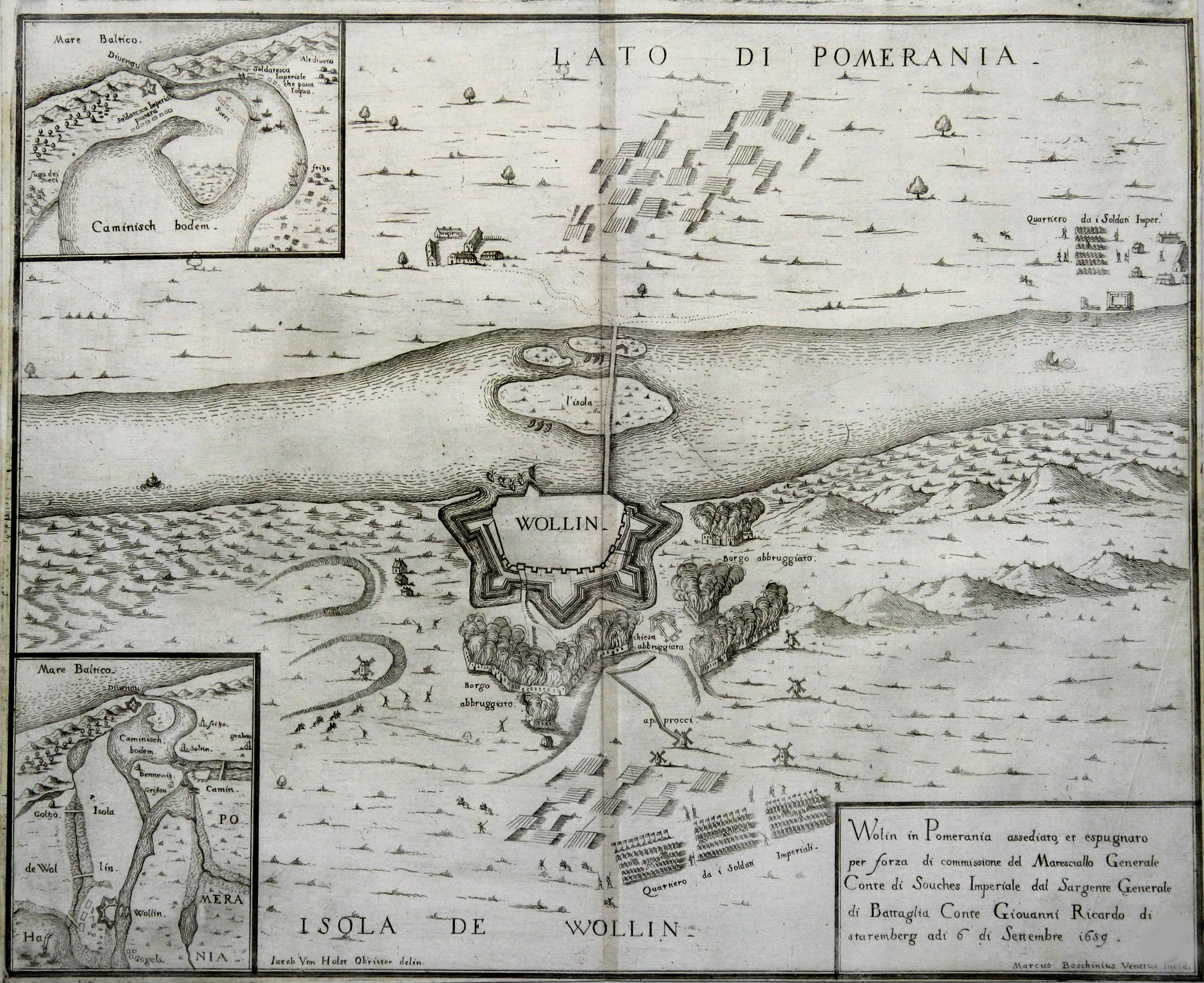
- Copper engraving from 1670 depicting the siege
Date	20–27 August 1659
Location	Wolin (Wollin in Swedish sources), island of Wolin 53°50′35″N 14°36′45″E
Result	Austrian victory
Territorial changes	Wolin and the rest of the island occupied by Austrian forces

Belligerents
(yes) Swedish Empire	Austria

Commanders and leaders
(yes) Elias Wolfgang Braun †	Johann von Starhemberg

Units involved
(yes) Wolin garrison	Unknown

Strength
1,000 men	1,400 men

The siege of Wolin, Wollin in Swedish sources: (Swedish: belägringen av Wollin) occurred from 21–27 August 1659 during the Second Northern War, as part of the Allied offensive into Swedish Pomerania. On 20 August, the Austrians landed on Wolin island, capturing two sconces at the mouth of the Dievenow, moving towards the city of Wolin soon after. They initially assaulted the city on 21 August, but were repelled. After receiving reinforcements, they launched a new, successful attack against the city.

== Background ==
In August 1659, during the Second Northern War, an Austrian force of 1,400 men under the command of Johann Richard von Starhemberg crossed the Oder river, capturing Kammin on the 11. On 20 August, they reached the village of Fritzow and began sailing over to the island of Wolin (Wollin in Swedish sources) in fishing boats.

== Siege ==
Once they arrived, the Austrians stormed two sconces at the mouth of the Dievenow at dawn, being quickly occupied. Soon after, the Austrians continued south, to attack the city of Wolin. According to reports, parts of Wolin were on fire, thus allowing an opportunity to attack. The fire was caused by the commander of Wolin, Elias Wolfgang Braun, having set fire to the village of Hagen which soon spread to Wolin.

After arriving at the northwest of the city, the Austrians began preparing for an attack. When the fire was at its worst on 21 August, they launched an assault on the walls on the northwest, which they believed would be undefended. However, the Swedish defenses remained, and the garrison of around 1,000 men repelled the first assault without difficulty. However, the Swedish commander was killed in the attack. After receiving reinforcements from the mainland, the Austrians launched a new assault on 27 August which was met with success. After five hours of fighting, they managed to break the Swedish resistance.

== Aftermath ==
On 28 August, the Swedish commander's body was discovered, being hard to identify from it having been trampled by horses. Initially, the Swedes were believed to have suffered 1,000–1,200 killed, but the number most likely did not surpass 400. According to Austrian reports, some 500 were captured. However, other sources claim that 1,200 Swedes were killed or captured. After the city's capture, around 10 cannons were taken as booty along with four infantry banners, five cavalry standards, and several guns.

== See also ==
- Siege of Stettin (1659) – Siege in 1659 during the Second Northern War of 1655–1660
- Swedish Offensive into Prussia (1659) – 1659 offensive into Ducal Prussia

== Works cited ==
- Isacson, Claes-Göran (2015). Karl X Gustavs krig: Fälttågen i Polen, Tyskland, Baltikum, Danmark och Sverige 1655-1660 [Wars of Charles X Gustav: The campaigns in Poland, Germany, the Baltics, Denmark and Sweden 1655-1660] (in Swedish). Historiska Media. ISBN 9789175450117.
- Englund, Peter (2000). Den oövervinnerlige: om den svenska stormaktstiden och en man i dess mitt [The invincible: about the era of Swedish great power and a man in its midst] (in Swedish). Atlantis. ISBN 9789174869996.
- Bonnesen, Sten (1924). Karl X Gustav [Charles X Gustav] (in Swedish). Gleerups.
