= Swedish offensive into Prussia (1659) =

1659 offensive into Ducal Prussia

- Part of the Dano-Swedish War (1658–1660)
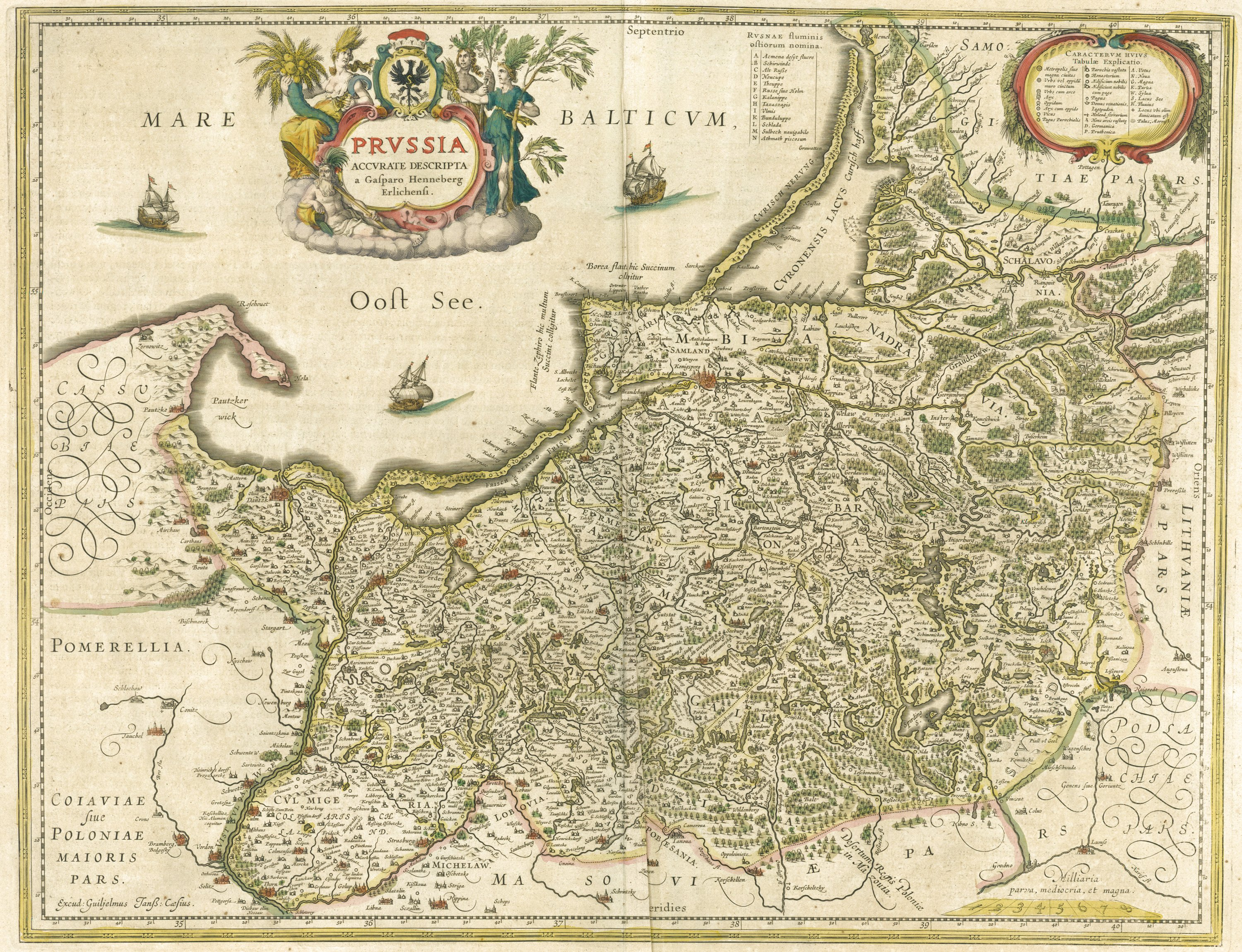
- 1645 map of Ducal Prussia in Theatrum Orbis Terrarum, sive Atlas Novus in quo Tabulæ et Descriptiones Omnium Regionum by Willem and Joan Blaeu
| Date | February–March 1659 |
| Location | Ducal Prussia |
| Result | Swedish victory (see § Aftermath) |
| Territorial changes | Large parts of Prussia are captured by Sweden |

Belligerents
| (yes) Swedish Empire | Brandenburg; Austria; Free City of Danzig; Polish–Lithuanian Commonwealth |

Commanders and leaders
| (yes) Paul Würtz (yes) Adolph John I (yes) Barthold von Bülow | Gottfried von Heister; Beaulieu; Krzysztof Grodzicki; Ernst von Görzke; Bogusław Radziwiłł |

Units involved
| Unknown | Imperial regiment Danzig Army; Dirschau garrison Stargard garrison |

Strength
| 4,000–4,300 men 2 guns 1 mortar | 18,000 men; 5,750; 5,000; 3,500; 1,000; Unknown amount of levies |

Casualties and losses
| Unknown | At least 60 killed |

The Swedish offensive into Prussia occurred from February to March 1659 during the Dano-Swedish War (1658–1660). It started when a Swedish force of 4,000 or 4,300 men under the command of Paul Würtz and Adolph John I entered Ducal Prussia, capturing several cities. The offensive was initially successful, but the gains were retaken after its end and did not lead to any lasting gains for the Swedes.

== Background ==
In late January or in the beginning of February in 1659, Paul Würtz marched into Ducal Prussia with 2,000–2,173 cavalry. Once there, he united his forces with Duke Adolph John's 1,500 cavalry, 700–800 infantry, two 3-pound cannons, and one 60-pound mortar from Marienburg. Other sources claim he had 2,300 men. Despite the limited artillery and infantry preventing major sieges, the Swedish troops were experienced and second to none in Prussia.

== Offensive ==
Once assembled at Czarne, the Swedes went on the offensive goal with the likely goal of forcing Frederick William into a separate peace treaty, or withdraw his troops from Jutland. Opposing the some 4,000–4,300 Swedes were 18,000 Allied troops. 5,750 Poles, 1,000 Imperial troops, 3,500 troops from Danzig, and 5,000 Brandenburgian troops. Additionally, there was an unknown number of levied troops.

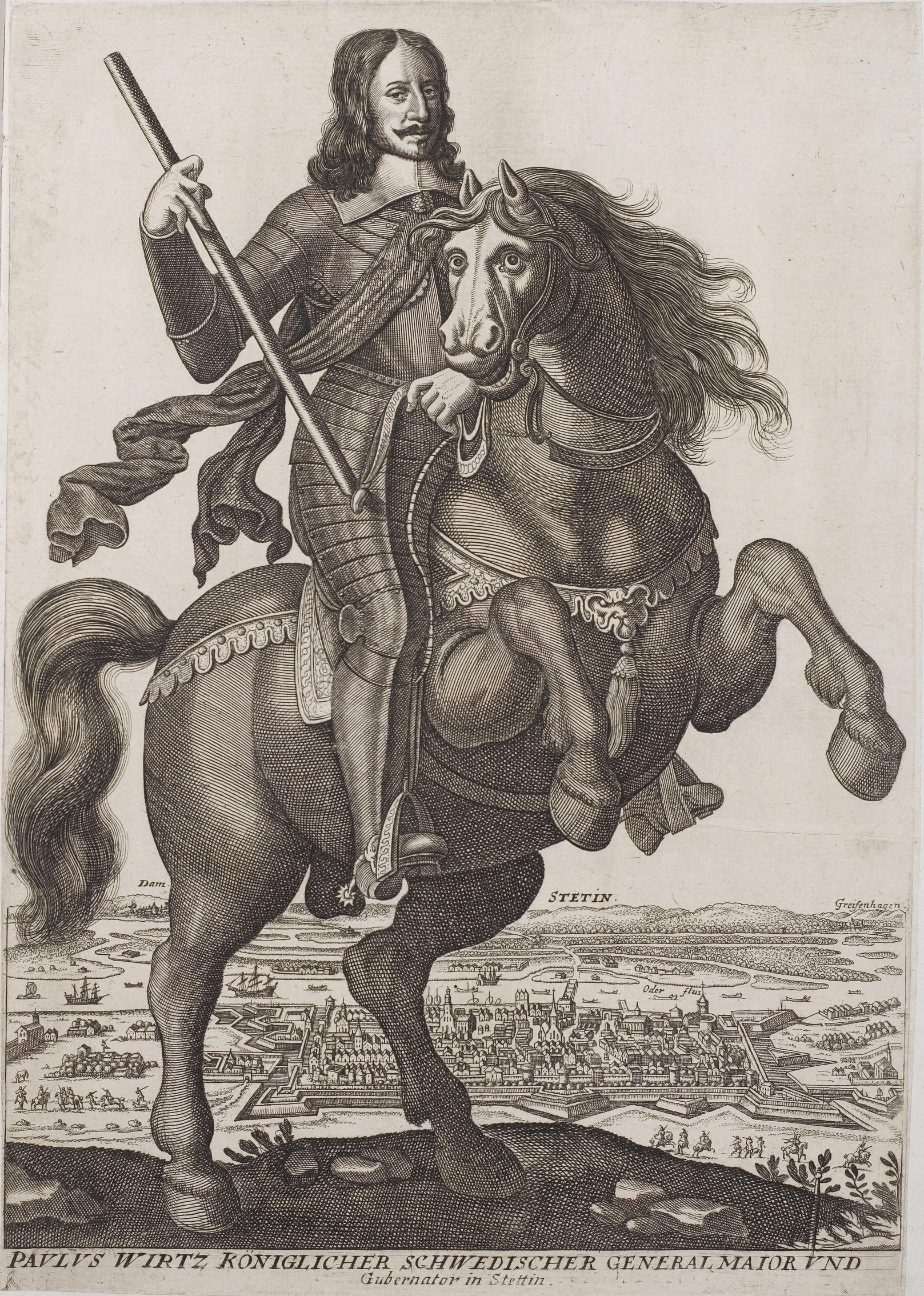
Depiction of Paul Würtz on horseback

Despite the disparity in numbers, the allies were both dispersed and for the most part in winter quarters. Due to this, the Swedes had initial success when they took Konitz in February. Additionally, they captured Kulm and Schwetz. They then proceeded into Ducal Prussia, capturing Saalfeld, Marienwerder, Mohrungen and Liebstadt after a series of skirmishes. They attempted to move towards Braunsberg, being stopped by the weak ice on the river Passarge. Adolph John returned to Marienburg to prevent an attack from Danzig against his rear.

The Swedes recaptured Dirschau in March, which was defended by Colonel Beaulieu with 300 men. Dirschau fell in three days, preventing reinforcements from arriving from Danzig. Consequently, communication from Danzig into inner Poland was cut. In a surprise attack, Stargard also fell after Major General Barthold von Bülow assaulted the city with 2,600 men without any losses, also looting Danziger Werder where he defeated a Brandenburgian force. He also attacked a force from the Danzig Army, killing 60 men.

== Aftermath ==
=== Allied counteroffensive ===
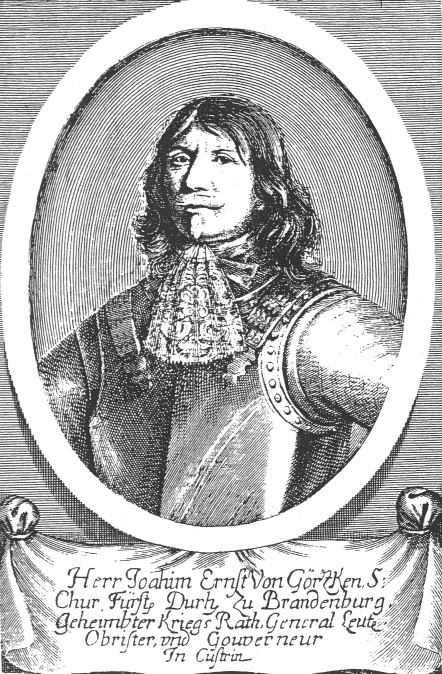
Copper engraving of Joachim Ernst von Görtzke from 1675

Despite their success, the Swedish offensive was unable to continue. In March, Krzysztof Grodzicki reassembled some Polish units. This force, along with 400 Imperial dragoons, went on the counteroffensive. Major General Ernst von Görzke did as well with 1,800 cavalry and 1,000 dragoons. They slowly began taking back Swedish gains, and Adolph John and Würtz ordered every garrison from smaller fortifications to withdraw. On one hand, the Swedes had failed to pull Frederick William out of the war, but on the other hand they had tied up major resources from the Commonwealth and Brandenburg.

Additionally, the Poles, Brandenburgians, and Imperials were unable to agree on strategy, and negotiations collapsed in March. Frederick William feared the return of the Swedes, but also did not trust John Casimir. In Ducal Prussia, the defenses consisted of an army under Prince Bogusław Radziwiłł consisting of 2,224 cavalry, 3,475 infantry and 1,540 dragoons. Radziwiłł and other commanders were cautious over Robert Douglas' presence in Samogitia and thus hesitant to fight in support for the coalition in Royal Prussia.

In May, Görzke tried to blockade Marienburg with 2,700 men, but was futile due to Sweden being able to reinforce and supply the city from the sea. Moreover, limited offensives remained from the Swedish side, one against Oliwa by Adolph John with 4,000 men and another led by Würtz against Putzig.

Despite the initial Swedish success, their new conquests did not last for long, and the campaign did not result in any lasting gain despite the considerable sacrifices made by the weakening of the troops during the marches.

== See also ==
- Invasion of Als (1658) – 1658 Polish–Brandenburgian invasion of Als
- Offensive into Swedish Pomerania (1659) – Invasion of Pomerania during the Second Northern War

== Works cited ==
- Englund, Peter (2000). Den oövervinnerlige: om den svenska stormaktstiden och en man i dess mitt [The invincible: about the era of Swedish great power and a man in its midst] (in Swedish). Atlantis. ISBN 9789174869996.
- von Essen, Michael Fredholm (2023). The Danish Wars, 1657-1660. Charles X's Wars. Vol. 3. Helion & Company. ISBN 9781915113603.
- Wittrock, G. (1918). "Adolf Johan". sok.riksarkivet.se. National Archives of Sweden.
- Isacson, Claes-Göran (2015). Karl X Gustavs krig: Fälttågen i Polen, Tyskland, Baltikum, Danmark och Sverige 1655-1660 [Wars of Charles X Gustav: The campaigns in Poland, Germany, the Baltics, Denmark and Sweden 1655-1660] (in Swedish). Historiska Media. ISBN 9789175450117.
