= Siege of Stettin (1659) =

Siege in 1659 during the Second Northern War of 1655–1660

- Part of the Northern War of 1655–1660
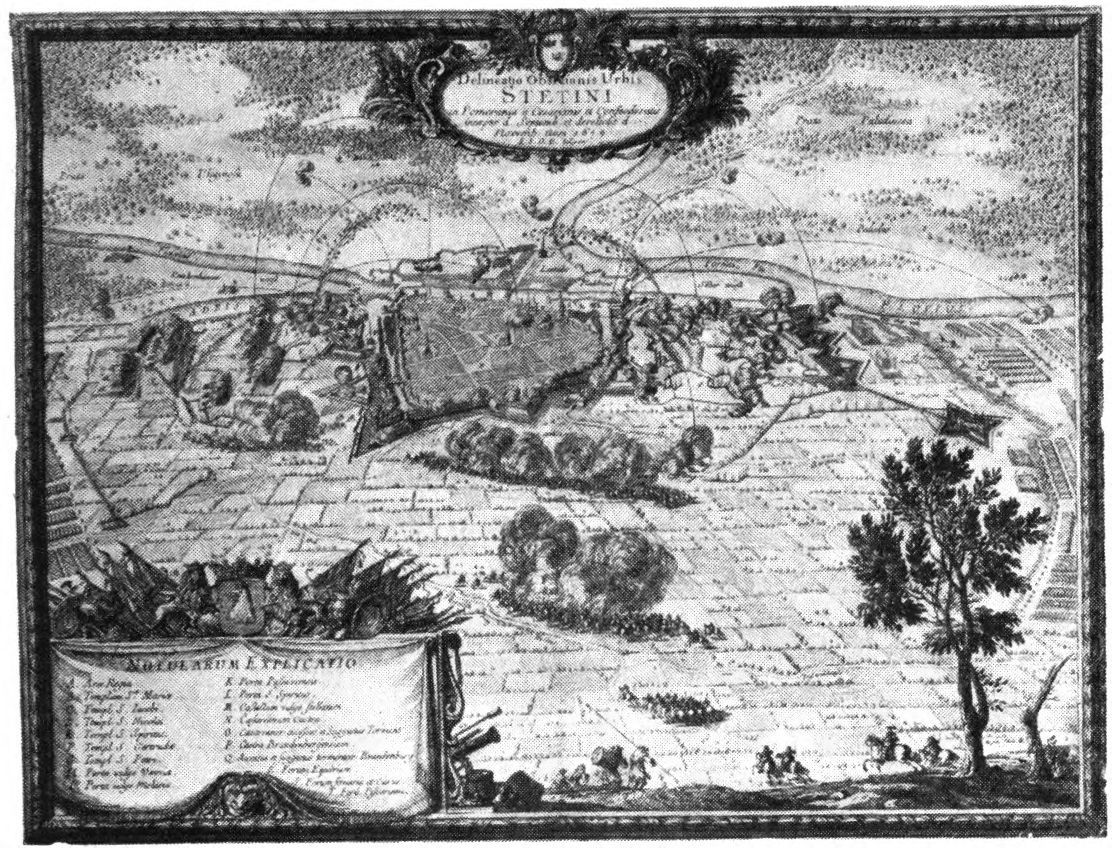
- Copper engraving depicting the siege from a bird’s eye view, by Erik Dahlbergh, 1696
Date	19 September – 5 November 1659
Location	Stettin (modern-day Szczecin, Poland), Swedish Pomerania 53°25′57″N 14°32′53″E
Result	Swedish victory
Territorial changes	Imperial-Brandenburgian withdrawal from Swedish Pomerania

Belligerents
(yes) Swedish Empire	Austria; Brandenburg

Commanders and leaders
(yes) Paul Würtz (yes) Carl Gustaf Wrangel (yes) Gustav Adolf Horn (yes) von Schwerin	Jean-Louis Raduit de Souches; Friedrich zu Dohna

Strength
c. 2,600 men (Note: The figure in the official roll calls was given as being 2,770–2,771 men, although many were sick, reducing the number closer to 2,600.); 36 guns 4 mortars	6,500–7,000 men 13 batteries of heavy siege guns Numerous field guns

The siege of Stettin (Note: Swedish: belägringen av Stettin; German: belagerung von Stettin) occurred from 19 September to 5 November 1659 during the Second Northern War of 1655–1660 in the Swedish city of Stettin (modern-day Szczecin, Poland) and resulted in a Swedish victory.

In mid-September 1659, an Austrian/Imperial army of 5,000 men under General Jean-Louis Raduit de Souches crossed the Reglitz and Oder rivers to besiege the city of Stettin. This Allied offensive into Swedish Pomerania was supported by 1,500–2,000 Brandenburgian reinforcements under Friedrich zu Dohna, possibly in addition to a Polish-Lithuanian force.

Having made an unsuccessful request for surrender, the Allied forces besieged the city. On 7 October, they captured a redoubt on the nearby Oberwiek Mountain, and by the middle of that month, they had dug their trenches right up to the Passauer bastion and the curtain that led to the Holy Spirit bastion. On 20 October, after the Allies had been reinforced with heavy siege guns, they began a new concentrated bombardment of the city after a second failed request for surrender. The city's burghers soon became discouraged, requesting reinforcements from the Swedish Lord High Admiral Carl Gustaf Wrangel in Stralsund, which were granted. On 1 November, the Swedes sortied with a force of around 900 men, catching the Austrians by surprise, killing and capturing hundreds and destroying a large number of the Allies' guns. On 3 November, Swedish forces made successful attacks on depots storing the besieger's goods and equipment.

On 5 November, Wrangel departed from the city, promising continued reinforcements. Later that same day, in the evening, the Allies raised their siege of Stettin, probably as a result of a combination of heavy losses and low morale due to Swedish reinforcements and Wrangel's presence in Stettin. The Austrians and Brandenburgians withdrew to Greifenhagen and Löcknitz, respectively, and later withdrew from Pomerania entirely, thus securing Sweden's dominion well into the 18th century.

== Background ==
After his highly successful war with Denmark and the Treaty of Roskilde, Charles X Gustav wished to turn his forces towards Brandenburg and Austria. However, the Swedes did not entirely trust the Danes to uphold the treaty, these suspicions being reinforced when Denmark refused to enact all the terms of the treaty. Thus, Sweden decided to eliminate Denmark as an independent state, which would allow the Swedish army to move towards the continent.

In mid-July of 1658, Swedish preparations were finished. On 6 August, around 60 cargo ships with an escort of 10 warships sailed towards Korsør with 5,700 men onboard. They planned to quickly disembark and then move towards Copenhagen and take the Danish fleet stationed in its harbour. Once war had been confirmed, Denmark activated several treaties, especially its 1649 treaty with the Dutch Republic, obliging the Republic to aid Denmark in cases of foreign aggression. After besieging Copenhagen for months, the Swedes led an unsuccessful assault on 11 February 1659, during which around 2,000 Swedes died.

=== Anti-Swedish Coalition ===
Map showing Swedish Pomerania (Svenska Pommern) on the southern Baltic coast in 1648

During negotiations in the Dano-Swedish War of 1657–1658, the Dutch Republic, the Margraviate of Brandenburg, the Polish–Lithuanian Commonwealth, and Austria formed a coalition against Sweden in support of Denmark. However, the coalition fell apart when Denmark signed the Treaty of Roskilde. The coalition reunited in September 1658 after King Charles went to war with Denmark again, forming an army totalling 30,100 men. The army consisted of 14,500 Brandenburgian troops, 10,600 Imperial troops, and 5,000 Polish troops.

In June 1659, an Austro-Danish force led by Raimondo Montecuccoli and supported by a Dutch fleet attempted to land on the island of Funen. Although being able to make their way up on the beach, the Dano-Austrian troops were later repelled by Carl Gustaf Wrangel, who inflicted heavy casualties on the attackers. The elector of Brandenburg, Frederick William, suggested a new plan to land on Funen, but it was thwarted by the Battle of Ebeltoft.

In August, the Austrians, Poles, and Brandenburgians gave up in their attempts to land on Funen, and an army of either 14,000 or 17,000 Austrians was assembled in northern Silesia to invade Swedish Pomerania.

== Prelude ==
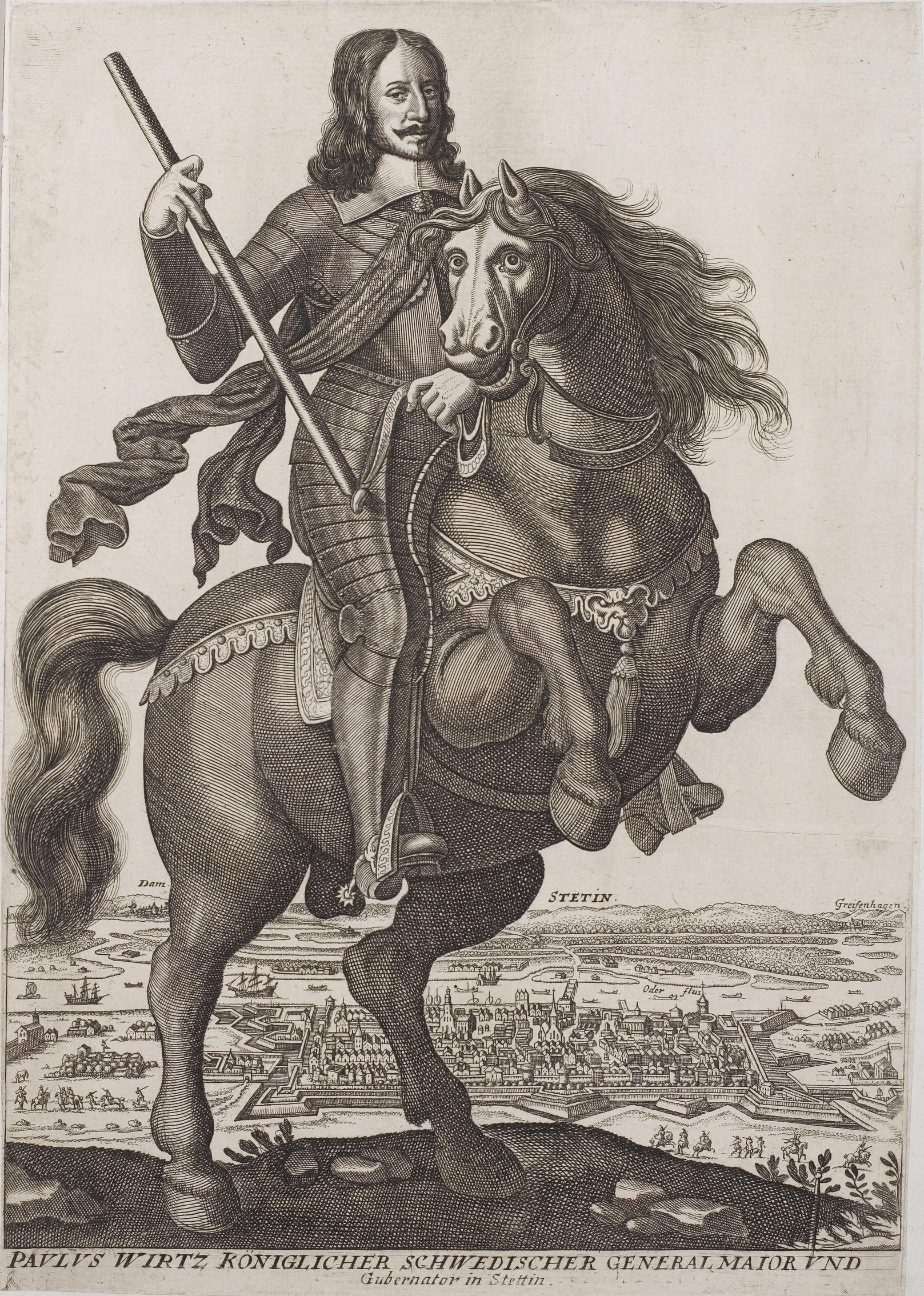
Engraving of Swedish Pomeranian General Major and Governor of Stettin Paul Würtz backdropped by Stettin, probably by Robert Weiss, 17th century

In August 1659, the anti-Swedish coalition forces began the offensive into Swedish Pomerania. They quickly captured Greifenhagen, Wildenbruch, and Damm. This offensive did not go unopposed, however, as Swedish Lord High Admiral Carl Gustaf Wrangel landed in Pomerania from Sweden with 2,000 men sometime in October, and with these forces he recaptured Greifswald and Wolgast, dispersing any opposing troops, and captured Swinemünde. The Elector of Brandenburg, Frederick William, had become cautious of the Swedish threat and consequently retreated with his forces towards Demmin. Here, he joined forces with the Brandenburgian–Prussian General Otto Christoph von Sparr, and together they captured Demmin after a short month-long siege on 7 September.

In mid-September, Austrian General Jean-Louis Raduit de Souches crossed the Reglitz and Oder rivers before continuing on towards Stettin with 5,000 men with the intention of capturing the city. Overall, Stettin's fortifications were generally in good condition at this time, although the star redoubt and older fortifications in the southwest were not manned. The city's immediate defences and fortifications were further bolstered by Paul Würtz, the Swedish Pomeranian General Major and Governor of Stettin.

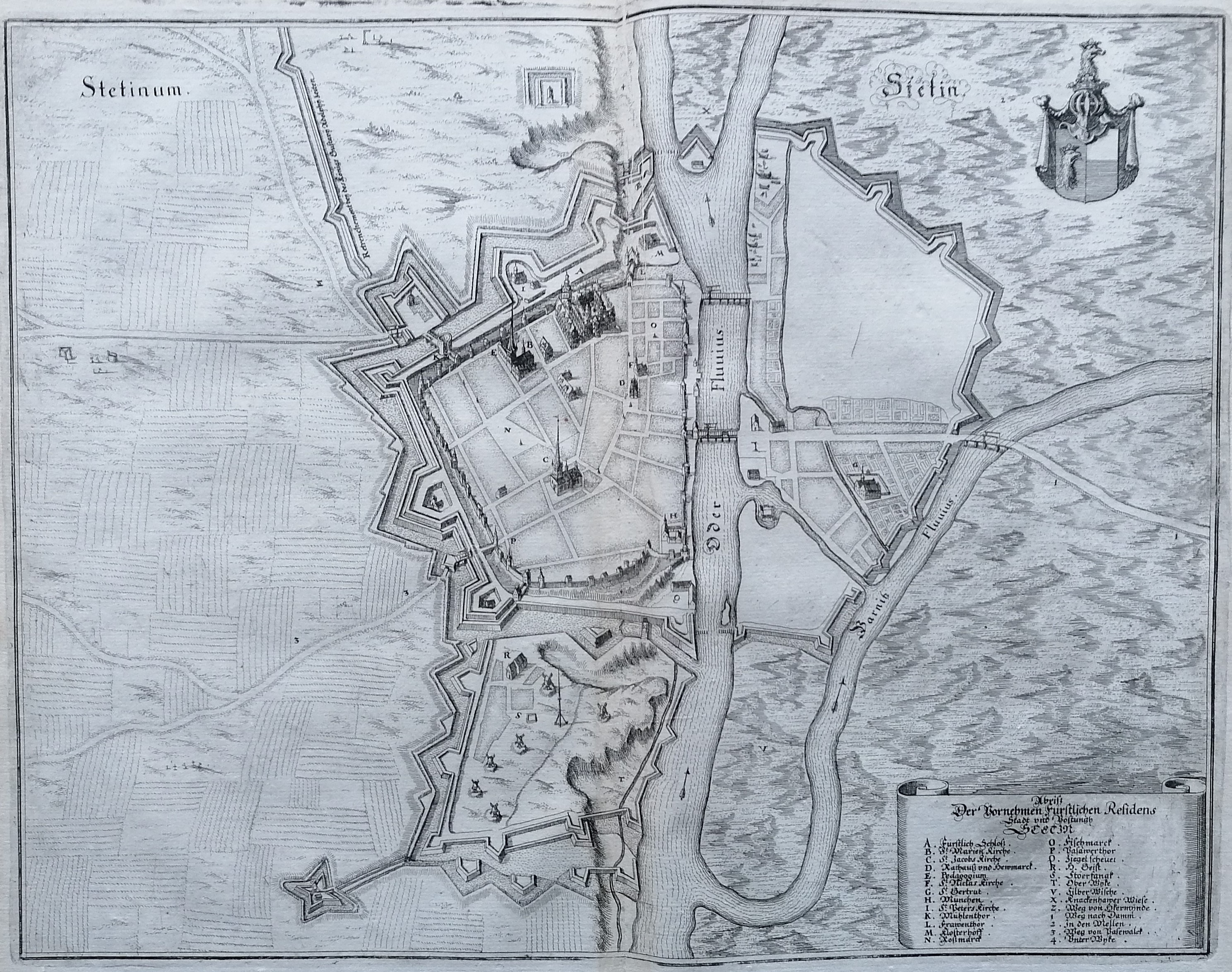
Oberwiek, the star redoubt, and the older fortifications can be seen illustrated south on this engraving of Stettin, by Matthäus Merian the Elder, 1652

Würtz had a redoubt constructed atop the north-eastern summit of the nearby Oberwiek Mountain, a hill in the Stettin Hills range. This was done to strengthen Stettin's southwestern defences, and to deny a potential besieging force from occupying the advantageous heights. If occupied and used by enemy guns, these heights could otherwise be used to bombard both the city fortifications and the inner city from above.

According to Swedish roll calls, the Stettin garrison consisted of 2,770 to 2,771 men. In reality, there were around 2,600 able-bodied men, taking into account the ones who were sick. In addition to this, the Swedes had 36 guns and 4 mortars. Stettin also had a militia of 11 companies, but these companies would generally only assist in guarding the ramparts. Stettin had around one month's worth of ammunition in storage. Under Würtz's instructions, a fire brigade was also raised from the city's civilian population in an attempt to mitigate the impact of a bombardment by a potential besieging force.

== Siege ==
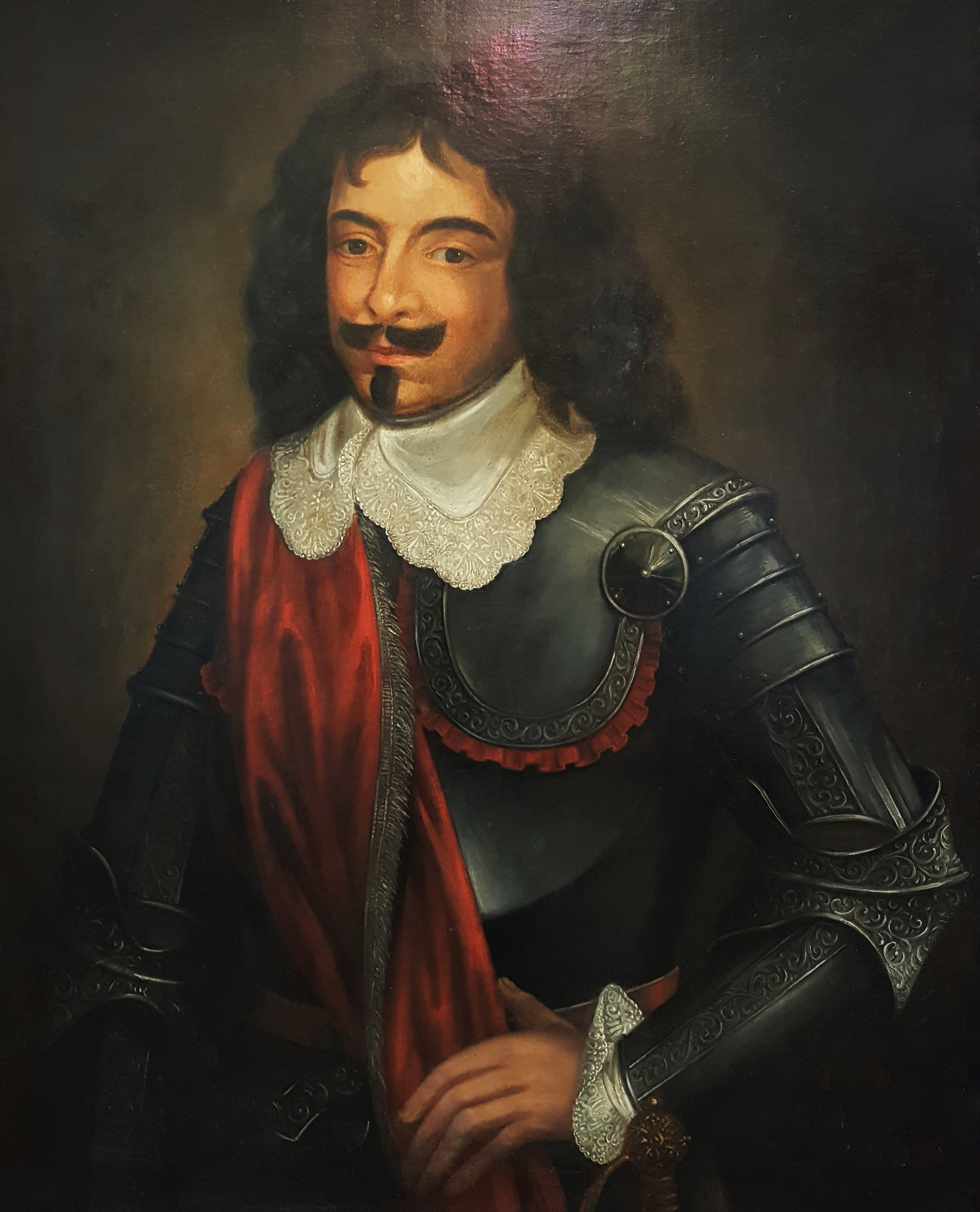
Anonymous painting of Austrian General Jean-Louis Raduit de Souches, 17th century

On 12 September, Swedish officer von Schwerin reported to Würtz that Imperial troops had begun marching from their camp at Damm. After receiving confirmation that these troops were heading towards Stettin, von Schwerin employed scorched earth tactics and razed nearby villages. This was done to make a siege of Stettin more difficult by preventing the Allies from living off of the land. On 16 September, an advanced guard of Austrian cavalry arrived to the south of Stettin and blockaded the roads heading into the city, and on 19 September, de Souches himself approached Stettin with his main force. He occupied and established a camp at the unmanned star redoubt and the old fortifications. The following morning on 20 September, Brandenburgian reinforcements arrived under the command of the Governor of the Principality of Orange, Friedrich zu Dohna, who was serving as an officer for the Electorate of Brandenburg at the time. These reinforcements numbered 1,500 to 2,000 men in the form of two cavalry regiments and three infantry regiments. (Note: Swedish archaeologist Bror Emil Hildebrand claimed that there was also a Polish force present during the siege, although this is disputed by others, like Swedish historian Anders Fryxell, who claimed the Poles had withdrawn to their winter quarters and did not participate in the fighting in Swedish Pomerania.)

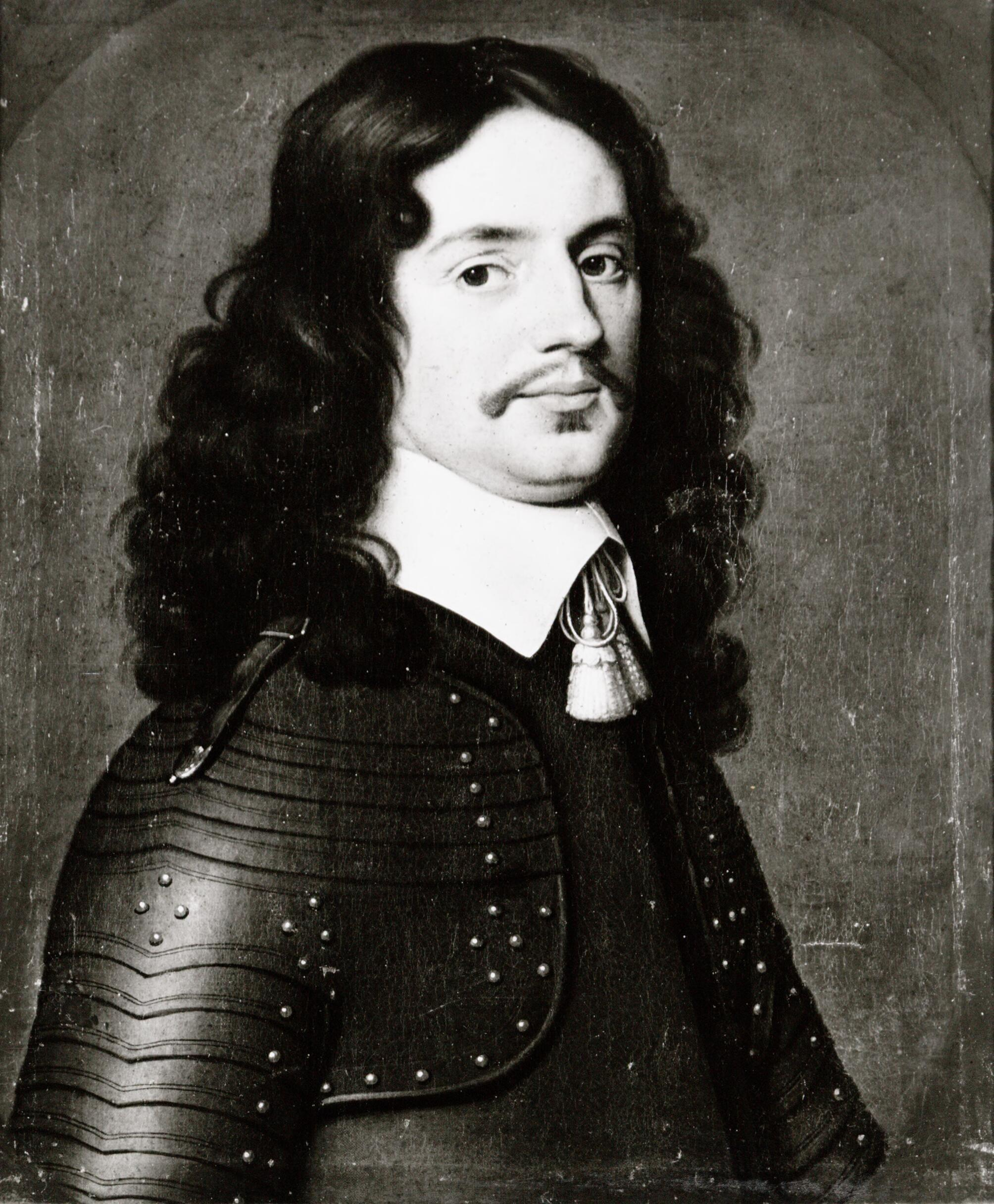
Painting of the Governor of the Principality of Orange in Brandenburgian service, Friedrich zu Dohna, by Gerard van Honthorst, 1649

Stettin was soon issued a request to surrender, which was quickly refused. The loyalty of the city's burghers surprised de Souche, who had incorrectly believed that they would see the Brandenburgians as liberators and the Swedes as occupiers. The burghers likely feared damage or looting of their property in the immediate aftermath of the city's capture. Consequently, despite lacking in heavy siege guns, de Souche was forced to besiege the city. Over the following month, the Allies began creating siege works around Stettin, despite Swedish bombardment and continuous sorties, and on 29 September, the Allied batteries of field guns began opening fire, though this was to little effect and did not cause notable damage. The Austrians captured the redoubt on Oberwiek Mountain on 7 October, and by mid-October their siege trenches, which were being dug closer and closer towards Stettin, were only some 30 to 80 paces from the Passauer bastion and the curtain wall going from it to the Holy Spirit bastion.

On the night of 18 October, the Swedes launched a powerful sortie through Fruporten, one of the city's gates, against the foremost Allied siege works, managing to destroy them after fierce fighting. The Allied success on the southwestern front with the fall of the redoubt on Oberwiek Mountain worried the Swedes, but the Allies had not yet been able to completely block the waterways, which came from this direction and flowed into the city.

On 20 October, the Allies constructed 13 batteries with newly arrived heavy siege artillery, and after another failed request for surrender, they began bombarding Stettin. This bombardment quickly began to damage parts of the city and its defences, but any fires that broke out were promptly quelled by Stettin's newly formed fire brigade, thus preventing catastrophic damage to the city. In late October, the Austrians managed to take control over two points in the wall in front of the Passauer bastion after fierce fighting. At the captured points in front of the Passauer bastion, de Souches established multiple breach batteries to direct concentrated fire on specific parts of the walls to create breaches that could be exploited by his men. The batteries made the situation critical on this front for the Swedes. By this point, the city's garrison had suffered a significant reduction in strength from combat losses and disease.

By early October, the city's burghers had become demoralised after the loss of the redoubt on Oberwiek Mountain, and the Allied bombardment only helped to exacerbate this. They told Würtz that they believed the city's only hope was in receiving reinforcements. Würtz initially tried to calm them but eventually permitted a delegation to be sent to the Swedish commander Carl Gustaf Wrangel, in the Baltic coastal city of Stralsund, some 85 miles (137 km) to the northwest of Stettin, to request reinforcements. On 25 October, the delegation returned with news that Wrangel had agreed to send reinforcements. When the Austrians finally broke through the main fortifications on the southwestern front, the burghers requested that another delegation should be sent to Wrangel to insist on urgency. Würtz once more tried to calm the burghers, as he was acutely aware of the Allies' heavy losses, but permitted another delegation to be sent anyway.

=== Reinforcements and major sortie ===
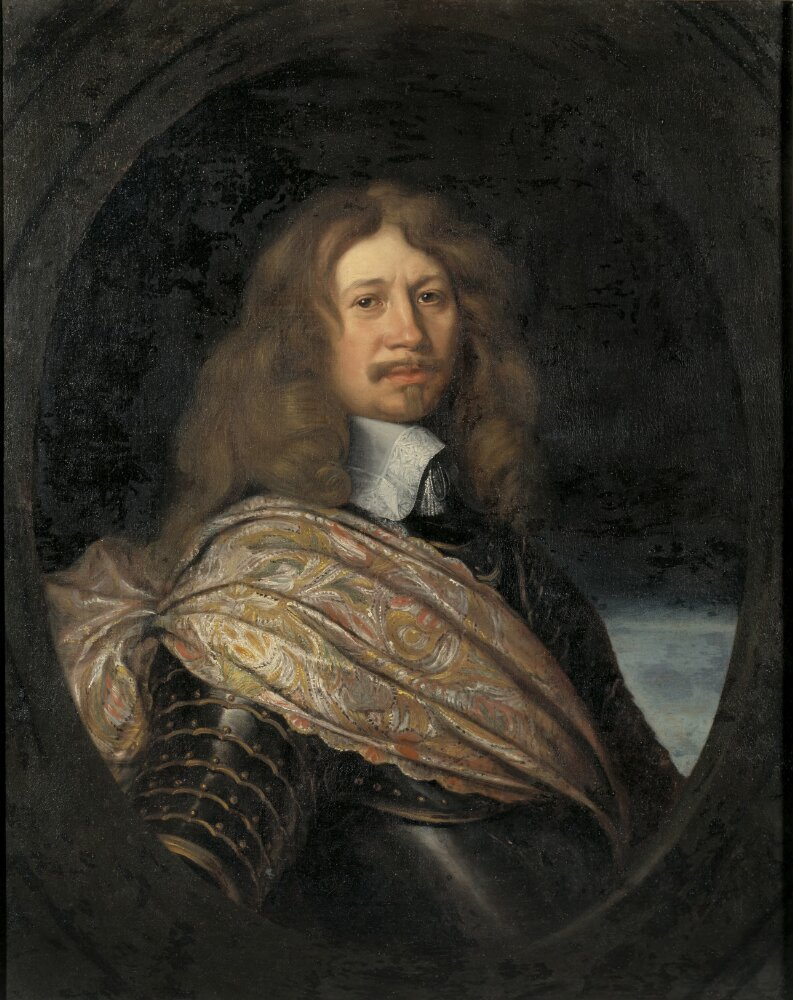
Painting of Swedish Lord High Admiral Carl Gustaf Wrangel, by Matthäus Merian the Younger, 1652

On 27 October, Wrangel was finally able to send reinforcements to the city (and would arrive later himself). This was in the form of a squadron under Major Örneklau from the Västgöta-Dal Regiment. By 31 October, 150 to 160 men from the squadron had already arrived. Würtz took advantage of the morale boost brought by the reinforcements and began preparing for a major sortie, or as Würtz put it: "I judged it best to strike something significant against the enemy, the sooner the better." Würtz planned a sortie on the trenches and breach batteries in front of the Passauer bastion for 1 November, Saint Martin's Day, hoping to catch the Allies off-guard while celebrating the holy day. He gathered a force of 600 to 700 infantry and 130 cavalry for the attack, along with some artillery personnel, 40 burghers, and 100 armed peasant volunteers.

On 1 November, before sunrise, he ordered two small units to position themselves on either side of the Passauer bastion. The main force (with an infantry unit commanded by von Schwerin) advanced under the command of Würtz and moved along a moat towards the ravelin between the King's bastion and the Passauer bastion. At around 11:30 a.m., the attack was launched. The Austrian troops were taken by surprise, either being killed or captured. The Swedes then advanced towards the Austrian camp to try to buy time for the guns and works to be destroyed, but after the Austrians regrouped, the Swedes were soon forced to withdraw back into Stettin. During the sortie, the Swedes only had enough time to destroy a few of the Austrian guns but also killed 150 to 200 men and captured 100 to 130 men, all while suffering minimal casualties themselves and destroying the majority of the Brandenburgian artillery. Despite most of the Austrian guns being left intact, the sortie's other significant achievements meant that it was still declared as successful.

=== Attacks on Curow and Nieder-Zahlen ===
For some time, Würtz had been aware of a large quantity of Allied siege supplies stored at Nieder-Zahden and Curow and planned to either capture or destroy them. He gained more information on these supplies from the prisoners taken during the sortie on 1 November, and he decided to act on this information the following day. However, von Schwerin, who was assigned the mission, was not able to gather the necessary number of boats, and the attack was delayed until the next day. On the night of 3 November, von Schwerin and a couple of hundred infantry boarded around thirty rowing boats and sailed towards Curow, while Captain Gustav Adolf Horn took the remaining troops towards Nieder-Zahlen. Once von Schwerin and his men arrived at Curow, he attacked the redoubt built to protect the supplies, capturing its entire garrison in the process. The supply depot within contained some 300 large barrels of flour and various merchant goods. The Swedes destroyed most of the barrels, greatly reducing the besieging forces' food stores just before winter, and loaded the rest onto their boats before rowing away and back to Stettin.

Meanwhile, once Horn and his men arrived at Nieder-Zahlen, 11 boats were spotted along the shore, loaded with gunpowder, fuses, grenades, and some more basic goods. In addition to this, there was a long column of horse-drawn wagons present to bring the supplies and goods back to the besieging Austrian camp. At Nieder-Zahlen, another redoubt had been erected to defend the supplies, but Horn landed his men ashore without the knowledge of the redoubt's garrison and attacked it, disarming its garrison. The Swedes again destroyed several hundred barrels of flour and loaded the remaining cargo onto their boats before leaving for Stettin. Both Schwerin's and Horn's forces arrived back to Stettin successful on 4 November.

== Aftermath ==
Carl Gustaf Wrangel departed Stettin on 5 November, promising the burghers continued reinforcements along with compensation for damage to their property incurred during the siege. Later that evening, the Austrians and Brandenburgians abandoned their positions and raised the siege, with the Austrians departing to Greifenhagen and the Brandenburgians to Löcknitz. Wrangel speculated that this was due to the besieging infantry having been "ruined" by heavy materiel and manpower losses and therefore having been made unsuitable to continue the siege into the winter. Others speculated that the Austrians had lost their morale due to Swedish reinforcements or simply because of Wrangel's presence in Stettin alone, although the reason was likely a combination of all of these factors.

Later, the Allies withdrew from Pomerania, leaving minor garrisons at Demmin, Dąbie, Wolin, and Kamień. This secured Sweden's dominion over the province until 1720, after the Great Northern War, when much of it was lost to Brandenburg-Prussia. The remainder was lost to Denmark in 1814 in the Treaty of Kiel.
