= Battle of Sandomierz =

1656 battle

- Part of the Deluge
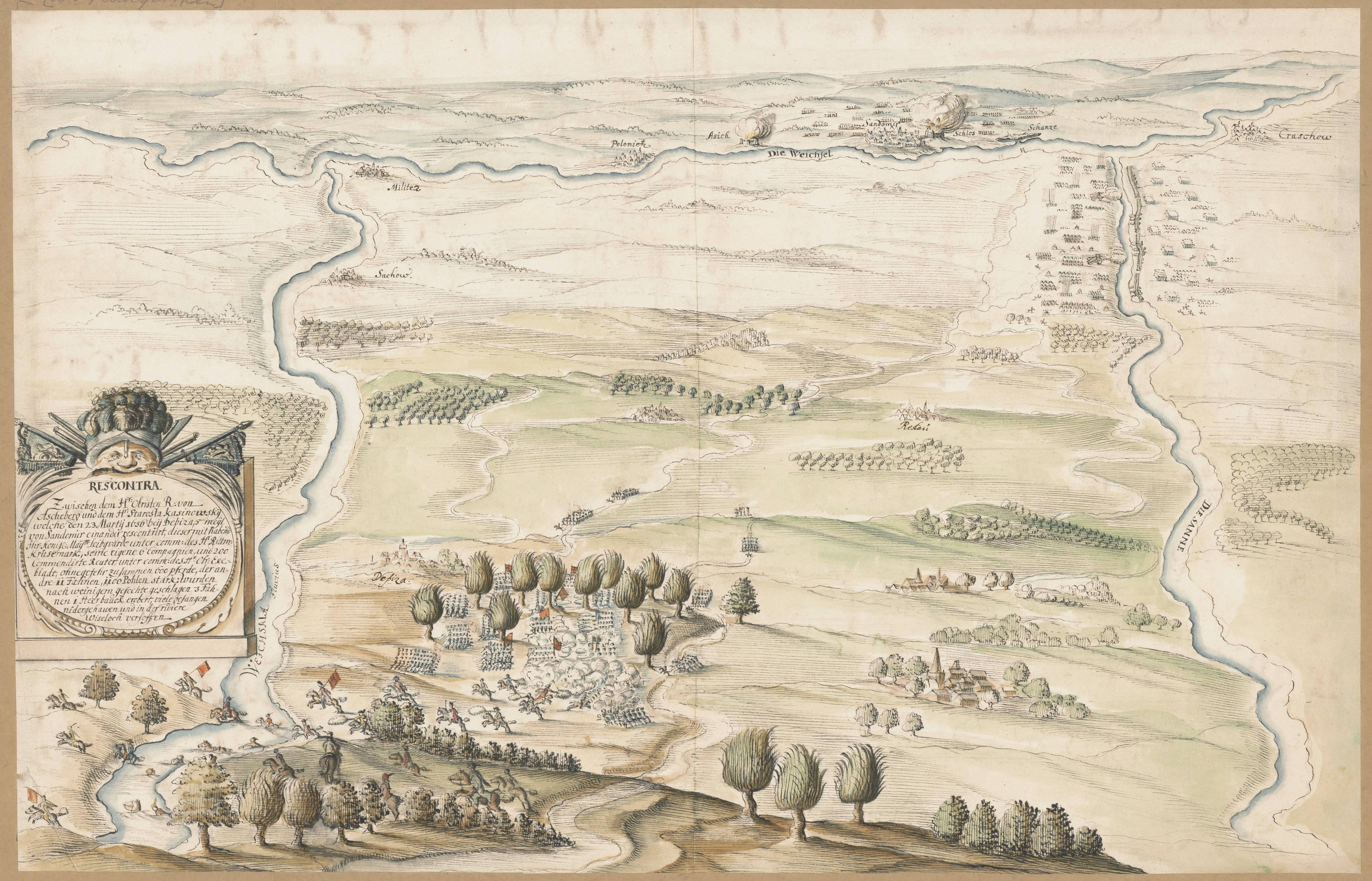
- One of many skirmishes fought (Dębica) near Sandomierz
Date	March 24–26, 1656
Location	Sandomierz, Poland
Result	Swedish victory

Belligerents
Swedish Empire	Polish–Lithuanian Commonwealth

Commanders and leaders
(Swedish Empire) Charles X Gustav	(Polish–Lithuanian Commonwealth) Stefan Czarniecki (Polish–Lithuanian Commonwealth) Jerzy Lubomirski

Strength
8,000	More than 16,000

Casualties and losses
Light	1,000

The Battle of Sandomierz was a battle between the Polish–Lithuanian Commonwealth and Sweden during the Deluge in 1656.

== Prelude ==
On March 20, 1656, Charles X Gustav with his army of 8.000 men was trapped between the rivers San and Vistula, chased by a Polish-Lithuanian army of about 10.000 men. On the western side of Vistula was the town and castle of Sandomierz, which had a Swedish crew. The Swedes thought to cross the river at this point and then continue their march along the Polish coast.

== Battle ==
On March 24 the bridgehead, the city and the castle were attacked by Jerzy Sebastian Lubomirski, with a Polish corps of 6,000 men. In the castle there were large stores of ammunition that Swedes the needed. The castle was held by Colonel Cronlood, with barely 280 men. However, Swedish garrison managed to flee down the river San in boats, saving most of the provisions, while the main army's artillery shelled the Poles. However, 4,000 grenades were left with matches lit, so the castle was blown in the air, together with several hundred Poles.

In the evening 300 Swedish soldiers departed from the Swedish camp, and in three boats crossed the San River. The troops immediately removed the Polish guards and more Swedish troops crossed the river, including cavalry who swam over with their horses. Lithuanians who held this river bank believed the entire Swedish army was on them, and fled in panic.

On March 26, Swedish army built a bridge over the River San, and the entire army crossed over. They took the abandoned camp left by the Lithuanians, and got a rest of a night. On April 5, they were in security inside Warsaw's walls.
