= Landing at Ystad (1659) =

1659 Danish landing at Ystad

- Part of the Dano-Swedish War (1658–1660)
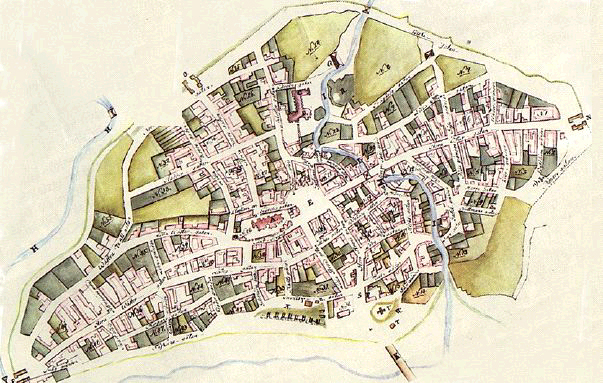
- Reconstructed map of Ystad from the 18th century
Date	7–? September 1659
Location	Ystad, Sweden 55°25′N 13°50′E
Result	Swedish victory
Territorial changes	Status quo

Belligerents
Denmark–Norway	(yes) Swedish Empire

Commanders and leaders
Frederik Ahlefeldt	(yes) Gustaf Otto Stenbock

Units involved
8 cavalry companies	(yes) Ystad garrison

Strength
460 infantry and cavalry 8 ships	c. 1,000 men

Casualties and losses
Unknown	Unknown

The landing at Ystad, also called the Ystad coup (Swedish: Ystadskuppen) occurred on 7 September 1659 and began when Major General Frederik Ahlefeldt captured Ystad with 8 ships and 460 men. Soon after, groups of Snapphanar quickly organized into groups as large as 60 to support the Danish landing, arriving at Ystad only to find out the true size of the Danish force. A few days later, the Danes were forced to withdraw after several small skirmishes with Gustaf Otto Stenbock. The snapphanar were also eventually forced to get on stolen boats and sail towards Bornholm and Zealand after being hunted down by Stenbock.

== Background ==
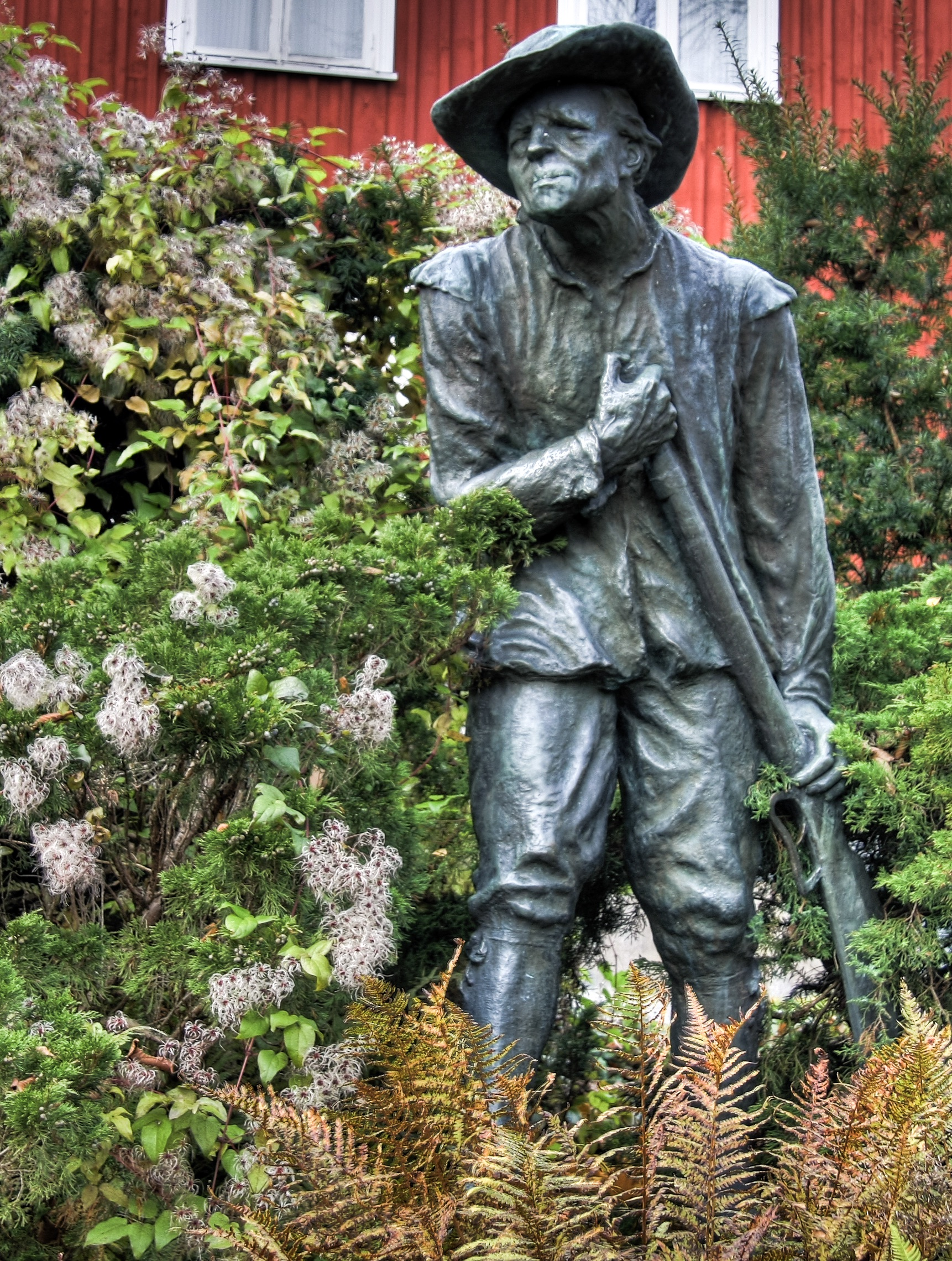
1934 Statue of Snapphanen by Axel Ebbe depicting Lille Mads, a snapphane.

In 1659, a large Snapphane uprising broke out in Scania, spreading from Blekinge to Småland and Kullaberg. Threats, sabotage, ambushes, and skirmishes became commonplace, but the revolt remained unorganized.

After a failed Danish attempt to regain Scania in December 1658, such a desire reignited. The Danes wished to take advantage of the rising unrest in Scania to retake the province from Sweden.

== Landing ==
On 5 September, Major General Frederik Ahlefeldt sailed from Copenhagen with eight ships and 460 men. The Dutch intended to come to their support two days later with 1,200 men. On 7 September, the Danes came up to Ystad. Their ships were flying Swedish colors, but the small garrison in the city was not fooled and retreated after a short battle. The Danish capture of the city reached the snapphanar; they interpreted it as a signal for the imminent liberation of Scania and that it was time to openly fight the Swedes. Several groups of up to 60 men went out of the forests, going along the Romeleåsen and Linderödsåsen and through Fyledalen to unite with the Danes. The Danes intended to "revive the morale of the people of this province, who unwillingly bear the Swedish yoke."

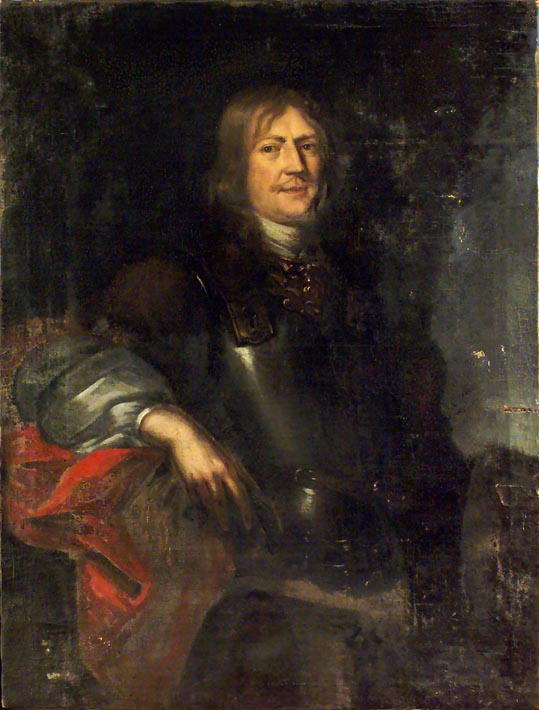
Portrait of Gustaf Otto Stenbock by David Klöcker Ehrenstrahl

On the way to Ystad, they attacked Swedish patrols. However, when they arrived at Österlen, they realized that the Danish force only consisted of eight companies of cavalry, and smaller than anticipated. Later, news also arrived of Gustaf Otto Stenbock's march towards Ystad with around 1,000 men gathered at Dalby cathedral. He blocked roads northwards, and with the threat of his arrival, the Danes returned to their ships and sailed away within only a few days after a few short skirmishes.

Stenbock's force now began hunting the snapphanar that had arrived in Ystad, with most fleeing onto stolen boats over to Bornholm or Zealand.

== Aftermath ==
The ensuing exodus did not mean that Scania was at peace, but it saw the beginning of the end of the Snapphane movement.

== Works cited ==
- Englund, Peter (2000). Den oövervinnerlige: om den svenska stormaktstiden och en man i dess mitt [The invincible: about the era of Swedish great power and a man in its midst] (in Swedish). Atlantis. ISBN 9789174869996.
- Stenbock, Reinhold (1928). Östgöta kavalleriregemente, 1618-1699 [Östgöta Cavalry Regiment, 1618-1699] (in Swedish). I. Haeggströms boktryckeri a.b.
- Bonnesen, Sten (1924). Karl X Gustav [Charles X Gustav] (in Swedish). Gleerups.
