= Siege of Nakskov (1659) =

1659 siege of Nakskov

- Part of the Dano-Swedish War (1658–1660)
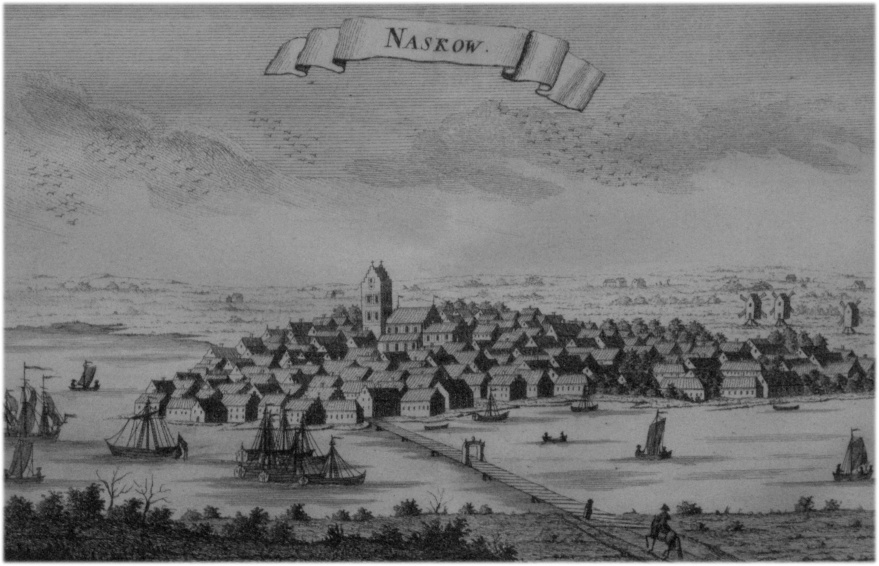
- Copper plate illustration of Nakskov from the 17th century. As seen from the south across the strait separating the inner and outer portions of the Fjord
Date	4 May – 15 July, 1659
Location	Nakskov, Lolland 54°50′00″N 11°09′00″E
Result	Swedish victory
Territorial changes	Nakskov is captured by Swedish forces

Belligerents
(yes) Swedish Empire	Denmark–Norway

Commanders and leaders
(yes) Carl Gustaf Wrangel (Note: Until 31 May) (yes) Gustaf Otto Stenbock (Note: From 31 May)	Joachim Kørber

Units involved
(yes) Garde du corps (yes) Life Guards (yes) von Schwerin's squadron	Nakskov garrison

Strength
2,000 men	1,255 men 43 guns

Casualties and losses
Heavy; 1 mortar destroyed	Heavy

The siege of Nakskov occurred from 4 May to 15 July 1659, during the Dano-Swedish War of 1658–1660. It began when an army of 2,000 men under Carl Gustaf Wrangel began blockading the roads leading into Nakskov. On 6 May, he would unsuccessfully attack towards Stubbeland and Färgeland after the garrison refused to surrender. Due to the failed attack, he instead began bombarding the city.

On 31 May, Gustaf Otto Stenbock took over the command for the Swedish forces after Wrangel had to leave to defend Funen. He eventually sent a new capitulation request on 6 July. When this was refused once again, the Swedes stormed the Stora Hornverket, swiftly capturing it and leaving only an old rampart between them and the city. Thus, the Danes soon accepted the capitulation terms, and they marched out with full military honours.

== Background ==
After the March Across the Belts in early 1658, the Danes were completely caught off guard by large Swedish forces marching on Copenhagen on the frozen Øresund straits. The Danish thus sued for peace by signing the unfavorable Treaty of Roskilde. However, not long after the treaty was signed, King Karl X of Sweden began to plan another war against Denmark. Karl X considered the Danish untrustworthy and suspected that Denmark would immediately declare war against Sweden if any of the other wars she was involved in turned in the enemy's favor. Furthermore, maintaining the Swedish army left in Denmark, due to the previous advance on the Danish capital, was unsustainable. Due to these factors, Karl X declared war on Denmark in August planning to again march on Copenhagen through the Danish Isles.

== Prelude ==
On 7 May 1659, Carl Gustaf Wrangel and 2,000 men landed on Falster, quickly occupying the entire island without any resistance. Soon, he landed on the nearby Lolland, meeting initial resistance from Joachim Kørber. These troops were rapidly repulsed, and Kørber soon withdrew into Nakskov.

== Siege ==
On 4 May, the Swedes blocked the roads into Nakskov. When Wrangel arrived to Arninge on the same day, he stationed the majority of his army there thus shutting off the southern roads into Nakskov. Additionally, smaller units were sent north and east to complete the encirclement. Garde du corps and the Life Guards were stationed at Fredsholm.

Nakskov's garrison consisted of around 1,255 men, of which 400 were infantry, 400 were armed burghers, 130 were Landsturm, 300 were cavalry, and 25 were artillerymen. The Danes stored their ammunition in a church, which was seen as a safe space to do so as damaging churches was avoided. Despite this, a Swedish grenade shot through the roof of the church without exploding on Sunday. Unlike the previous siege in 1658, the burghers wanted to fight, and the peasants inside were respected. Additionally, the defenses had been strengthened after the first siege.

Carl Gustaf Wrangel began by requesting Nakskov's capitulation, which was refused. Due to its refusal to surrender, Wrangel unsuccessfully launched an attack across Stubbeland and Färgeland on 6 May. Thus, he began bombarding the city instead to force a capitulation. On 9 May, in preparation to attack Stensö, the Swedes attacked Kuddeholm and Barneholm. These were captured, and on 14 May, the Swedes, specifically von Schwerin's squadron, attacked Stensö. The islands few defenders were most likely either killed or captured. The losses of the Swedes are describes as being only a "half-thumb".

Two days after Stensö's capture, two batteries were ready to begin bombarding Nakskov. Wrangel sent a new request for capitulation, but it was refused when Kørber heard that the anti-Swedish coalition was going to land on Lolland. For the rest of the month, Nakskov was continuously bombarded.

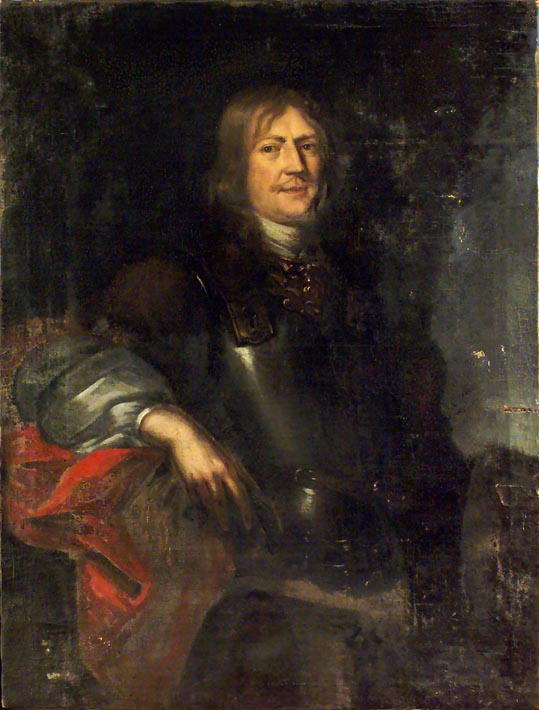
Portrait of Stenbock by David Klöcker Ehrenstrahl

On 24 May, Wrangel left the siege to defend Funen and Gustaf Otto Stenbock took over command of the siege on 31 May. Wrangels departure was due to Fredriksodde having fallen and thus Charles X Gustav sent Wrangel to defend the island from a possible landing. After arriving, Stenbock switched to a regular siege of the city and changed the main attack place from Markskov to the "Stora Hornverket". These changes likely happened on 3 June, when all the Swedish artillery and cavalry in exception to von Schwerin's squadron and the batteries on Stensö were moved to Markskov. Other units were sent to Säbyholm, Fredsholm, and Arninge. Stenbock continued bombarding Nakskov and moved the cannons the Swedes had captured to Markskov, where the Danish artillery had a harder time hitting the Swedes.

After regrouping, Swedish siege works began south of Markskov. By mid-June, the Swedes had come close to the ravelin in front of Stora Hornverket using trenches, batteries, and redoubts. After a few failed attempts, the Swedes were forced to start digging underneath a palisade in the dry moat of the ravelin due to the Danish bombardment. On 5 June, a skirmish occurred at Holleby, where Danish cavalry was forced to withdraw, suffering 10 casualties and having to leave behind cattle they were taking into the city.

During the siege, Nakskov's garrison did a total of 6 sorties, attacking the trench diggers. These sorties were repulsed with losses on both sides. On 6 July, the Swedes captured a outwork after some days of bombardment, and Stenbock began bombarding the Danish positions from inside the outwork. Now, Stenbock issued a new call for surrender, offering an "honorable" capitulation in which the Danish soldiers would be allowed to march out with muskets, two 6-pounder cannons and one 3-pounder. These troops would then be shipped to Kiel on a few Swedish ships. Any remaining defenders would be unharmed while any Landwehr troops would be conscripted into the Swedish army. Additionally, any peasants would be sent home to their farms.

The city burghers reacted negatively to the prospect of capitulation, instead wanting to defend against a storming attempt. Due to this, the Swedes stormed Stora Hornverket, thus only an old rampart separated them from Nakskov. Stenbock sent a new call for capitulation, which was accepted. Thus, the hopes of the burghers did not come to fruition. After signing the capitulation agreement on 15 July, Kørber and his men soon marched out with full military honours.

== Aftermath ==
According to the capitulation agreement, the Swedes would be awarded the church clocks in Nakskov Church. However, the burghers instead gave the Swedes 500 barrels of wheat instead of the clocks. The Swedes took much booty from Nakskov. This included large amounts of gunpowder and 14,800 musket balls, along with many cannons. The exact losses on both sides are unknown, but they were likely heavy.

The wider war would end in a Swedish defeat and the Danes managed to stall the Swedish offensive. Swedish forces had lacked supplies and their king Karl X died in 1659. Karl X's succeeded by his 4-year-old son. Without a strong King, the Swedish signed the Treaty of Copenhagen in 1660 returning many of the territories gained in the Treaty of Roskilde.

== Works cited ==
- Nordentoft, Johan (1937). "Nakskov og Svenskerne 1658 og 1659 III" [Nakskov and the Swedes 1658 and 1659]. krigsvidenskab.dk (in Danish).
- Isacson, Claes-Göran (2015). Karl X Gustavs krig: Fälttågen i Polen, Tyskland, Baltikum, Danmark och Sverige 1655-1660 [Wars of Charles X Gustav: The campaigns in Poland, Germany, the Baltics, Denmark and Sweden 1655-1660] (in Swedish). Historiska Media. ISBN 9789175450117.
- von Essen, Michael Fredholm (2023). The Danish Wars, 1657-1660. Charles X's Wars. Vol. 3. Helion & Company. ISBN 9781915113603.
- Barkman, Bertil C:son; Lundkvist, Sven; Tersmeden, Lars (1966). Kungl. Svea livgardes historia: 1632(1611)-1660 [History of the Royal Swedish Life Guards: 1632(1611)-1660] (in Swedish). Vol. 3:2. Stockholm: Stift. för Svea livgardes historia.
