= Siege of Kronborg =

Swedish siege of Kronborg

- Part of the Dano-Swedish War (1658–1660)
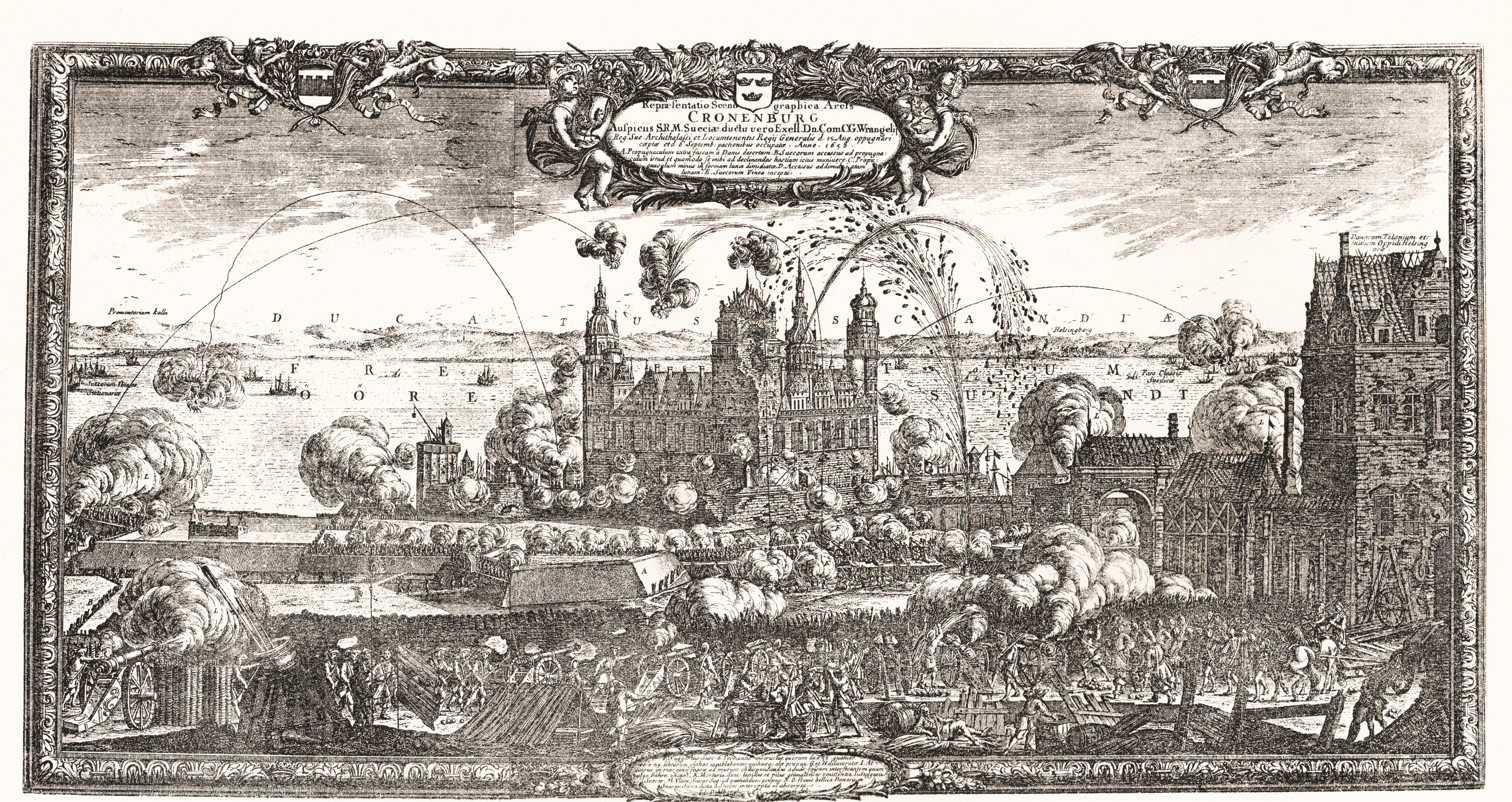
- Depiction of the siege by Erik Dahlbergh
| Date | 16 August – 6 September 1658 |
| Location | Helsingør, Denmark |
| Result | Swedish victory |
| Territorial changes | Kronborg is captured by Swedish forces |

Belligerents
| (yes) Swedish Empire | Denmark–Norway |

Commanders and leaders
| (Swedish Empire) Carl Gustaf Wrangel (Swedish Empire) Erik Dahlbergh (Swedish Empire) Eickstedt † | (Denmark–Norway) Poul Beenfeldt (Denmark–Norway) Carl Brunow |

Units involved
| Unknown | (Denmark–Norway) Kronborg garrison |

Strength
| 3,000 men | 400 men (Note: 350 of which were infantry, with the rest being archers and cavalry); 90 guns |

Casualties and losses
| 40 killed | 200 killed or wounded |

The siege of Kronborg (Danish: Belejringen af Kronborg; Swedish: Belägring av Kronborg) was a Swedish siege of the Danish stronghold Kronborg from 16 August to 6 September 1658, during the Dano-Swedish War of 1658–1660. The siege ended with a Swedish victory.

The Swedish besiegers, being led by Carl Gustaf Wrangel, successfully made the Danish commander surrender after spreading rumours that Copenhagen had fallen to the Swedes and convincing him that continued resistance was futile.

== Background ==
On 16 August, during the Siege of Copenhagen, King Charles X Gustav sent his most trusted man, Carl Gustaf Wrangel, to besiege Kronborg which was situated at the Øresund, referred to as "the Sound" in English.

== Siege ==
When Carl Gustaf Wrangels and his army of 3,000 men marched into Helsingør on the evening of 16 August, they were quickly bombarded with 24 and 36 pound cannonballs from the garrison in Kronborg. The Swedes also established a surveillance line. From a distance, conquering the fortress did not appear to be a difficult task for the Swedes. Kronborg was a large square Renaissance castle, with tall dome capped towers, turrets, stucco work, large windows, and tall chimneys, and was an "oversized garden pavilion" from afar, garrisoned by 400 men.

However, Kronborg was built with solid granite and had a double defensive ring, with the inner one having four bastions and a moat, also being stocked with large amounts of provisions, ammunition, and artillery, of which there were over 90 guns.

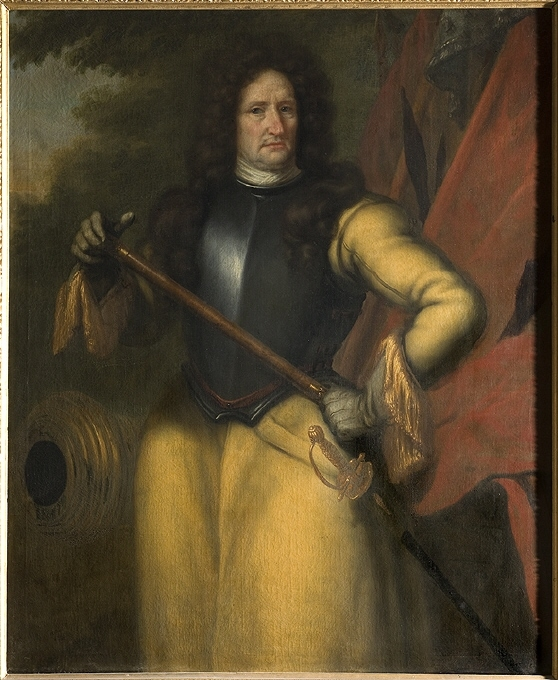
Portrait of Dahlbergh by David Klöcker Ehrenstrahl

In the beginning, Kronborg's defenders made it clear to the Swedes that they would not give up without a fight. Their guns fired projectiles in all directions. Some Danish guns fired towards the town, aiming to light it on fire, which failed. However, they did manage to cause some houses to light on fire. Others hit a ship loaded with cannons which the Swedes had recently captured, subsequently sinking. The Danes had also established a battery of falconets and hook guns on the square roof of the tower, which they could use to fire directly onto the Swedes who ran around to seek shelter in the surrounding buildings. The Danish commander, Poul Beenfeldt, had been ordered to blow the castle up rather than surrender.

Early in the morning of 18 August, the Danes attempted a sortie, but were forced back in with some losses. The Swedes advanced and captured the outer line of defenses.

Seeing the difficulty, a disgruntled Wrangel issued orders to initiate a formal siege. Heavy cannons and mortars from Malmö and Landskrona were sent to the besieging army. Wrangel's were ordered to dig in. Erik Dahlbergh led the construction of the Swedish batteries, while he also held responsibility for the siege works at Copenhagen.

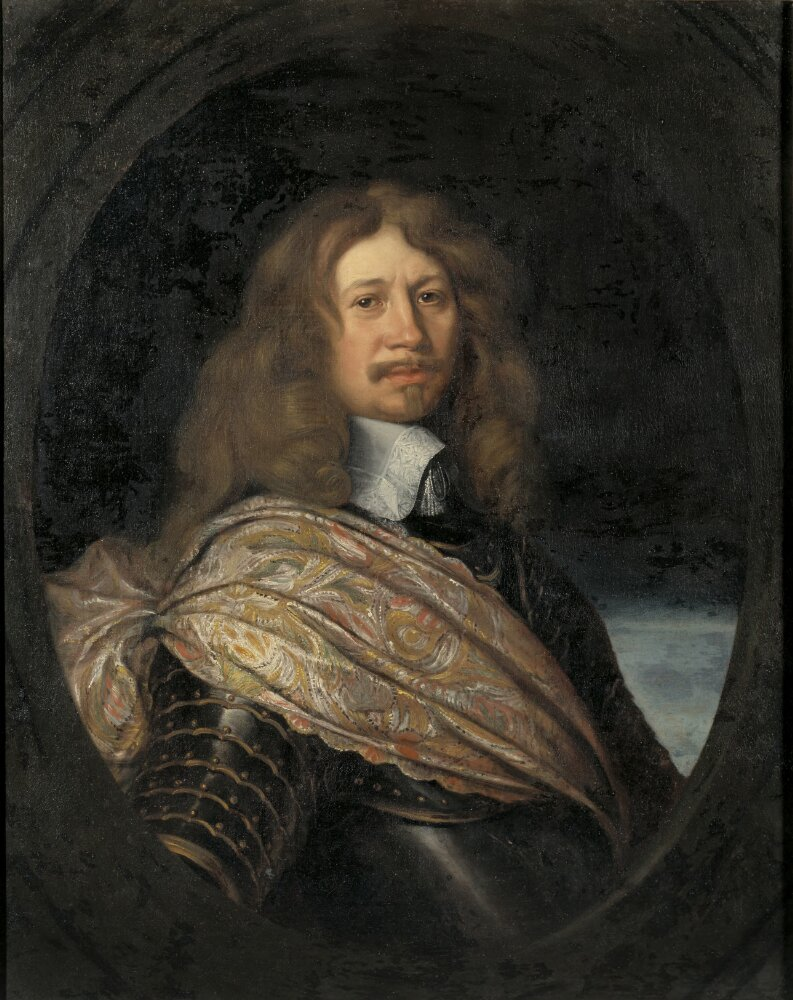
Portrait of Carl Gustaf Wrangel by Matthäus Merian the Younger, made in 1652

After just under a week, the Swedes had already gotten 20 heavy guns in place. They fired them both day and night using both round shot and fireworks. The defenders held their ground well, however, the fortress and the bastions were slowly being hammered to pieces, in some places brick by brick. In the early autumn, storms began sweeping in from the North Sea, drenching both the Swedes and Danes in rain, filling trenches and graves with water. By the end of August, the muddy and wet Swedish miners began digging under the moat's outer wall. On 5 September, the outer wall collapsed, leading to the casemates caving in and the bastions being torn apart. The main tower also began leaning.

Beenfeldt began losing his morale, along with his officers. Especially since Beenfeldt's wife had been imprisoned by the Swedes. He believed that the 400 men he had at his disposal were not enough to defend Kronborg. The Danes had so far been able to kill 40 Swedes, among them Lieutenant Colonel Eickstedt. In the beginning, the Danes had done what they could, but when many were wounded or killed by the Swedish artillery fire, their morale waned.

As the Swedes prepared, or pretended to prepare, for a storming of the castle, the Danes quickly capitulated on 6 September. The surrender message was given by Captain Gedde, who had conspired together with a certain Brunow against Beenfeldt and made him capitulate. Wrangel had employed a ruse as well. Spreading rumours that Copenhagen had fallen, Wrantel managed to convince Beenfeldt, the Danish commander, that the battle was already lost. About half had already been killed or wounded, and the remaining soldiers were on the brink of mutiny as they had not received their pay. When the storm bridge was brought down and the Danes came out, Dahlbergh was there, waiting with a few hundred men to quickly take control of Kronborg. He commented:

So, I was the first Swedish commander at Kronborg Castle.

— Erik Dahlbergh

== Aftermath ==
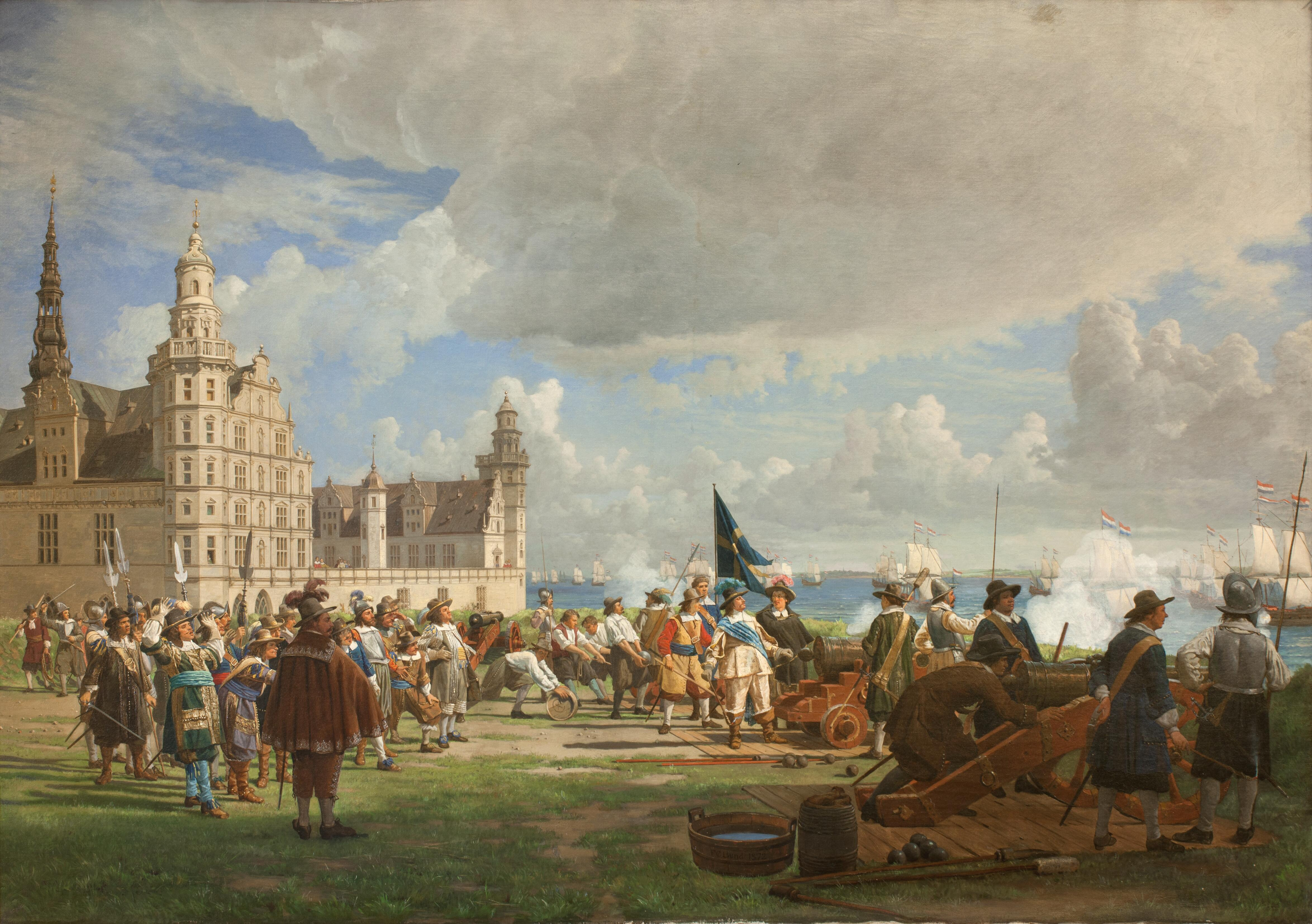
The Dutch fleet, led by admiral Obdam, enters the Sound and sails past Kronborg on October 29, 1658

The prolonged siege of Kronborg had cost the Swedes precious time, but the spoils taken were rich. The Swedes captured some 77–80 cannons. Among these cannons was the massive mortar Det Brandenburgska Lejonet. Besides all of the weapons, the Swedes took over 34 tons of gunpowder and some 1,000 barrels of provisions. The gate to the Sound was now effectively blocked, and Wrangel's forces were able to march back towards Copenhagen with heavy cannons, a welcome reinforcement for the main Swedish army which had rather weak artillery.

The fall of Kronborg was a serious defeat for the Danes. The Swedish occupation of the fortress could seriously hamper Dutch support in the Sound. However, when the Dutch fleet under Jacob van Wassenaer Obdam showed up, Kronborg proved of limited use. The Swedes were not able to halt the Dutch advance.

Kronborg henceforth became the residency for Charles X Gustav and Queen Hedvig Eleanora.

Both Beenfeldt and Brunow rode to Copenhagen, where they were both sentenced to death for cowardice and treason, but they were pardoned by Frederick III.

== See also ==
- Assault on Copenhagen (1659) – Part of the Second Northern War

== Works cited ==
- Englund, Peter (2000). Den oövervinnerlige: om den svenska stormaktstiden och en man i dess mitt [The invincible: about the era of Swedish great power and a man in its midst] (in Swedish). Atlantis. ISBN 9789174869996.
- Essen, Michael Fredholm von (2023). Charles X's Wars: Volume 3 - The Danish Wars, 1657-1660. Helion & Company. ISBN 9781915113603.
- Isacson, Claes-Göran (2015). Karl X Gustavs krig: Fälttågen i Polen, Tyskland, Baltikum, Danmark och Sverige 1655-1660 [Wars of Charles X Gustav: The campaigns in Poland, Germany, the Baltics, Denmark and Sweden 1655-1660] (in Swedish). Historiska Media. ISBN 9789175450117.
- Sundberg, Ulf (2010). Sveriges krig 1630-1814 [Sweden's wars 1630-1814] (in Swedish). Svenskt militärhistoriskt bibliotek. ISBN 9789185789634.
- Björlin, Gustaf (1889). Karl X Gustaf: Läsning för ung och gammal [Carl X Gustaf: Reading for young and old] (in Swedish). Looström & Komf's förlag.
- Veibull, Martin; Höjer, Magnus (1900). Sveriges historia från äldsta tid till våra dagar: Sverigesstorhetstid från år 1611 till år 1718 [Sweden's history from ancient times to the present day: Sweden's great era from the year 1611 to the year 1718] (in Swedish). Hjalmar Linnströms förlag.
