= Owen Coxe =

English Swedish Navy captain

Owen Coxe-Siölöw was an English captain in the Commonwealth navy who served in the Royal Swedish Navy 1658–1660, reaching vice-admiral's rank and being ennobled by the Swedish crown under the name Siölöw.

During the Dano-Swedish War 1658–60, the Dutch navy aided the Danes, and a large English fleet under Montagu was sent to the Baltic during the summer of 1659 in order to counterbalance the Dutch presence. The English also sent Sir George Ayscue, thirteen captains, of whom also were Coxe, 14 lieutenants, and about 300 seamen, who were to enter directly into Swedish service.

In the Battle of Ebeltoft in 1659, Coxe-Siölöw, commanding a Swedish squadron of seven ships, successfully attacked five Danish and Dutch ships protecting a convoy of 40 coastal vessels, taking four of the ships, and burning one, as well as all the merchant vessels, capturing 1,000 prisoners of war. Shortly thereafter he attacked the port of Århus, destroying another 30 smaller vessels. Back in Swedish port, Coxe-Siölöw was promoted from major to amirallöjtnant.
