= Battle of Nyborg =

Battle in the Second Northern War

Coordinates: 55.2700°N 10.8700°E

- Part of the Dano-Swedish War (1658–1660)
- Battle of Nyborg depicted by Willem Swidde
Date	14 November 1659
Location	Nyborg, Denmark
Result	Allied victory

Belligerents
(yes) Swedish Empire	Denmark-Norway; Brandenburg-Prussia; Polish–Lithuanian Commonwealth; Dutch Republic

Commanders and leaders
(Swedish Empire) Philip Florinus of Sulzbach (Swedish Empire) Gustaf Otto Stenbock	(Denmark–Norway) Hans Schack (Holy Roman Empire) Ernst Albrecht von Eberstein (Polish–Lithuanian Commonwealth) Stefan Czarniecki (Dutch Republic) Michiel de Ruyter

Strength
5,000–7,000	9,000–11,200

Casualties and losses
2,000 killed	1,900 killed and wounded

The Battle of Nyborg took place between Sweden and the combined forces of Denmark, Dutch naval forces under Michiel de Ruyter, troops of Brandenburg-Prussia, and Polish–Lithuanian Commonwealth forces under Stefan Czarniecki. The battle was engaged on 14 November 1659 at Nyborg on the Danish island of Funen. Nyborg was the final major battle of the Dano-Swedish War of 1658 to 1660.

Swedish Imperial field marshal Philip Florinus of Sulzbach, leading the vanquished Swedish forces, was forced to save his own life by fleeing under cover of night. The battle is considered one of the most important Danish victories of the war.

== Background ==
After the disastrous Assault on Copenhagen, Charles X Gustav divided his army into bigger parts to move over to Funen, in order to rest and replenish. In Copenhagen it was decided that in September, the next decisive battle would take place on Funen under the command of the Dano-German commander and Field Marshal Hans Schack. Schack's force would move from Copenhagen and Schleswig to Funen, while another force under the command of Saxon field marshal Ernst Albrecht von Eberstein would move up through Jutland. In Eckernförde on 20 October, Schack and Eberstein agreed that they would land at Funen around 1 November. On Funen, Nyborg was the only important fortification for the Swedes. However it was not in a good condition, and the Swedes began working to improve its defenses.

== Prelude ==
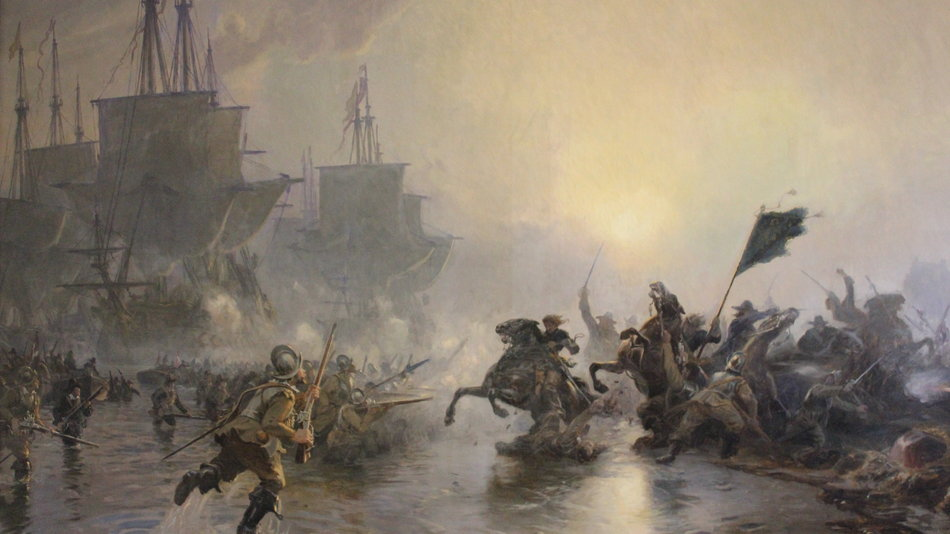
The allied landing at Kerteminde on Funen, by Christian Mølsted

Schack attempted first on 28 October to initiate a direct landing at Nyborg. However it failed, due to bad weather. Instead he completed a landing at Kerteminde with his troops three days later. In the meantime, Eberstein was still moving his troops through Jutland, and on 4 November he moved over the Little Belt between Frederiksodde (now Fredericia) and Middelfart. During the crossing, small boats were used to get to Funen, and it took 5 days to land all of Eberstein's troops on the island. The Swedes had a chance to defeat the two allied forces before they could unite, but this opportunity was not used due to the hesitation of the commander of the Swedish forces Philip Florinus of Sulzbach, who had pulled back to Nyborg. This did not please Charles X Gustav who sent Gustav Otto Stenbock to relieve him of his command. But when he arrived at Nyborg, its defenses were not as great as the Swedes had anticipated. Stenbock sent a letter to the king, informing him that defending the city would be in vain.

Eberstein suggested that a war council would be held, but this was denied by Schack. There were disputes between the two commanders regarding the command of the allied forces. The two eventually decided to lead their own troops, and would switch the main command of the forces with each other in the coming days. The Swedes under the command of Sulzbach knew of the allied movement, and decided to engage the allied forces near the city.

== Battle ==
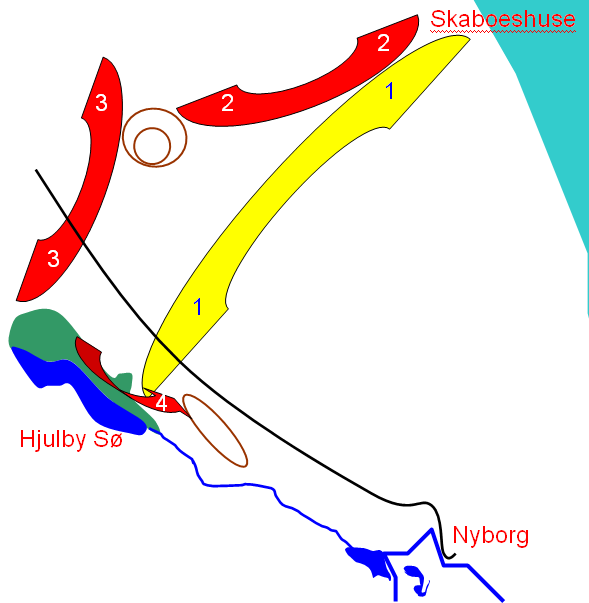
The Battle at Nyborg, November 14, 1659. Dislocation prior to the battle 1) Swedish forces 2) Danish (international) forces led by Eberstein and 3) Danish forces led by Schack. 4) Cavalry-strike by Ahlefeldt

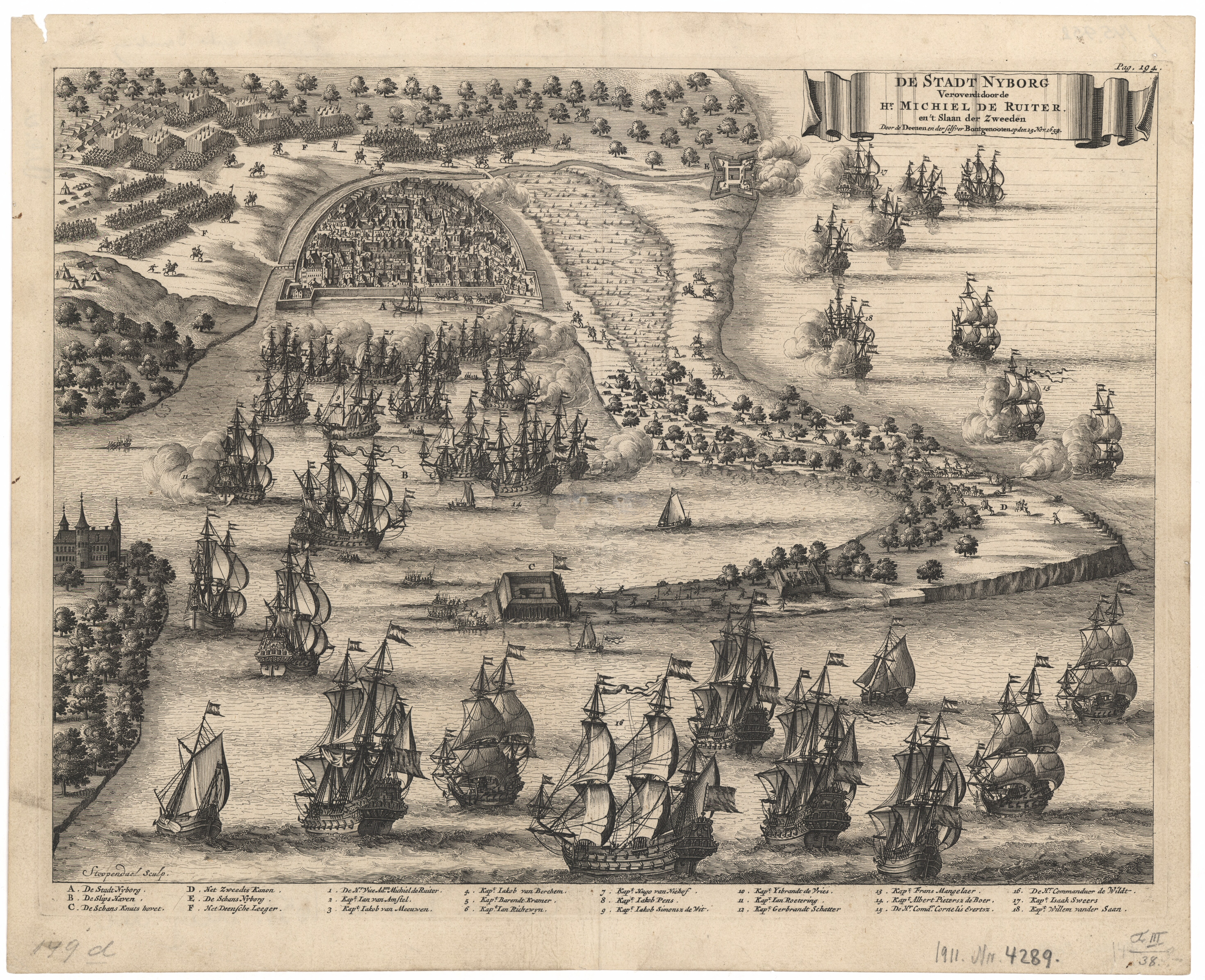
The city of Nyborg captured by the lord Michiel de Ruyter and the beating of the Swedes by the Danes and the Allies on 25 November 1659

Early in the morning of 14 November, Eberstein reached the Swedes 3-4 km northwest from Nyborg. Sulzbach had positioned his forces between the Hjulby Sø, a small lake on his left flank and a big forest on the right near the hamlet of Skaboshuse. Sulzbach would use the forest as cover, if retreating was necessary. For the allies, it was agreed that Eberstein would lead the northern left flank, while Schack would lead the southern right. The Swedes had a force of 5,000 experienced but battle-weary men against the allied combined force of 9,000. The allied force was divided into two, and consisted mostly of Danish troops, but also Prussian and Polish troops, led by famed Polish general and nobleman Stefan Czarniecki.

At 11 a.m the battle began. Schack saw the manoeuvre of Eberstein and went into a similar battle formation. Before Schack could advance, Eberstein launched three attacks against the Swedes, but they were repelled. Sulzbach ordered a cavalry counterattack against Eberstein’s flank. Eberstein himself was almost captured but managed to escape. Schack saw the importance of preventing Eberstein’s forces from breaking, and mounted an attack on the Swedish left flank and center.

Unbeknownst to the Swedes, allied Lieutenant General Hans Ahlefeldt had intended to move through the Hjulby Sø with his cavalry, and attack the Swedish left flank from there. He reached the lake and began the crossing. Once it was done, he ordered the cavalry to charge. This caught the Swedes off guard, and caused them to retreat back to Nyborg. During the retreat, many of the fleeing Swedes were cut down by the allied cavalry.

On 15 November the allies had reached Nyborg, where they began bombarding the city with artillery. After a Dutch naval landing by Michiel de Ruyter, the remaining 3,000 Swedish troops had no choice but to surrender. The battle had lasted for 5 hours.

== Aftermath ==
The Swedish king Charles X Gustav, witnessed the battle from Korsør. After he admitted defeat, he returned to Sweden. It became the last major battle of the war. Whether this battle or the Assault on Copenhagen was a turning point for the Danes, is discussed between historians. After the battle, the Swedes had not enough men to be to able to win another major battle.

== See also ==
- 1659 in Denmark

== Sources ==
- Bruijn, J. R. (2011). De Ruyter: Dutch Admiral. Rotterdam: Karwansaray. ISBN 978-9-49025-8030.
- Tersmeden, Lars (1964). Aktuellt och historiskt : Karl X Gustav, pfalzgreven Filip av Sulzbach och slaget om Fyn 1659. Malmö: Beyronds A.B. OCLC 1089945445.
- Rockstroh, Knud Christian (17 July 2011), Hans Ahlefeldt (officer), Dansk biografisk leksikon
