= Philip Florinus of Sulzbach =

Austrian field marshal (1630–1703)

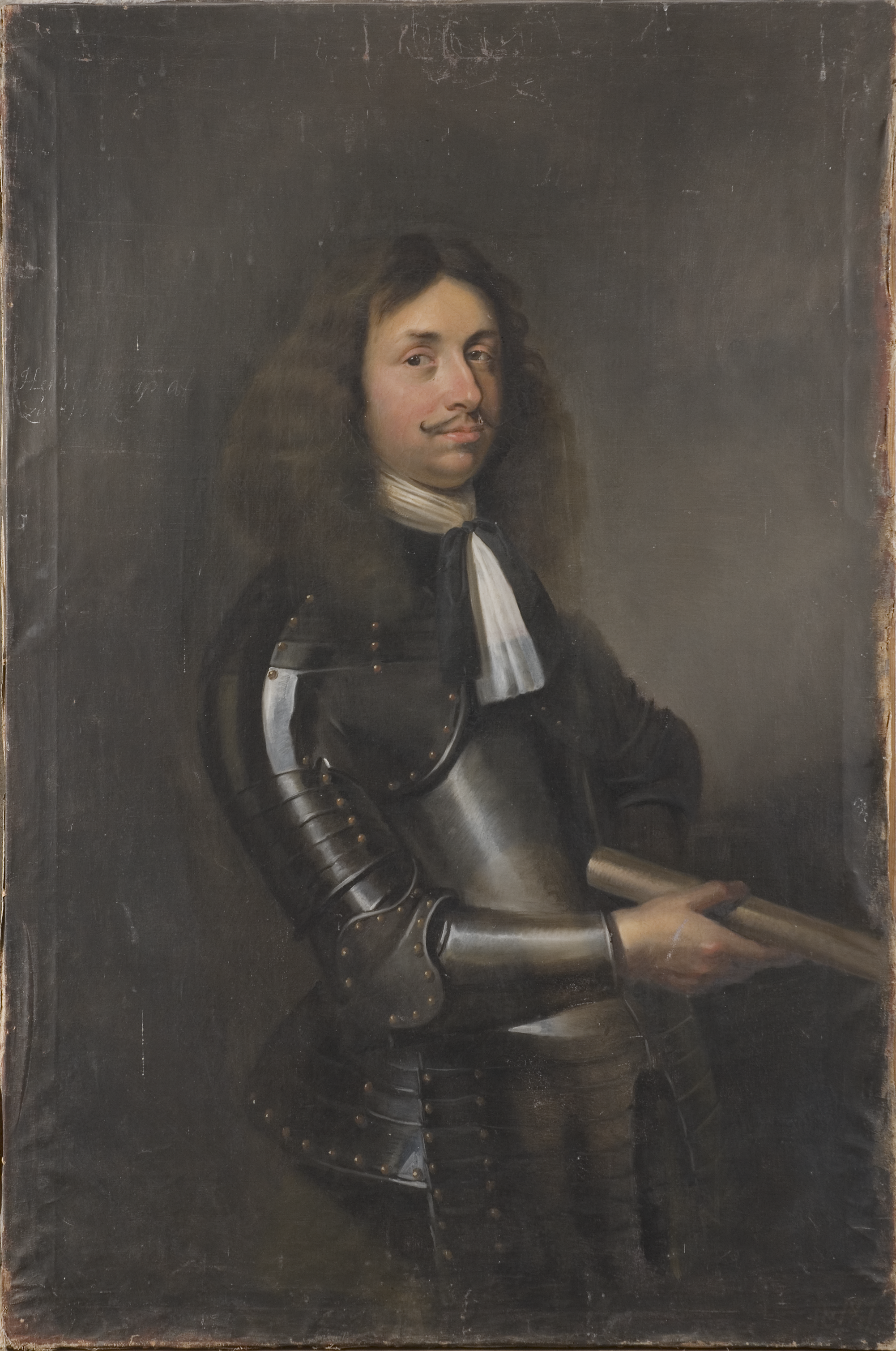
Philip Florinus of Pfalz-Sulzbach (1630–1703)

Philip Florinus of Pfalz-Sulzbach (Sulzbach, 20 January 1630 – Nürnberg, 4 April 1703) was an imperial field marshal.

== Life ==
Philip was the youngest son of Augustus, Count Palatine of Sulzbach (1582–1632) and Hedwig of Schleswig-Holstein-Gottorf (1603–1657).

He began his military career in the army of the Duchy of Lorraine. Then he joined the Swedish army and fought under King Charles X Gustav of Sweden against Prussia, and later in the Dano-Swedish War (1658–1660), where he lost the disastrous Battle of Nyborg on Fünen and had to save his own life by fleeing at night. After the death of the Swedish King, he went to Venice where he participated in the Cretan War (1645–1669) against the Ottomans. But he left Venice again in 1662 after internal struggles and now entered in the service of the Habsburg Emperor. He played an important role as Field Marshal and overall commander of the Cavalry in the successful Battle of Saint Gotthard (1664).

After this, he fought for France, again Sweden and finally for Bavaria, where he died in 1703.

== Literature ==
- August B. Michaelis, Julius Wilhelm Hamberge: Einleitung zu einer vollständigen Geschichte der Chur- und Fürstlichen Häuser, Bd. 2. Buchhandlung Meyer, Lemgo 1760, S. 121.
