= Gustaf Otto Stenbock =

Swedish military officer and politician (1614–1685)

Gustaf Otto Gustafsson Stenbock
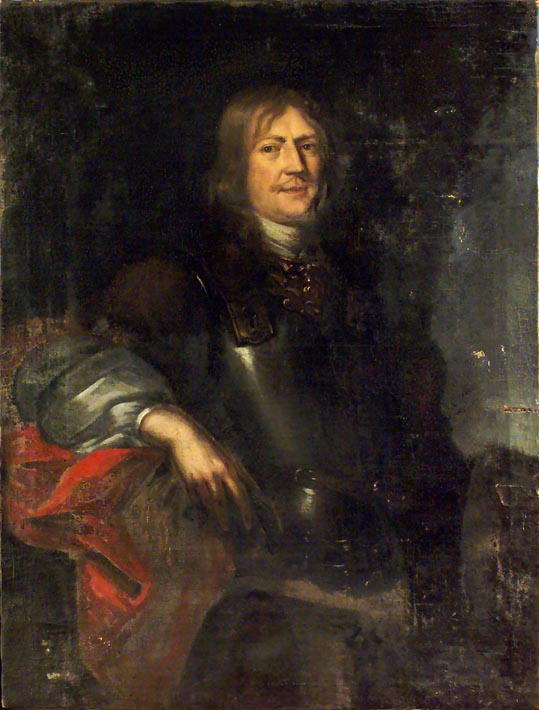
- Painting of Gustaf Otto Stenbock
- Born: 17 September 1614; Torpa stenhus, Sweden
- Died: 24 September 1685 (aged 71); Stockholm, Sweden
- Spouse(s): Baroness Brita Horn of Åminne (m. 1645–1658), Christina Catharina De la Gardie (m. 1658)
- Children: Count Gustaf Stenbock, Beata Stenbock, Sigrid Stenbock, Christina Katharina Stenbock, Magdalena Katharina Stenbock, Count Carl Otto Stenbock, Brigitta Stenbock, Beata Margareta Stenbock, Count Erik Gustaf Stenbock, Count Jakob Stenbock, Count Magnus Stenbock, Hedvig Eleonora Stenbock, Charlotta Maria Stenbock
- Military career
- Allegiance: Sweden
- Army: Swedish Army
- Service years: 1631–1685
- Rank: General Field Marshal
- Units: Småland Cavalry Regiment, Kronoberg Regiment, Jönköping Regiment
- Commands: Governor General of Skåne, Lord High Admiral of Sweden
- Known for: Military service, Governor, Lord High Admiral
- Conflicts: Thirty Years' War; Battle of Nördlingen, Second Battle of Breitenfeld; Dano-Swedish War (1658–1660); Assault on Copenhagen (1659); Siege of Nakskov (1659); Landing at Ystad (1659); Battle of Nyborg; Scanian War; Siege of Bohus fortress

Gustaf Otto Gustafsson Stenbock (17 September 1614, Torpa stenhus – 24 September 1685, Stockholm) was a Swedish military officer and politician.

== Biography ==
He was a member of the noble Stenbock family; born to the Riksråd (Privy Councilor) Gustav Stenbock and his wife, Countess Beata Margareta née Brahe (1583–1645). He was therefore related to the royal family on his father's side.

In 1631, he joined the Småland Cavalry Regiment. From 1633, he fought in Germany, during the Thirty Years' War, and took part in the Battle of Nördlingen, among others. He won promotions to Commander of the Kronoberg Regiment (1637), and Colonel of the Jönköping Regiment (1639). He was seriously wounded at the Second Battle of Breitenfeld in 1642, and returned home. He continued to pursue a miltitary career, however, participating in several campaigns and being promoted to Major General (1643), Lieutenant General (1647) and General of the Infantry (1648). Following the brief war between Sweden and Bremen (1654), he was promoted to Field Marshal. During the Second Northern War, he received a final promotion to General Field Marshal. During Sweden's second war against Denmark, he successfully repulsed a Danish landing in Ystad in 1659. He also successfully besieged Nakskov earlier in the same year.

Following the Treaty of Roskilde (1658), he received his first civilian appointment, as Governor General of the newly annexed provinces of Schonen, Halland und Blekinge; acquired from Denmark. In 1664, this led to another military appointment, as Lord High Admiral of Sweden, although he had never served in the Navy and had no seafaring experience. It was generally believed to be compensation for being passed over for Marshal of the Realm. During the Scanian War, the Swedish navy suffered devastating losses. In 1676, Stenbock and two other inexperienced Admirals were held accountable. He was deposed and the office abolished. He was also fined 200,000 Thalers.

A year later, he was rehabilitated by King Charles XI, and his fine was reduced to 100,000 Thalers. He was also allowed to command a campaign against Norway, during which he was able to lift the Siege of Bohus fortress. In 1680, after the end of the Scanian War, he was given permission to call himself "Supreme Admiral", although he had no authority. His last few years were marred by illness and poverty.

== Family ==
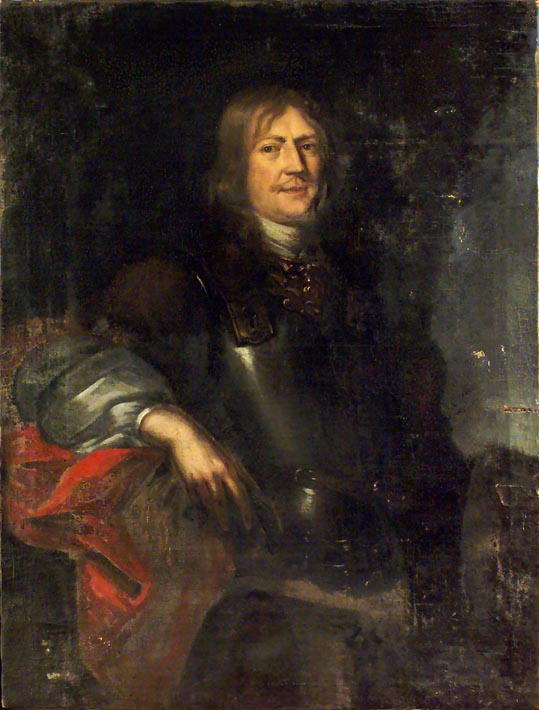
Portrait of Stenbock by David Klöcker Ehrenstrahl

He was married twice. His first wife was Baroness Brita Horn of Åminne (died 1658). They were wed on 22 July 1645.

Children

- Count Gustaf Stenbock (1646–1672)
- Beata Stenbock (died 1648)
- Sigrid Stenbock (died 1648)
- Christina Katharina Stenbock (1649–1719), married Swedish statesman and Governor-General of Estonia Anders Torstenson.
- Magdalena Katharina Stenbock (1652–1676), married Gustaf Mauritz Lewenhaupt (1651–1700), son of Gustaf Adolf Lewenhaupt
- Count Carl Otto Stenbock (1653–1697), married baroness Margareta Soop of Limingo

On 1 June 1658, he married the Gothenburg countess Christina Catharina De la Gardie (1632–1704); daughter of Field Marshal and Count Jakob De la Gardie (1583–1652) and Countess Ebba Brahe (1596–1674). He also bought one of the largest estates in the Baltic area: Kolga manor in Kuusalu Parish, Estonia; from the De la Gardie family. It had an area of 500 km^{2}.

Children

- Brigitta Stenbock (1660–1682)
- Beata Margareta Stenbock (1661–1735), married count Gustaf Douglas (1648–1705)
- Count Erik Gustaf Stenbock (1662–1722), married Countess Johanna Eleonora De la Gardie (1661–1708)
- Count Jakob Stenbock
- Count Magnus Stenbock (1665–1717), Swedish military officer, married Eva Magdalena Oxenstierna (1671-1722)
- Hedvig Eleonora Stenbock (1664–1729), married Freiherr Lorentz Creutz the Younger (1646–1698).
- Charlotta Maria Stenbock (1667–1740), married count Axel Johan Lewenhaupt (1660–1717).

== Works cited ==
- Bonnesen, Sten (1924). Karl X Gustav [Charles X Gustav] (in Swedish). Gleerups.
- Barkman, Bertil C:son; Lundkvist, Sven; Tersmeden, Lars (1966). Kungl. Svea livgardes historia: 1632(1611)-1660 [History of the Royal Swedish Life Guards: 1632(1611)-1660] (in Swedish). Vol. 3:2. Stockholm: Stift. för Svea livgardes historia.
