= Dano-Swedish War (1658–1660) =

War between Denmark–Norway and Sweden that took place between 1658-60

- Part of the Second Northern War and a series of Dano-Swedish wars
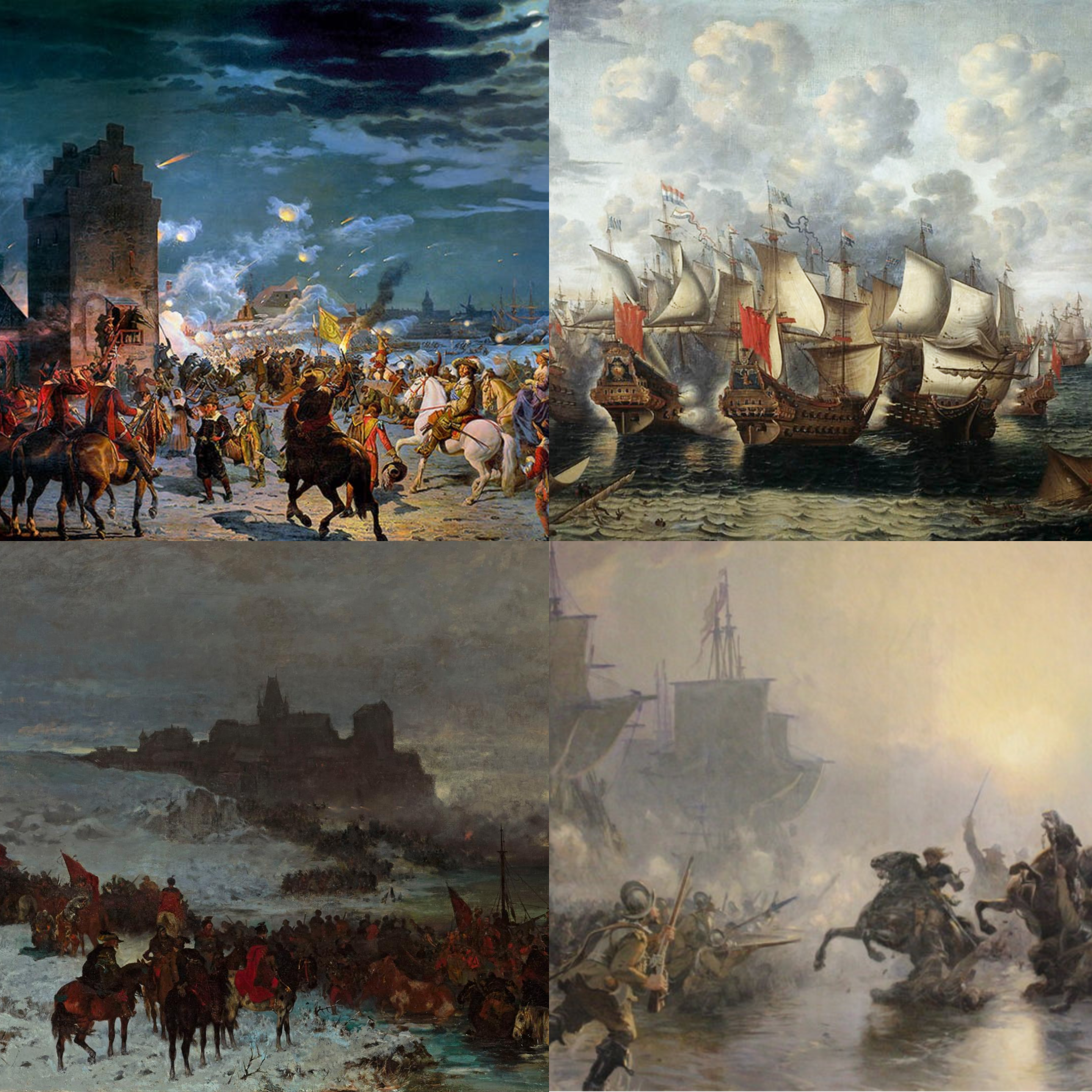
- Clockwise, from top left: Assault on Copenhagen (11 February 1659); Battle of the Sound (29 October 1658); Siege of Kolding (23 – 25 December 1658); Battle of Nyborg (14 November 1659)
Date	August 5, 1658 – May 26, 1660
Location	Denmark–Norway (Jutland, Zealand, Funen, Trøndelag, Romsdal and Bornholm)
Result	Dano-Norwegian victory; Treaty of Copenhagen
Territorial changes	Bornholm and Trøndelag returned to Denmark-Norway.; Swedish Gold Coast formally returned to Sweden.; Swedish sovereignty accepted on Ven.

Belligerents
(yes) Swedish Empire	Denmark–Norway; Dutch Republic (Margraviate of Brandenburg) Brandenburg-Prussia; Poland–Lithuania; Habsburg Monarchy

Commanders and leaders
(Swedish Empire) Charles X Gustav (Swedish Empire) Carl Gustaf Wrangel (Swedish Empire) Gustaf Otto Stenbock (Swedish Empire) Lars Kagg (Swedish Empire) Philip of Sulzback (Swedish Empire) Harald Stake (Swedish Empire) Fabian von Fersen	(Denmark–Norway) Frederick III (Denmark–Norway) Hans Schack (Denmark–Norway) Jørgen Bjelke (Denmark–Norway) Tønne Huitfeldt (Dutch Republic) Jacob van Obdam (Dutch Republic) Michiel de Ruyter (Dutch Republic) Witte de With † (Polish–Lithuanian Commonwealth) Stefan Czarniecki (Holy Roman Empire) Ernst Albrecht von Eberstein (Holy Roman Empire) Raimondo Montecuccoli

The Dano-Swedish War of 1658–1660 was a war between Denmark–Norway and Sweden, with the former backed by the Dutch Republic and Poland. It is known in Denmark as the Second Karl Gustav War (Danish: Anden Karl Gustav-krig), in Norway as Bjelkes Feud (Norwegian: Bjelkefeiden) in Sweden as Karl Gustav's Second Danish War (Swedish: Karl Gustavs andra danska krig), and in the Netherlands as the Swedish-Dutch War (Dutch: Zweeds-Nederlandse Oorlog).

It was a continuation of an earlier conflict between the two belligerents which had ended just months earlier, after Sweden and Denmark brokered a peace agreement in Roskilde in 1658. In the aftermath of that conflict, the Swedish king Charles X Gustav desired to add the province of Royal Prussia in Poland to the Swedish realm, but his position in the region was not strong enough with the opposition of Brandenburg and Austria. However, the Danes stalled and prolonged the fulfillment of some provisions of the earlier peace; the Swedish king decided to use this as a pretext to attack with an ambitious goal: to vanquish Denmark as a sovereign state and raze the capital of Copenhagen. A quick and decisive defeat of Denmark was however only seen as a means to a greater end. The long-term goal was to wage war in Europe without fearing Danish interference.

The Swedish army surrounded Copenhagen, hoping to starve it into submission. This failed when the Dutch Republic joined the conflict on the Danish side and a reinforcing fleet managed to smash its way through the Swedish naval forces in Øresund. Charles then tried a decisive assault on the city, hoping to conquer it and win the war; this plan likewise failed. Brandenburg, Poland and Austria then also joined the war against the Swedes.

Charles X fell ill in early 1660 and died in February of that year. With the death of the Swedish king, one of the major obstacles to peace was gone and the Treaty of Oliva was signed with the Allies (Poland, Austria and Brandenburg). However, the Danes were not keen on peace after their recent successes and witnessing the weakness of the Swedish efforts. The Dutch retracted their blockade, but were soon convinced by the Danes to support them again. The French and English intervened for the Swedish and the situation was again teetering on the edge of a major conflict. However, the Danish statesman Hannibal Sehested negotiated a peace treaty without any direct involvement by foreign powers and the conflict was resolved with the Treaty of Copenhagen, where Sweden was forced to return Bornholm to Denmark and Trøndelag to Norway. The treaty of 1660 established political borders between Denmark, Sweden and Norway which have lasted to the present day.

== Background ==
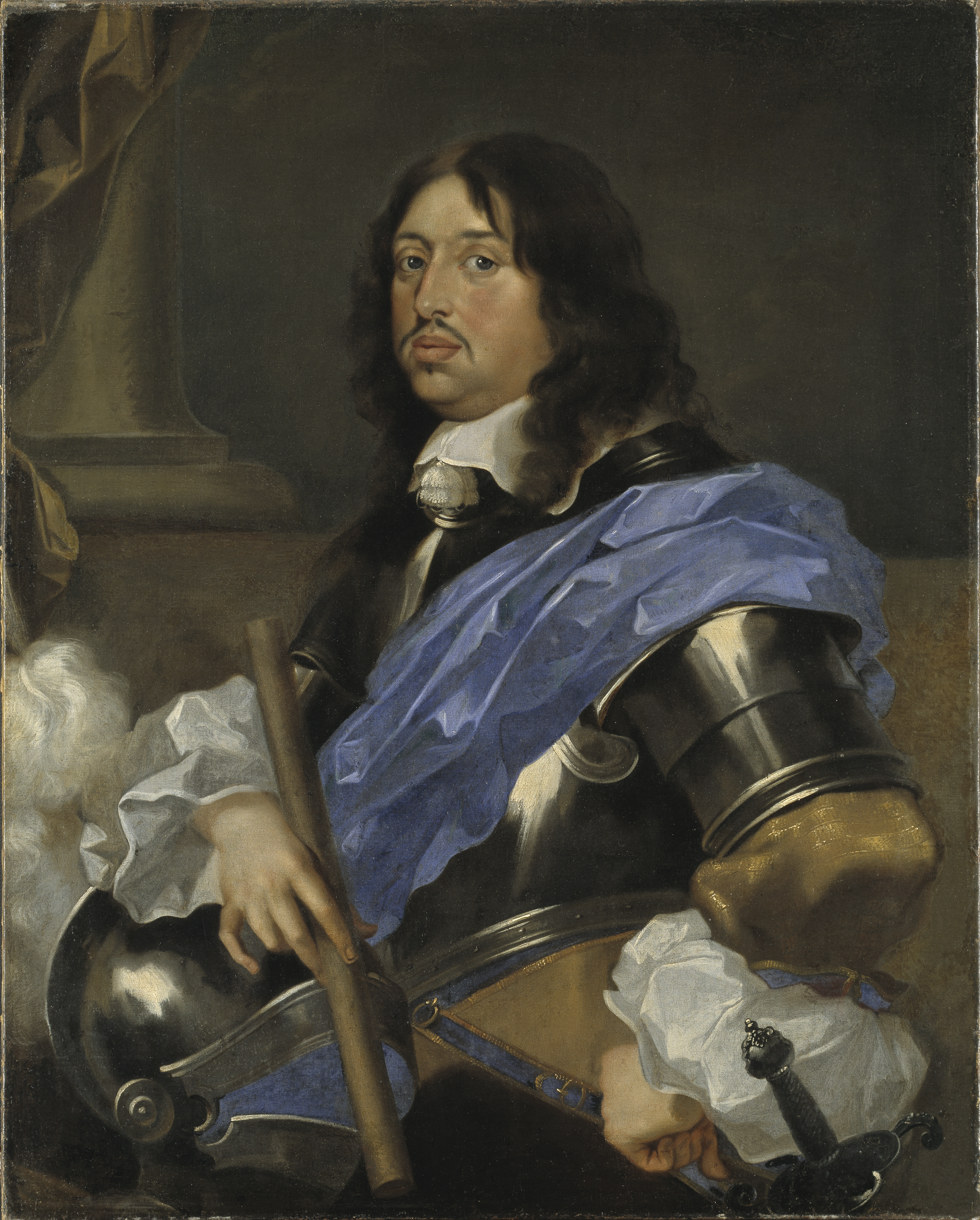
Charles X Gustav of Sweden (1652–1653) by Sébastien Bourdon.

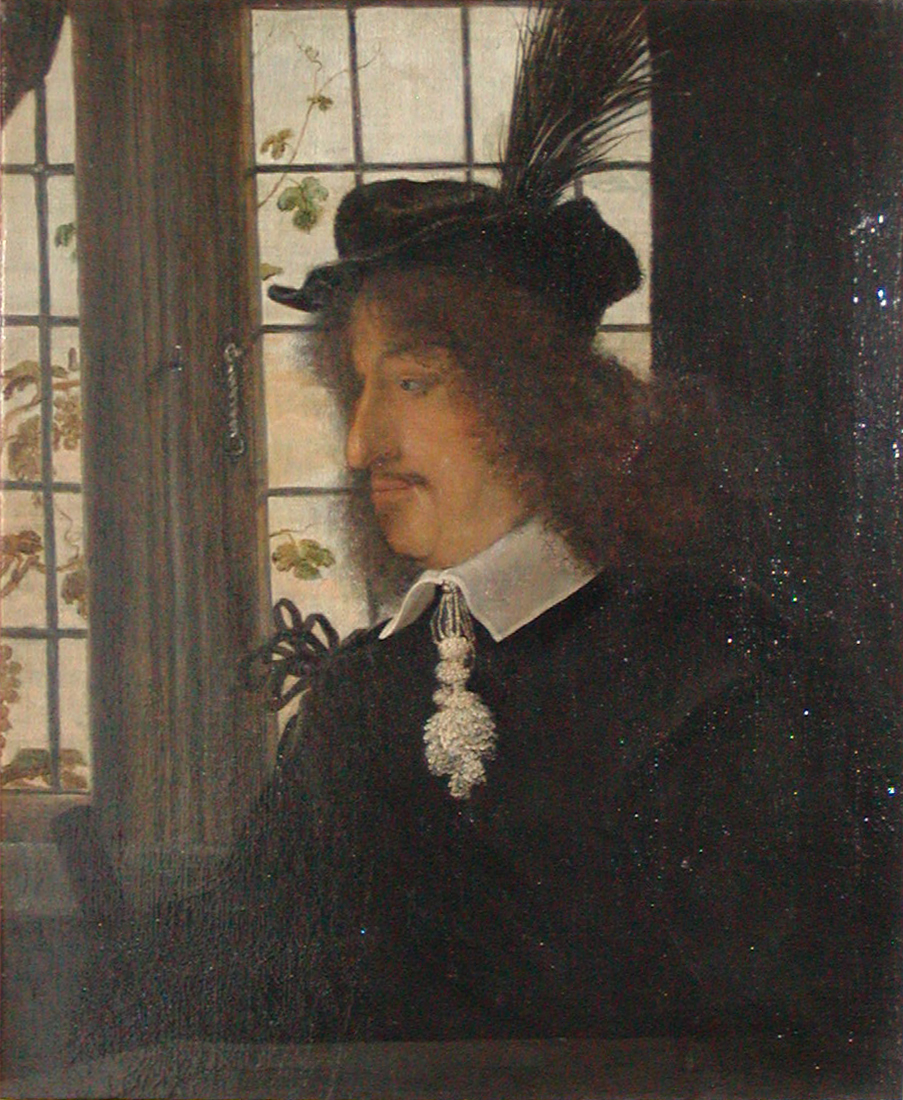
Frederick III of Denmark.

Charles X of Sweden had concluded the earlier war with Denmark with a stunning victory by succeeding in the bold March across the Belts. Denmark-Norway had been forced into a humiliating peace in the Treaty of Roskilde in which Denmark had to cede Scania, Halland and Blekinge on the Scandinavian Peninsula and the island of Bornholm, and Norway lost the provinces of Båhuslen and Trøndelag. Europe was stunned by the quick victory, and Charles proudly publicized his accomplishments. However, peace meant new problems. In the peace treaty of Roskilde, Denmark was obliged to supply the Swedish army with provisions until May 1658, but soon thereafter the army would need to be moved. The Swedish king knew that the army would not be able to be supplied in Sweden for long, and disbanding it was not desirable with the Poles eager to revenge the 1655 invasion of Poland-Lithuania. Sweden was not in want of enemies to attack: campaigns in Livonia and Estonia were considered, but were rejected due to supply problems. The Swedish King maintained that his main goal was to invade Royal Prussia, but he also wanted to punish Frederick William of Brandenburg-Prussia. The many enemies in continental Europe, among them Poland and a hostile Dutch would make this a difficult endeavor however. A new attack on Prussia would also see little international support, France was already urging peace. The surprising Swedish solution to this dilemma would be to return to Denmark in an attempt to finish the job.

When the Danish stalled and prolonged the fulfillment of some provisions of the earlier peace treaty the Swedish king decided to use this as a pretext to attack with a breathtaking goal: to vanquish Denmark as a sovereign state, raze the capital of Copenhagen and divide the country into four administrative regions. This would allow Sweden to control the Baltic Sea and bring in large customs revenues. However, even this ambitious goal was just to be stepping stone towards the ultimate plan of a quick conquest of Denmark so that the Swedes could wage a campaign in Europe without risking Danish interference.

== Events ==
In June 1658 it was decided that the Swedish forces would attack. On August 6, 1658 a fleet of 70 ships with 5,700 men and 18 pieces of light artillery embarked upon a journey to Denmark. Since the previous war, Jutland was still occupied by Swedish troops and there were troops on Fyn. In addition to this, Field Marshal Gustav Otto Stenbock had assembled reinforcements in Scania in Southern Sweden. The plan was for the Swedish army to march on Copenhagen.

=== Siege of Copenhagen ===
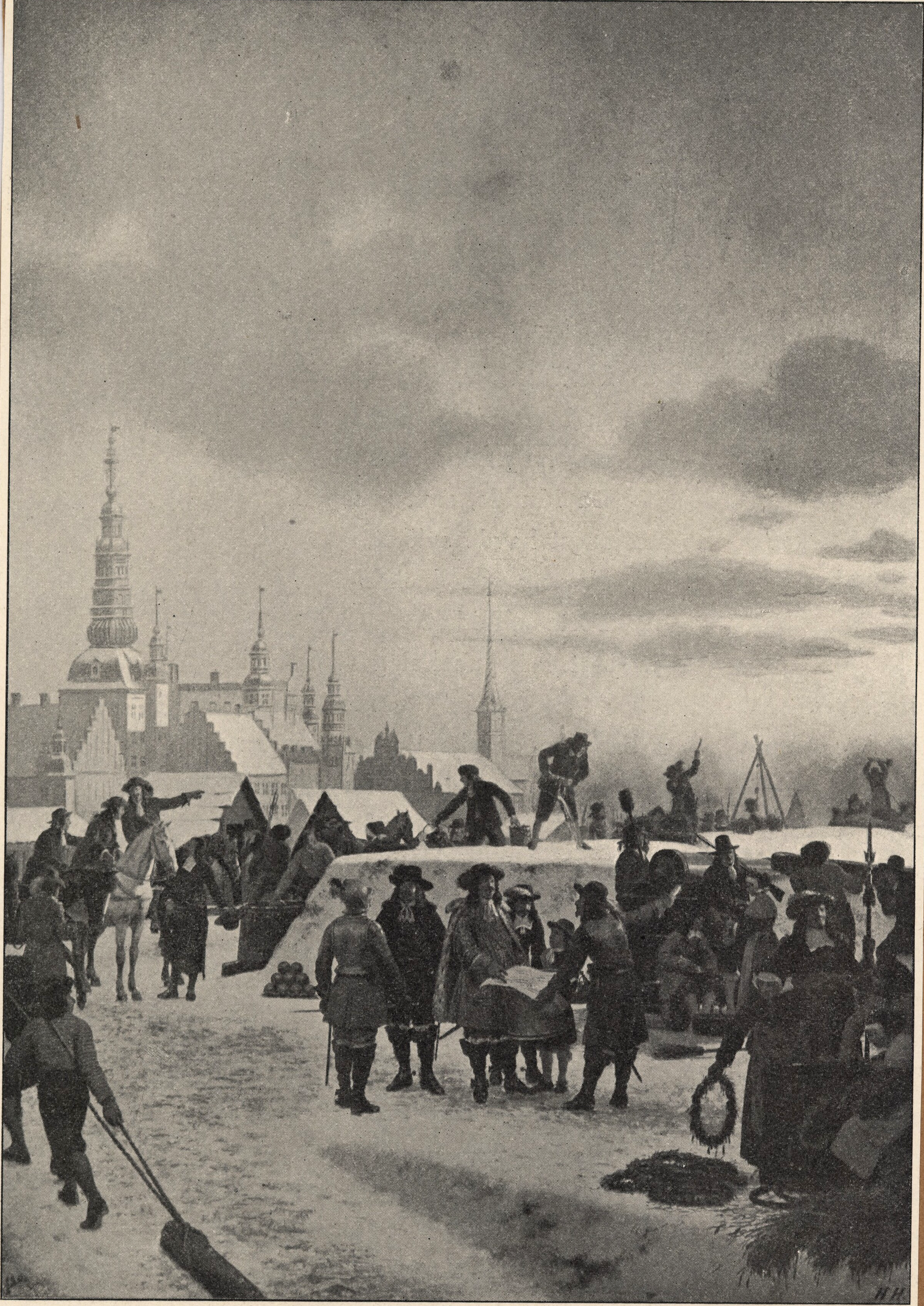
The Danes prepare the defences of Copenhagen. Painting by Heinrich Hansen.

On August 11, 1658 Charles X and his forces reached Valby hill (current day Frederiksberg) from where they could overlook the Danish capital. His arrival was expected and Danish King Frederick III had already ordered every building outside the city walls burnt, even though it had housed a third of the population of the city. That same day the city gates were closed and would not open again for another 22 months. A Swedish fleet of 28 ships blocked the harbor, preventing resupply by sea. The siege had begun.

When the Swedish king arrived to find half the city in flames and the Danes willing to put up a fight he had a difficult decision to make, whether to press forward immediately or whether to lay siege on the city and try to starve it out. His advisers were divided on the issue, and the king ultimately decided on the latter route. The wisdom of this decision has been questioned, since the Danish defenses were in poor shape initially. However, the population of Copenhagen rallied behind Frederick III, and the walls, moats and other defensive structures of the city were quickly improved. A large number of cannons were brought into the city from ships anchored in the harbor and placed along likely attack routes. The city also had plenty of defensive materiel: 50 tonnes (110,000 lb) of lead, 4,000 muskets, and a staggering 810 kilometres (500 mi) of slow match.

The Swedish siege force consisted of 11 brigades and 16 squadrons comprising 4,000 infantry, 2,000 cavalry and 50 cannons. The Swedes took the outer defensive perimeter, built in 1625 by Christian IV, which had fallen into disrepair. It was hastily repaired and artillery was brought to bear on the city. The Danes would not let the Swedish attack go uncontested, and made several counter-attacks. On August 23, 1658 almost 3,000 students, sailors and soldiers staged a surprise sortie through a hidden passage in the wall, destroying fortifications under construction and capturing three cannons.

Over 200 heated shot a day were hurled into the city, and several large howitzers were brought to bombard the Danish capital, including the 300-pounder "Eric Hansson", earlier used in the siege of Kraków. But the citizens of Copenhagen proved to be resilient and endured the constant barrage.

=== Kronborg captured ===
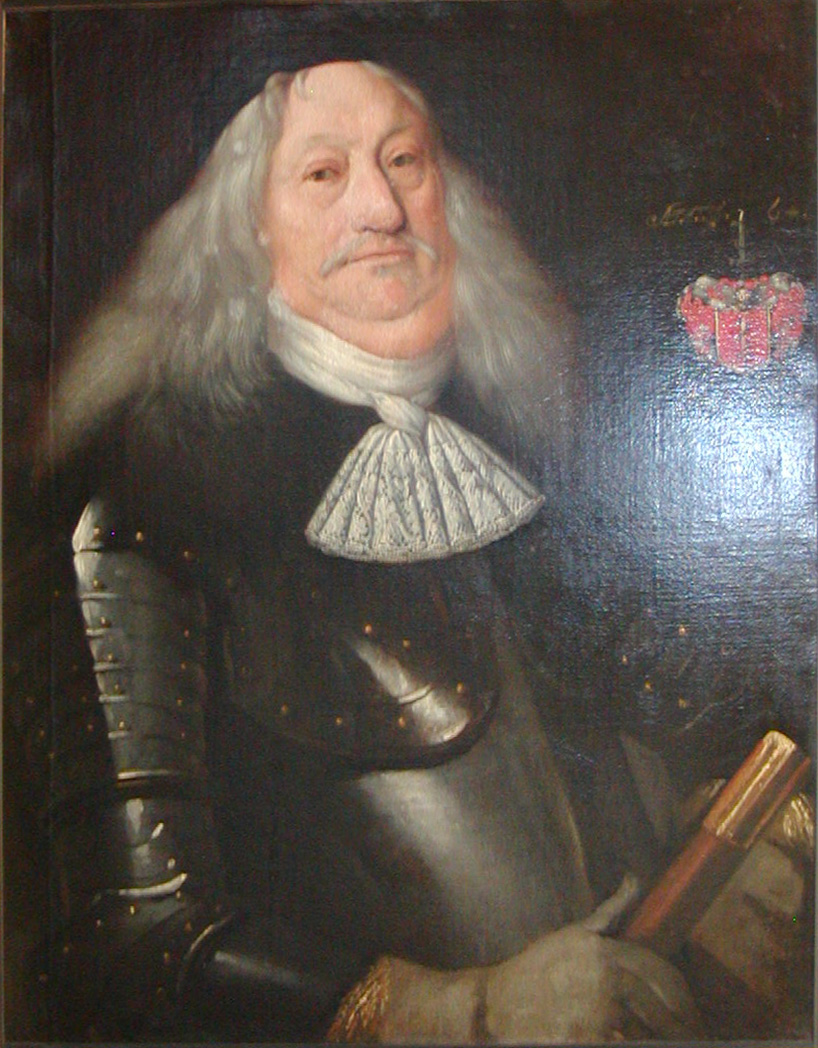
Colonel Poul Beenfeldt, Danish commander of Kronborg.

In a 1649 treaty the Dutch had pledged to defend Denmark against unprovoked aggression, and from a Swedish point of view it was essential to establish naval supremacy in Øresund to keep the Dutch out should they decide to intervene in the conflict. Kronborg Castle sat near the narrowest part of Øresund, a sound only four kilometres wide, which gave the castle a supreme strategic importance. Frederick III had appointed the colonel Poul Beenfeldt commander of the castle and ordered him to defend it at all costs. Should he fail in that, Kronborg was to be blown up to prevent the Swedes from using it.

On August 16 the Swedes arrived at Helsingør, took shelter in the city and started bombarding the castle with artillery. The Danes returned the fire, attempting to set the city on fire. They managed to destroy a dozen houses, but the fire did not spread enough to cause a conflagration. Danish artillery rained continually on the Swedish soldiers. However, the Swedish force still managed to advance, taking the outer line of defenses. The mood in the castle darkened, and Beenfeldt's courage wavered. The Lord High Admiral of Sweden, Carl Gustaf Wrangel, resorted to subterfuge and spread the rumor that Copenhagen had fallen and the Swedish soldiers started a false celebration. Discouraged and demoralized, the Danes capitulated. The loss of Kronborg was a blow for the Danish; 77 captured cannons were quickly put to use in the siege and with the castle in Swedish hands, it was believed that the Dutch would have a difficult time to come to aid.

=== Battle of the Sound ===
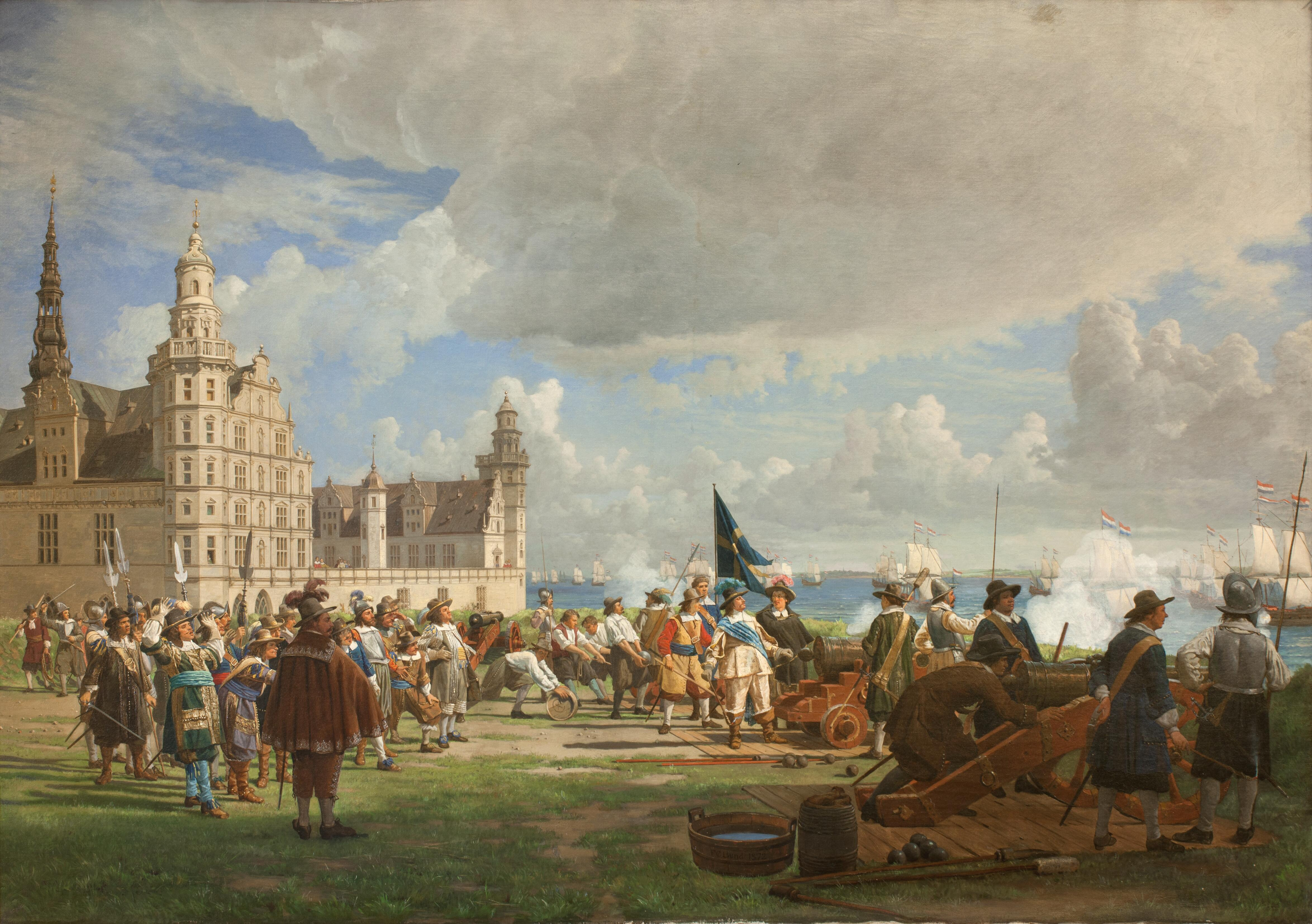
The Dutch fleet under Obdam passes Kronborg castle

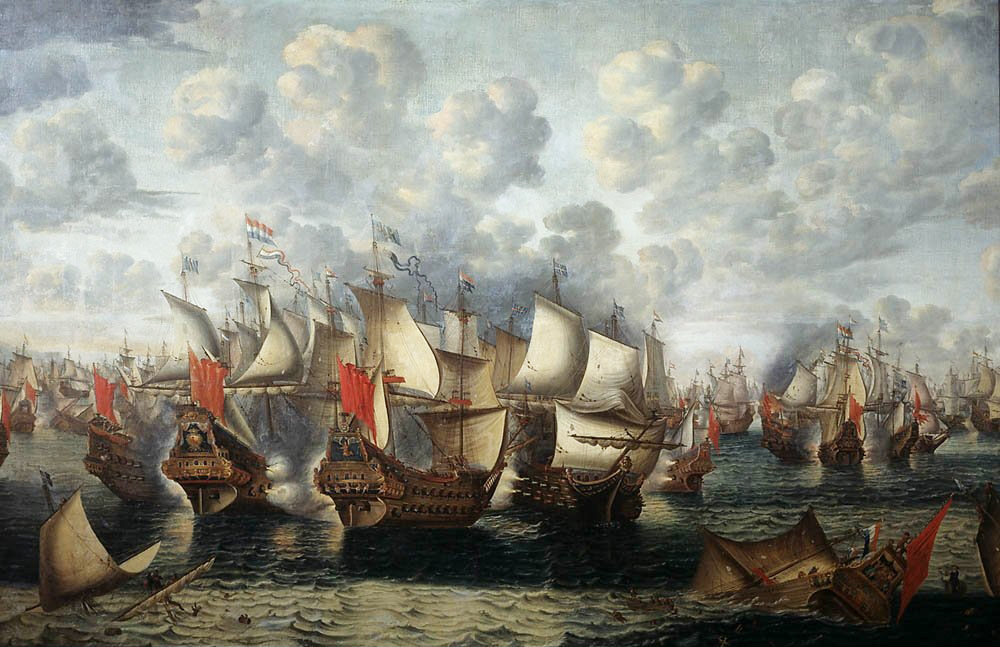
The Battle of the Sound was fought on October 29, 1658. Painting by Jan Abrahamsz Beerstraaten, 1660.

Despite Swedish hopes that the Dutch would not enter the conflict, they honored their 1649 treaty by sending a 45-ship relief fleet. On October 7, 1658 the Dutch fleet set sail from Vlie. Two weeks later, on October 22, it anchored northwest of Helsingør, unable to proceed for six days due to wind conditions. Wrangel suggested the Swedes should attack, but Charles X still wanted to avoid provoking the Dutch.

On October 29 at eight o'clock in the morning, a shot was heard from the Dutch flagship. It was the signal to advance and smash the Swedish line. The Dutch fleet was divided into three squadrons. Vice Admiral Witte de With on the 54-gun ship Brederod and his 11-ship squadron led the charge, followed by Admiral Jacob van Wassenaer Obdam on the 72-gun Eendracht with 13 ships in the squadron. The last squadron, led by Pieter Floriszoon had 11 ships. In total, the Dutch fleet consisted of 45 ships with 1,838 cannons and 4,000 sailors. Following the warships, many transports with large quantities of food and supplies as well as 28 regiments of experienced soldiers followed, in total 2 300 men. Standing against them was a Swedish navy force led by Carl Gustaf Wrangel and Admiral Klas Hansson Bjelkenstjerna, consisting of 43 ships, with 1,605 cannons and 4,055 sailors. The Swedes also had great hopes that the coastal artillery of Kronborg would inflict great damage. Charles personally fired the first hostile shot from Kronborg, but it fell short; the Dutch had wisely chosen to sail closer to the Swedish side, where there were fewer land-based guns to contend with. The Swedish force had more guns, but the Dutch had the advantage of the wind. In the narrow straits of Øresund, nearly a hundred warships now battled.

The engagement was confusing for both sides, and the view was soon obscured by gunpowder smoke. Many ships on both sides were badly damaged, and around 2,000 men killed or wounded. Towards the end, a squadron of Danish ships met up with Dutch and escorted them into the harbor of Copenhagen. The Swedish fleet had failed; much-needed reinforcements and supplies had reached the beleaguered Danish town. The combined Danish and Dutch fleet now had control of the seas, forcing the Swedish fleet to seek refuge in the harbor of Landskrona on the Swedish mainland.

=== Attack on Copenhagen ===
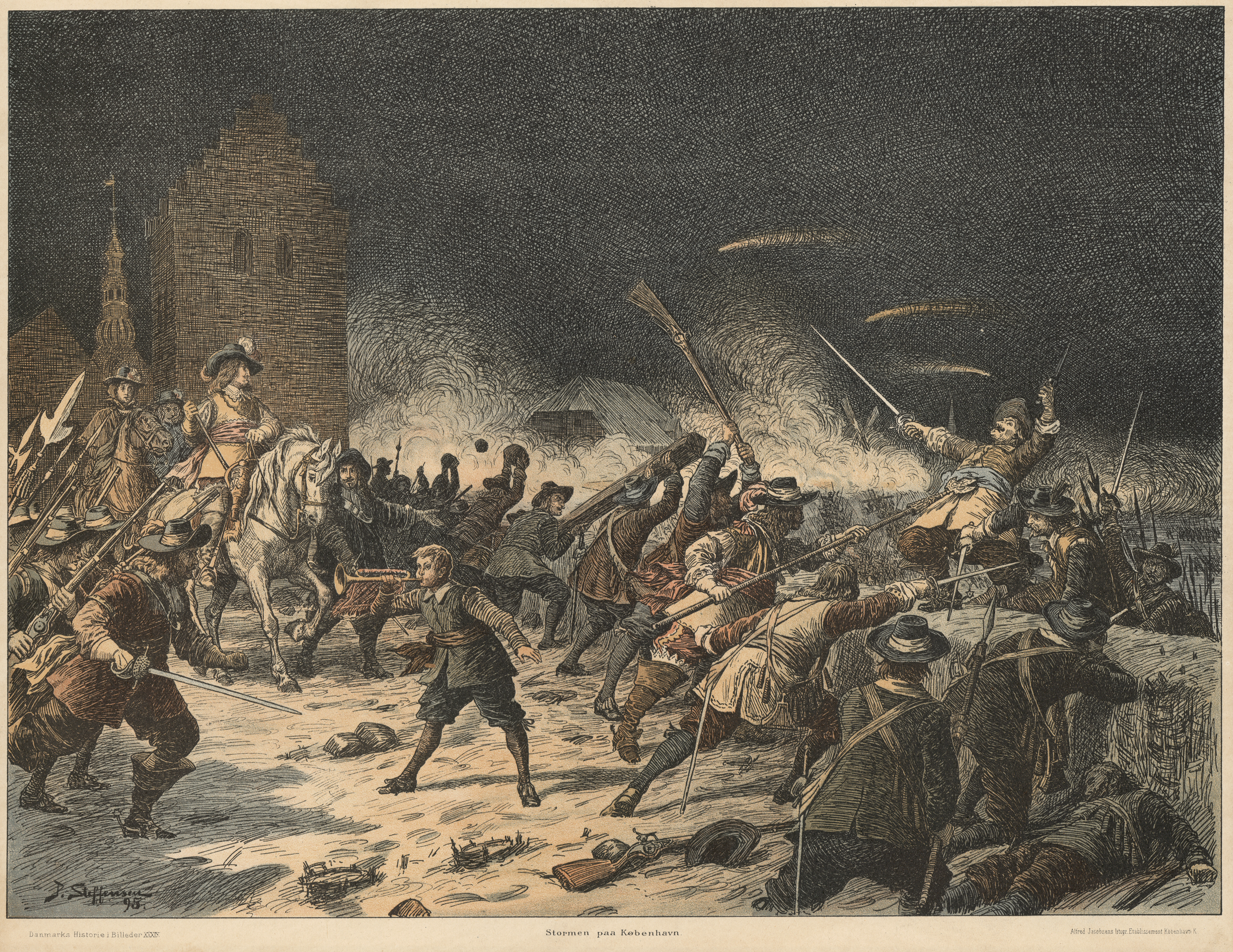
Scene from the Swedish assault on Copenhagen, February 11, 1659. Painting by Poul Steffensen (1898).

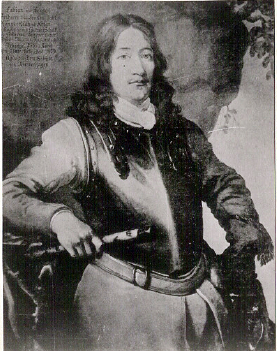
Major general Fabian von Fersen, commander of one of the attacking divisions during the assault on Copenhagen.

After six months of siege the Dutch had re-opened the sea lanes. Charles now faced a difficult choice: if he tried to sue for peace, the conditions would have been worse than the previous peace. The other option was an all-out attack on Copenhagen, hoping that conquering the city would end the war. The number of Swedish attackers is somewhat uncertain, roughly 8,000 men, comprising 4,500 infantry, 2,000 cavalry, 1,000 sailors and a few hundred gunners. The king planned the attack meticulously, but neglected to uphold adequate secrecy; the Danes were soon fully aware of the details of the Swedish attack plan thanks to a number of deserters and spies able to move between the encampments. The Danes had 6,000 trained soldiers, and an additional 5,000 men and women from the city had also taken up weapons, bringing the number of defenders to 11,000.

The Swedish forces had performed diversionary attacks on the outskirts of the city on two consecutive nights in order to tire the defenders, and at midnight on February 11, 1659, the main attack commenced. The main spearhead of the Swedish forces attacked from south of St. Jørgens lake with the King himself in overall command. A hundred cannons on Slotsholmen were brought to bear on the Swedish attackers with fast and accurate fire. The two attacking divisions advanced nevertheless, led by major general Fabian von Fersen and major general Johan von Essen. They reached the outer palisades on the ice, which were quickly breached, but the Swedes were immediately stopped by holes in the ice that the Danes had cut. The bridges they had brought were not long enough after the ice moats had been widened with the help of Dutch marines. Caught on the ice, the Swedes were in the open and subject to heavy fire. Longer bridges were eventually brought, and the attack continued towards the city walls. The battle was ferocious, with the attackers desperately trying to establish a bridgehead on the walls. But in the end, the defenders were successful and the Swedes were thrown back.

The northern attack force moved south towards Østerport where the fortification Kastellet laid. The Swedes got very close to Nyboder and were in the process of crossing the moat, when they fell victim to a well-conducted ambush, and withdrew with heavy losses. Around 6 in the morning, Charles X of Sweden knew that all attacks had failed. He ordered a retreat to the outskirts of the city, back to the starting position.

The victory was important for the Danes. Not only had their arch-enemy been defeated, out of the smoldering city came a stronger bourgeoisie with renewed confidence, more privileges and an improved position vis-a-vis the Danish crown. In many ways, it was a new Denmark which emerged from the assault of its capital on February 12, 1659.

=== The Allies invade Funen ===
When the Swedish invaded Zealand in August 1658, the Dutch Republic was not the only foreign power that took notice. A union between Brandenburg, Poland and Austria had already started to put together a relief army in December 1657, but preparations of the polyglot force took so long that the Treaty of Roskilde was signed before the army was ready to march. However, the preparations were not in vain—with the 1658 invasion the allies were in an excellent position to quickly put together a force and march towards Denmark.

Thanks to the earlier preparations, a large force of 14,500 Brandenburgers under Frederick William, 10,600 Austrians led by the Italian Field Marshal Raimondo Montecuccoli and 4,500 Poles led by Stefan Czarniecki had crossed the Oder on September 14, 1658. Swedish possessions in Central Europe all along the Baltic coast were under attack, and the Austrians at least were enthusiastic in Pomerania sending an army of 17,000 to lay a siege on Stettin where they joined 13,000 Brandenburgers. and also moved towards Jutland. However, the anti-Swedish coalition suffered internal conflicts. The Polish opinion of Austria was in rapid decline, and their enthusiasm for the campaign was at best lukewarm.

Nevertheless, the allies managed to take possession over Jutland and the Swedish commander Philip of Sulzbach was forced into a long series of retreats. On May 19, 1659, the Swedes abandoned their last positions at Fredriksodde and took up positions at Funen. Less than two weeks later, on May 31, 1659 the first allied assault on Funen began with 9,000 soldiers. Against them stood 4,000 Swedes, considerably fewer, but consisting of battle-hardened veterans. The first attack was duly repelled. On June 26, a second attempt was made: the allies landed after heavy fire had pounded what was thought to be the Swedish positions. However, the Swedes had pulled back and returned unscathed with heavy fire of their own. The invaders were again thrown back. Before a third attempt could be made, a Swedish naval squadron under Owen Coxe managed to sink a large number of the invading fleet at the naval battle of Ebeltoft, and took 1,000 prisoners. In the end the allies had not succeeded to invade Funen, and a decision was taken to instead go back and attack Swedish Pomerania.

Meanwhile, other European powers had decided that it was not in their interest that any one power should dominate the Baltic Sea. After long negotiations, known as the first Concert of the Hague, England sent a large fleet of 43 ships with more than 2,000 cannons. The force did not directly participate in fighting but nevertheless sent a clear message to the Dutch fleet patrolling the Danish waters. England worked hard to broker a peace, aided by France which also declared its willingness to help the Swedes if the Danes refused to negotiate.

=== Battle of Nyborg ===
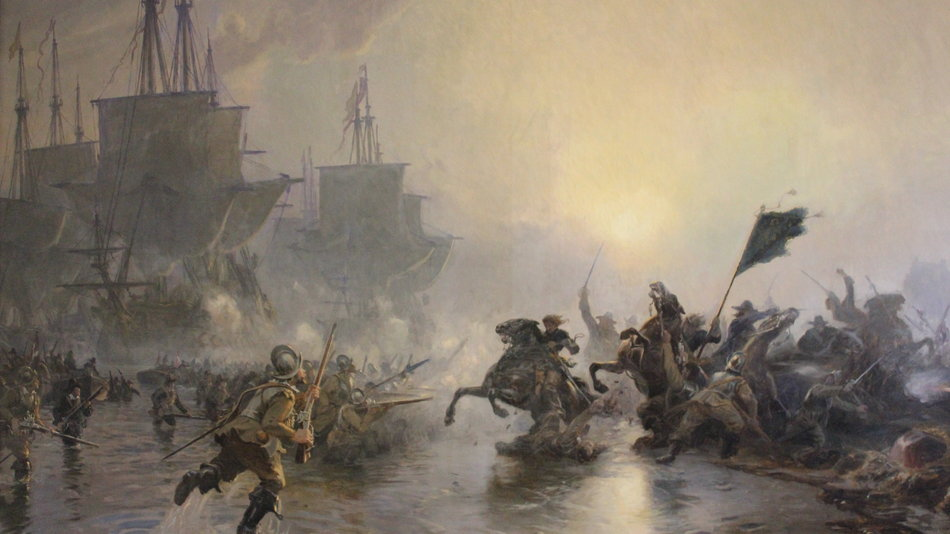
The landing at Kerteminde, at the island of Funen, on November 11, 1659 by one corps of the allied army consisting of Danish, German, Polish and Dutch troops under field marshal Hans Schack. Painting by Christian Mølsted.

On November 11 Hans Schack and his forces boarded Dutch transport ships to take them to the east side of Funen. After some false starts, due to weather and Swedish resistance, he managed to land near Kerteminde. Major general Ernst Albrecht von Eberstein was in charge of the allied forces that had been left on Jutland, and was also moving towards Funen; landfall was made two days later without any Swedish resistance. Both Eberstein and Schack marched towards Odense, meeting up on November 12. So far, the invasion of Funen was going smoothly for the combined Danish and allied forces.

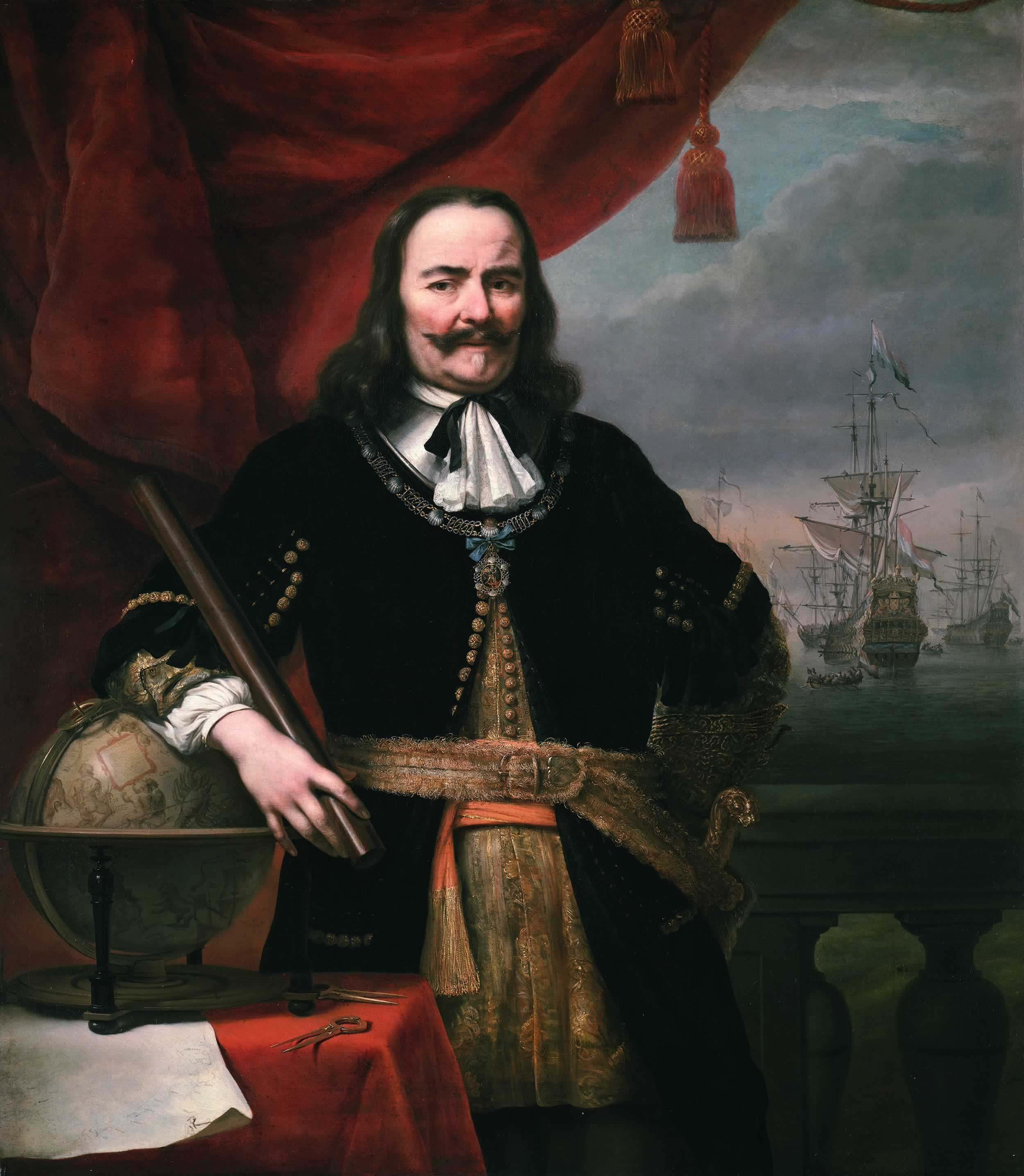
Michiel Adriaenszoon de Ruyter, the famous Dutch admiral who took command of an expeditionary fleet which managed to liberate Nyborg in 1659. For this he was knighted by King Frederick III of Denmark.

The Swedish commander Sulzbach made a tactical error in not attacking either Schack or Eberstein before they could join up, even though his generals urged him to do so. Instead, he chose to withdraw to Nyborg. The Swedish king was not pleased and immediately sent Gustaf Otto Stenbock to relieve Sulzback of his command. When Stenbock arrived he found the city's defenses wanting and sent a note to the king that he could not guarantee that he would hold the city.

Instead of immediately taking advantage of the situation, Eberstein and Shack quarreled over who should command the combined forces. The impasse was finally resolved by Ebestein and Shack by agreeing that they would hold command the forces every other day.

The Swedish commanders had decided they must try to make a stand. A few kilometers west of Nyborg the Swedish forces of about 5,500 men stood in battle formation in the way of the advancing forces. The Swedes had a good position, with a small lake on the left flank and a forest on the right, providing good cover for a retreat to Nyborg should it be necessary. Opposing them were 9,000 men, with Eberstein in command that day. They divided into two lines, each commanded by the respective commanders. Thrice Eberstein attacked; only to be rebuffed by intensive Swedish fire and cavalry attacks. Eberstein himself was almost captured, only narrowly escaping.

Even then, Eberstein refused to ask Schack for assistance in the battle. Colonel Ditlev Ahlefeldt of the allied forces would not to let pride and vanity be the downfall of the attack and pleaded with Schack to attack. Shack brandished his rapier and mounted a forceful attack into the Swedish left flank. A bloody engagement ensued, but the Swedish cavalry was no match for the rested Danish forces—they fled towards Nyborg leaving the infantry defenseless. The Polish riders showed no pardon, cutting down the Swedish infantry almost to a man. The Dutch also intervened with an expeditionary fleet led by Michiel Adriaenszoon de Ruyter.

The Swedes had fought bravely. Salzback had personally dispatched 8 men. But their losses were heavy, over 2,000 men had been killed, almost half the force while the allies had lost 1,900 men. The defenses at Nyborg was in no condition to withstand a siege. There was nothing for the Swedish to do but to surrender, forcing 5,000 men into captivity; Sweden had suffered a devastating defeat.

The Latvian city of Mitau (Jelgava) fell to Polish-Lithuanian forces commanded by Aleksander Hilary Połubiński in January 1660 and the allies were preparing an invasion of Zeeland; the outlook was not good for the Swedes. Fortunately for them, the war would soon end.

=== Insurgencies ===
The Swedes were not popular in the regions that Sweden had gained at the Treaty of Roskilde in 1658. With the new war going badly, insurgents saw their chance to rise up against the unpopular rule. Swedish response, especially in Scania, was more subtle than one might believe. An all out terror campaign would have been economically disastrous. Instead small patrols searching the woods were often employed combined with promises of carrots or sticks to the local farmers.

=== Bohuslän and Frederikshald ===
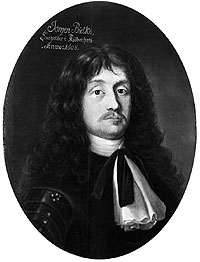
Lieutenant general Jørgen Bjelke, Commander-in-chief of the Norwegian army. Painted around 1655.

The fortress of Fredriksten above the town of Frederikshald in Norway was attacked by Swedish forces and repulsed by the Norwegian army three times during the years 1658–60. After each withdrawal the Swedes would return in greater force, but never succeeded in capturing the strong fortress. Norwegians called the battles in this theatre of war "bjelkefeiden" ("the Bjelke feud") after the commander-in-chief of the Norwegian army, lieutenant general Jørgen Bjelke. After each attack on Frederiksten, Bjelke invaded the former Norwegian province of Bohuslän and twice succeeded in reconquering most of it.

The first Swedish attack on Frederikshald started on 14 September 1658 with a force of 1600 under Harald Stake, who falsely believed the town to be undefended. But Frederikshald was defended by two companies of the civic militia under captain Peder Olsen Normand, who had taken up a position on the Overberget hill south of the town. Detachments from the regiments of Oppland and Østfold with four cannons came to their rescue. The Swedish attackers were taken by surprise and were completely defeated the day after their arrival.

The second battle of Frederikshald took place in February 1659. Harald Stake was back with 4000 men, who approached the town across the frozen inlet of Svinesund and opened artillery fire from the island Sauøya. He then let his infantry attack from the west across the river Tista. Its bridge was defended by some companies under Tønne Huitfeldt and Peder Normand. The Oppland and Østfold regiments together with four cavalry squadrons remained inside the town as strategic reserves. Bjelke, having arrived some days earlier, was in command of the Norwegian forces. The Swedes initially drove the defenders back across the Tista bridge, but were halted at the bridgehead. After heavy losses the Swedes retreated to the far side of the river. The Norwegians then prepared for a renewed attack by fortifying the weak spots around Frederikshald.

An even greater Swedish force of 5000 soldiers (of which 3000 were cavalry) under Lars Kagg, Gustaf Horn and Harald Stake laid siege to Frederikshald in January 1660. They captured some forward defensive positions, but the sudden death of Charles X on February 13 was a probable cause for lifting the siege February 22.

=== Trondheim ===
The Trøndelag province in which Trondheim is the largest city is situated in the center of Norway. As a result of the Treaty of Roskilde in 1658, the cession of Trøndelag had divided Norway into two parts with no land connection between the north and south. Later that year, however, Trøndelag was reconquered by Norwegian army units under their commander-in-chief, lieutenant general Jørgen Bjelke.

Already on September 28, 1658, a small fleet of three ships and several smaller boats landed the Norwegian forces close to Trondheim. The Swedish governor Claes Stiernsköld had 120 cavalry and 600 infantrymen under his command with the Swedish ship Gotland in the harbor of Trondheim. Two Dano-Norwegian ships attacked Gotland, though no significant damage was inflicted on either side.

A small Swedish reinforcement force arrived in Trondheim, but both food and ammunition were in short supply. On October 4, the Norwegian forces arrived at the city reinforced by 1,000 peasants from the surrounding countryside who had taken up arms. When hearing that aid was near, the population of the city revolted, but the uprising within Trondheim was quickly suppressed. Charles X ordered Lieutenant Colonel Erik Drakenberg to assemble a force in Jämtland and march towards Trondheim, but the relief was stopped by Norwegian peasants that had taken to the hills and defended the mountain passages.

The Norwegian forces increased the pressure on Trondheim and red-hot shot rained down on the city daily. Despite Stiernsköld's swearing to "boil soup on his leather pants before surrendering" he was nevertheless forced to leave the city on December 11. According to the terms of the surrender, Stiernsköld and his men were allowed to leave under military honors with 2,500 men presenting arms.

=== Bornholm ===
On April 29, 1658 Bornholm was presented with its new governor: Colonel Printzensköld, who arrived with his family and 120 soldiers. Printzensköld soon enacted a number of unpopular taxes and many of the island's young men were conscripted. In addition, plague had hit the island hard 4 years earlier, killing 5,000 of the population of 13,000. The island was seething with anger and resentment, and after the Swedish invasion of Denmark Frederick III sent letters to leading men in the community, urging them to revolt. They wasted no time, and Printzensköld was shot dead during an inspection tour on December 8, 1659. The remaining Swedes, mostly Scanians who had little reason to be loyal to the Swedish King, surrendered. The Swedish navy was otherwise occupied and could offer no relief. Bornholm was again under Danish control.

=== Scania ===
One of Frederick III's bodyguards, Statius, traveled to Scania to organize the peasants into Snapphane units and instigate anti-Swedish sentiment. In Malmö, a cabal of rich bourgeoisie, led by Bartholomaeus Mikkelsen, planned a revolt. The conspiracy tried to recruit one of Malmös two mayors, Efvert Wiltfang, but he would not commit himself to the uprising, even though he said he would support Frederick III. At the end of December, the Danes embarked on a foray into Scania, but were foiled by bad weather and poor navigation. Meanwhile, the Swedish authorities had become aware of the plot and the main leaders were arrested, among them Mikkelsen and Wildfang, and the conspirators were sentenced to death. On December 22, 1659 Mikkelsen and two others were beheaded, but in an attempt to placate the Scanian people the execution of Wiltfang and 10 others was stayed. The uprising had been averted, but rebels and insurgents continued to operate in the countryside.

== Peace and aftermath ==
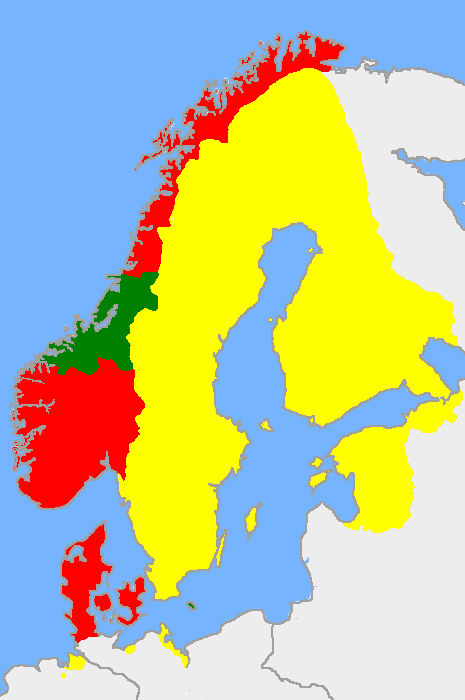
The political borders in Scandinavia in 1658. The areas in green were returned to Denmark-Norway in the 1660 peace treaty.

Charles X fell ill in the beginning of 1660 and died of pneumonia on the night of February 13, 1660. With the death of the Swedish king, one of the major obstacles to peace was out of the way; in April the Treaty of Oliva was signed with the Allies (Polish-Lithuanian Commonwealth, Austria and Brandenburg). However, the Danes were not keen on peace after their recent success. After further concessions, the Dutch released the blockade on Landskrona, allowing the Swedish fleet out in the Øresund strait and blockade Copenhagen. Danish diplomacy soon got the Dutch back on their side again, and real war between Sweden and the Dutch Republic seemed imminent. The French and English intervened in favor of the Swedes and the situation was again teetering on the edge of a major conflict.

The Danish statesman Hannibal Sehested was instructed by Frederick III to negotiate with the Swedes, and the resulting peace treaty can largely be credited to him. Without any direct involvement by foreign powers, the Danes and Swedes managed to negotiate the Treaty of Copenhagen within weeks, much to the surprise of both parties. A bone of contention was the islands of Hven and Bornholm, the latter having received the Danish king's personal promise of protection. In the end, Bornholm remained under Danish control in exchange for a number of estates in the south of present-day Sweden.

In the Treaty of Roskilde two years earlier, Denmark-Norway had been forced to cede the Danish provinces of Scania, Halland, Blekinge, the island of Bornholm and the Norwegian provinces Trøndelag and Bohuslän. The Treaty of Copenhagen reaffirmed the Swedish rule over Scania, Halland, Blekinge, and Bohuslän, while Bornholm and Trøndelag were returned. It was a significant victory for Denmark-Norway, but it did not result in a reversal of the costly earlier peace. The treaty of 1660 established political borders between Denmark, Sweden and Norway which have lasted to the present.

The bold March across the Belts had threatened Copenhagen so seriously that it had won the previous war for Charles. When his attempt to follow through with his previous venture failed, he proved unable to suppress militarily the combined forces of his foes. Sweden had come close to dominating the Baltic, which was not in the interest of the major powers. England, France and to a lesser extent the Netherlands all favored a return to the status quo of the Roskilde peace. In Denmark, the war resulted in sweeping social changes. Frederick III browbeat the nobility which had long held power in Denmark into accepting a hereditary and absolute monarchy.
