= Battle of Ebeltoft =

1659 naval battle off the coast of Denmark

- Part of the Dano-Swedish War (1658–1660)
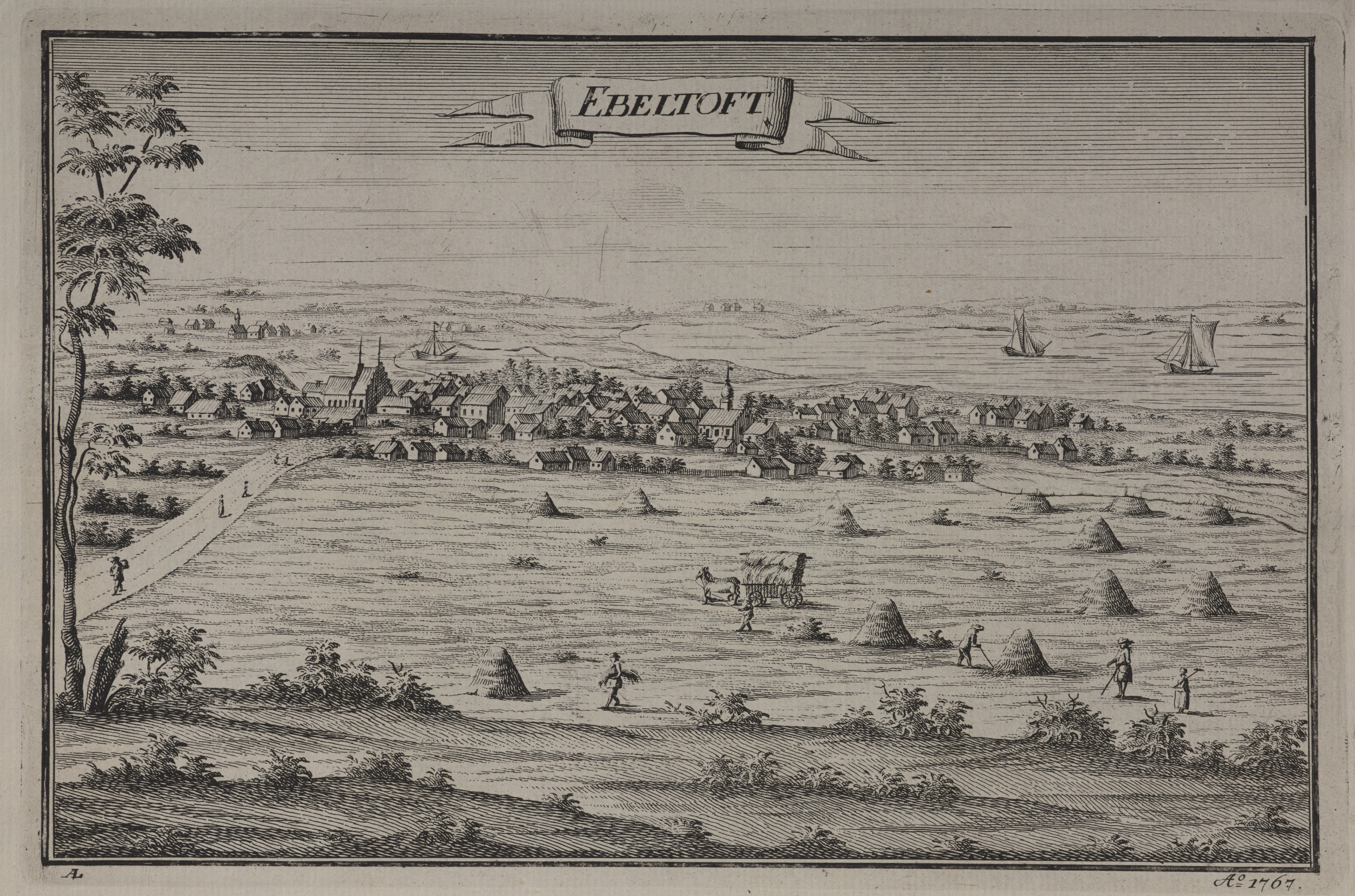
- View of Ebeltoft, engraving by Alexia de Lode, c. 1760
Date	23 July 1659
Location	Ebeltoft bay, Denmark
Result	Swedish victory

Belligerents
(yes) Swedish Empire	Dutch Republic; Denmark–Norway; Holy Roman Empire; Brandenburg

Commanders and leaders
(Swedish Empire) Owen Coxe	(Dutch Republic) Peder Jansen (DOW)

Strength
8 frigates 1 galiot 1 fire ship	(Dutch Republic) 3 frigates (Denmark–Norway) 2 frigates

Casualties and losses
Negligible	1 frigate exploded 4 frigates captured 1,000 captured

The Battle of Ebeltoft was a naval battle between a Swedish and a Danish/Dutch fleet, during the Dano-Swedish War of 1658 to 1660. The allied fleet was ordered to secure a troop transport fleet to the Swedish-controlled island Fyn. Eight Swedish frigates under the command of Owen Coxe attacked the fleet and took the allies by surprise. After a long fight one Dutch ship exploded, the rest of the Danish/Dutch ships were captured and the transport fleet was destroyed. The Danish captain was badly wounded and died during the battle. After the battle, Owen Coxe was ennobled under the name Siölöw.

== Sources ==
- Martin Pavón: Søslaget i Ebeltoft Vig, "1001 fortællinger om Danmark"
- ↑ "Søværnets mærkedage - Juli". Flådens historie. 2008-05-30. Hentet 2011-12-07.
- Ulf Sundberg, Hjalmarson and Högberg (1998). Svenska krig 1521-1814
- Jensen, Knud; Vedsted, Jakob (1994). Ebeltoft - en søkøbstad [Ebeltoft – a port town] (PDF) (in Danish). Ebeltoft: Ebeltoft Museum. p. 12.
