= Ernst Albrecht von Eberstein =

German army commander

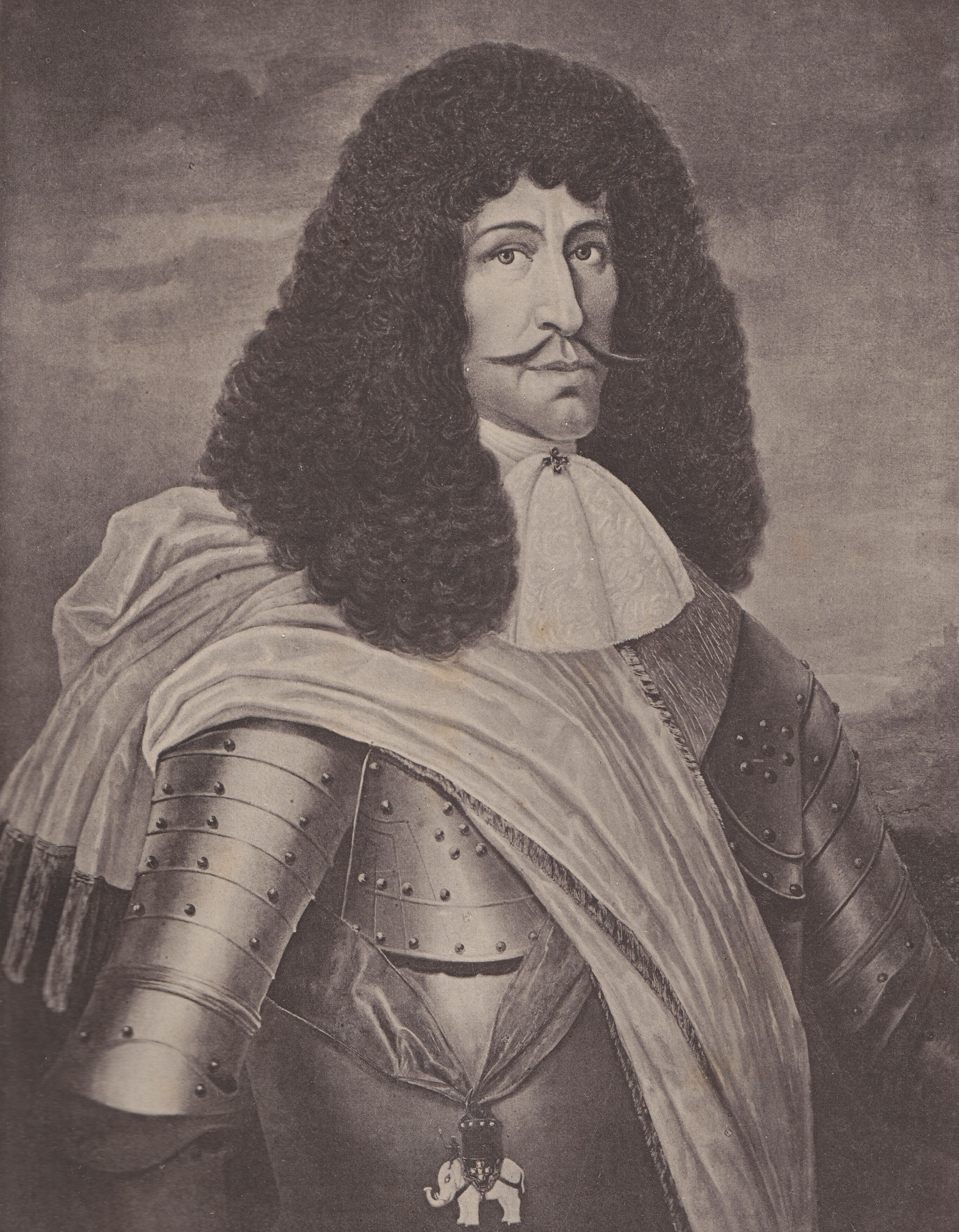
Ernst Albrecht von Eberstein

Ernst Albrecht von Eberstein (6 June 1605 in Gehofen – 9 June 1676 in Sangerhausen) was a German Army Commander, Saxon Field Marshal and Knight in the Danish Order of the Elephant.

== Career ==
Eberstein was the son of Wolf Dietrich von Eberstein (1575–1627) and Elisabeth von Lauterbach (1583–1664). Already at a young age, he joined the army of his uncle who fought for the Dutch Republic. He was also present at the Battle of White Mountain in 1620. Between 1623 and 1648, he fought in the Thirty Years' War for several employers. First in Tilly's army, then for Sweden, William V, Landgrave of Heße-Kaßel, again for Sweden and finally for George II, Landgrave of Heße-Darmstadt. In March 1648, he was promoted to Lieutenant field marshal.

After the war, he retired on his estate in Gehofen, until 1657, when he travelled to Denmark, to support the country in the Second Northern War against Sweden. In November 1659, together with Hans Schack, he won a very important victory over the Swedes at the Battle of Nyborg. For this, he received the Order of the Elephant.

On 1 January 1666 he became Field Marshal of the Saxon troops, a post he held until his death in 1676.

He married Ottilie Elisabeth von Ditfurth (1618-1675) and had 8 sons and 6 daughters.
He was also a member of the Fruitbearing Society.

== Source ==
Deutsche Biographie : Eberstein, Ernst Albrecht von
