= Lord High Admiral of Sweden =

Position

- Admiralty of Sweden
- Status: Post abolished
- Member of: Swedish Privy Council; Great Officers of the Realm
- Formation: c. 1571
- First holder: Clas (Eriksson) Fleming
- Final holder: Gustaf Otto Stenbock
- Abolished: 1676
- Unofficial names: Admiral of the Realm

The Lord High Admiral or Admiral of the Realm (Swedish: riksamiral) was a prominent and influential office in Sweden, from c. 1571 until 1676, excluding periods when the office was out of use. The office holder was a member of the Swedish Privy Council and the head of the navy and Admiralty of Sweden. From 1634, the Lord High Admiral was one of five Great Officers of the Realm.

== History ==
The origin of the title "Lord High Admiral of Sweden" can be traced to the reign of king Erik XIV and the year 1561 or possibly 1562. An överste amiral ("highest admiral") is assigned to be responsible for the Swedish fleet. In practice, however, this office meant not, as it was supposed to from the beginning, caring for the administration concerning the fleet, for example constructing and equipping it. Erik's successor, younger brother John III, appointed Clas Fleming riksamiral, probably in 1571, and once again it was intended that the office would mean administration, and not just a commanding role in the occasion of naval warfare. Fleming stood on king Sigismund's side during the conflict against Duke Charles in the 1590s. When Charles eventually took over as king (as Charles IX) in the early 17th century, a Lord High Admiral was included among the higher office-holders.

In the 1610s, during Göran Gyllenstierna's period as Lord High Admiral, the office began to mean specific assignments in a more regular way than before. An admiralty (Amiralitetet) was established that was introduced as one of five branches of the Swedish government in 1634 (under a new name; Amiralitetskollegiet). The heads of the five departments were called Great Officers of the Realm and were the five most prominent members of the Swedish Privy Council. Lord High Admiral, one of these five officers, was third in rank in the quintet.

In 1676, the office was abolished. Gustaf Otto Stenbock, the holder of the office at that time, received the title överste amiral instead. When Stenbock died in 1685, this title was withdrawn as well. King Charles XI, who had come to age in 1672, wanted to avoid appointing new holders of the high offices, once these became vacant. The riksamiral title has not been used since, in contrast to two other offices that Charles XI abolished, Lord High Chancellor and Lord High Steward, who were both revived for a relatively short period in the late 18th century.

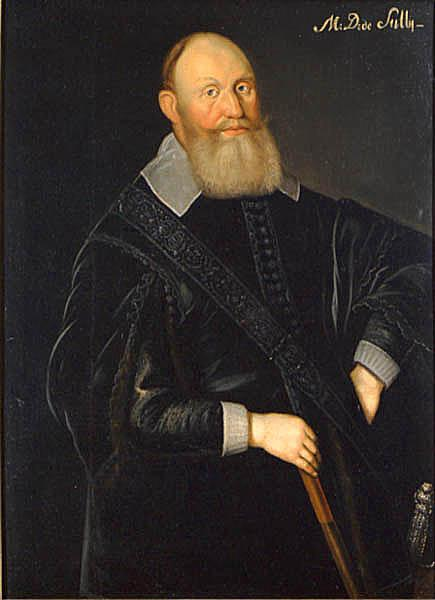
Carl (Carlsson) Gyllenhielm - Lord High Admiral 1620–1650

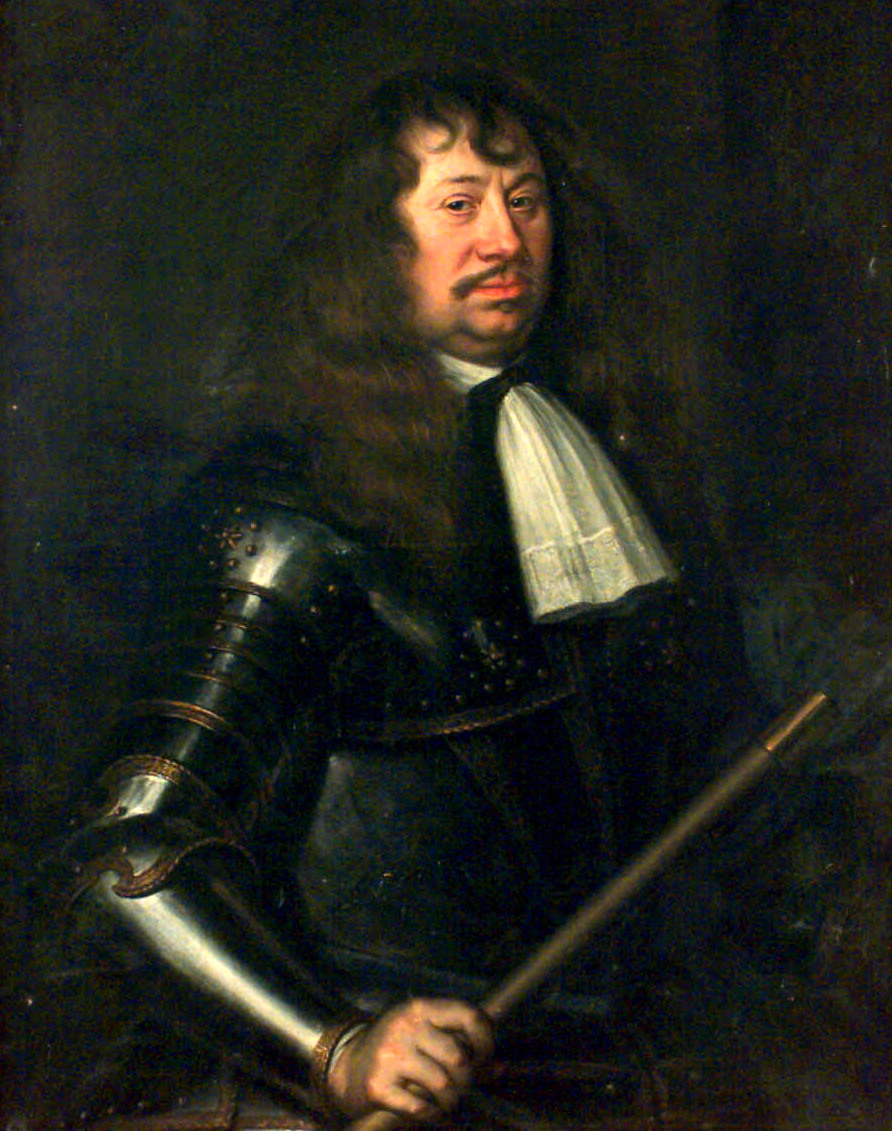
Carl Gustaf Wrangel - Lord High Admiral 1657–1664

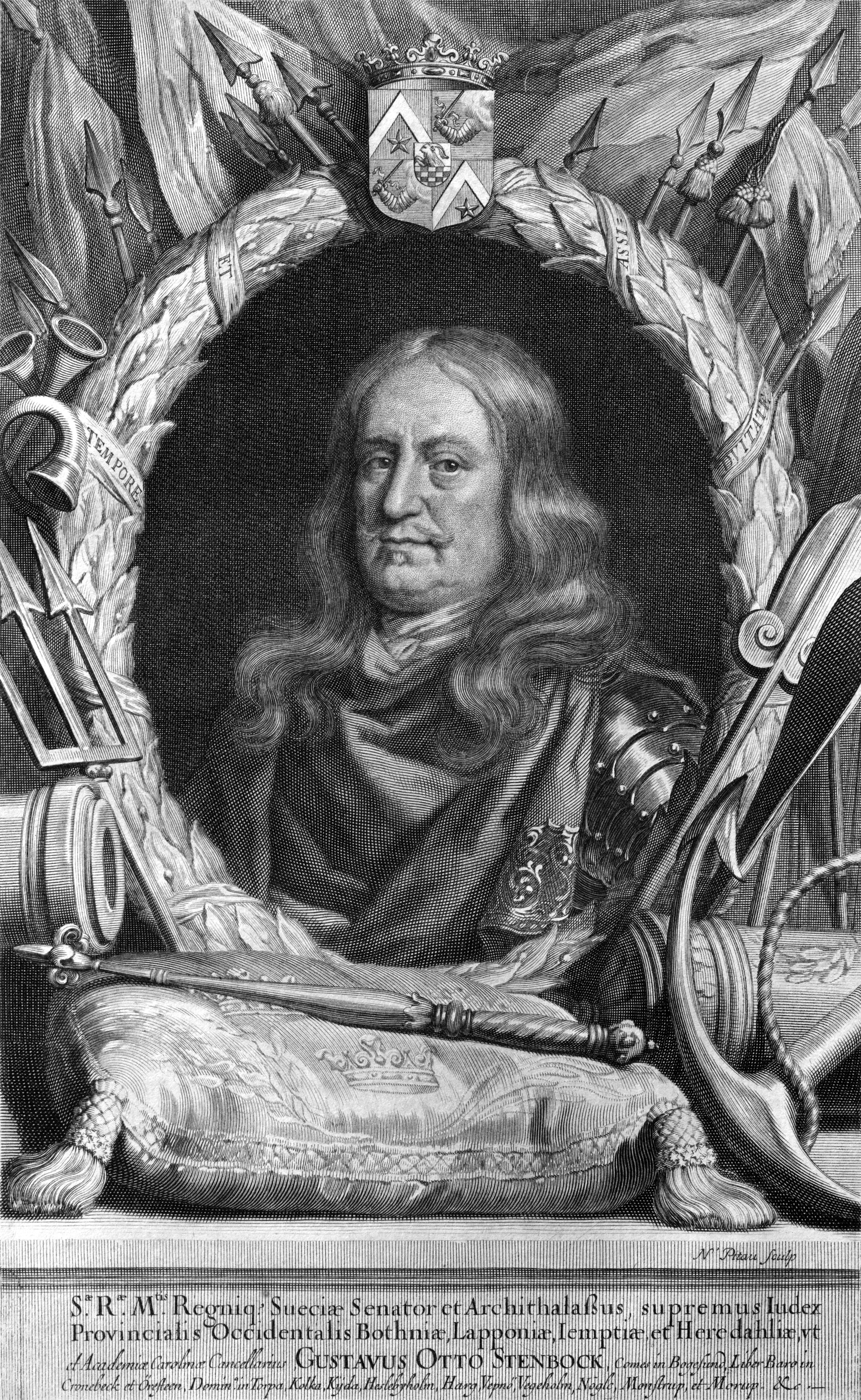
Gustaf Otto Stenbock - last Lord High Admiral 1664–1676

== Lord High Admirals of Sweden ==
Name	Entered office	Left office	Notes
Clas (Eriksson) Fleming	1571? or 1588?	circa 1595?	
Axel (Nilsson) Ryning	1602	1611	
Göran Gyllenstierna	1612	1618	
Carl (Carlsson) Gyllenhielm	1620	1650	
Gabriel (Bengtsson) Oxenstierna	1652	1656	
Carl Gustav Wrangel	1657	1664	
Gustaf Otto Stenbock	1664	1676	
