= Carl Gustaf Wrangel =

Field Marshal of Sweden (1613–1676)

Count Carl Gustaf Wrangel
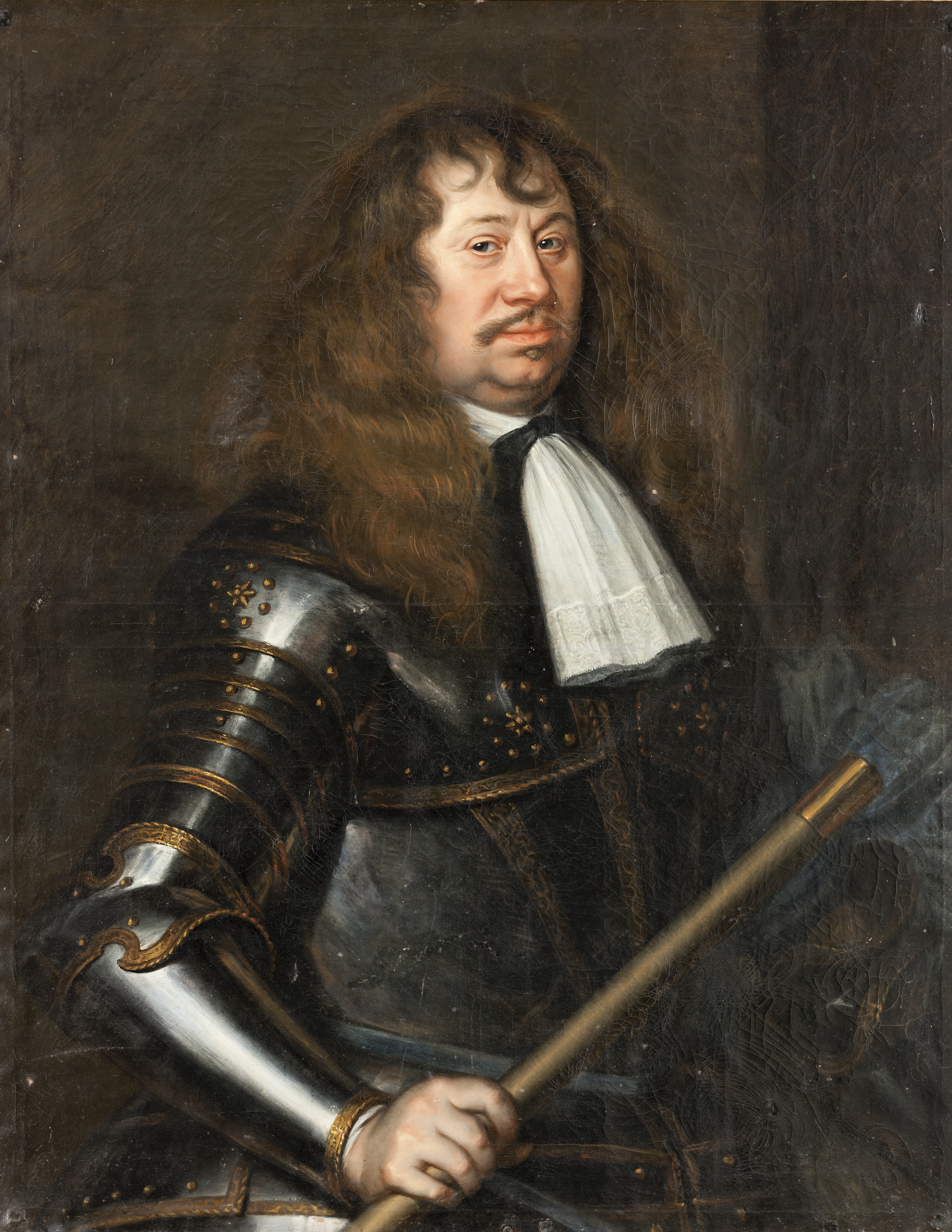
- Portrait by Matthäus Merian the Younger (1662)
- Born: 23 December 1613; Uppsala, Sweden
- Died: 5 July 1676 (aged 62); Spyker on Rügen, Swedish Pomerania
- Burial place: Skokloster, Sweden
- Military career
- Allegiance: Sweden
- Rank: Field Marshal (Fältmarskalk)
- Commands: Swedish–Dutch fleet (1644); Swedish army in Germany (1646–1648); Swedish fleet (1658); Swedish forces in Bremen (1665–1666)
- Conflicts: See list: Thirty Years' War; Bavarian campaign (1646–1647); Attack on Bregenz; Capture of Mainau; Siege of Lindau; Siege of Eger (1647); Battle of Triebl; Battle of Dachau; Torstenson War; Battle of Fehmarn (1644); Conquest of Bornholm (1645); Siege of Hammershus; Second Northern War; Battle of Warsaw (1656); Dano-Swedish War (1657–1658); Assault on Bützfleth redoubt; Assault on Lehe sconce; March Across the Belts; Siege of Fredriksodde; Dano-Swedish War (1658–1660); Siege of Kronborg; Swedish conquest of Langeland (1659); Siege of Nakskov (1659); Montecuccoli's landing on Funen; Siege of Stettin (1659); Swedish–Bremian War (1666); Scanian War
- Other work: Governor-General of Swedish Pomerania; Lord High Constable of Sweden; Chancellor of the University of Greifswald; Supreme Judge in Uppland

Signature
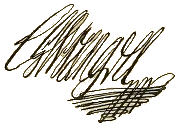

Fältmarskalk Carl Gustaf Wrangel (also Carl Gustav von Wrangel; 23 December 1613 – 5 July 1676) was a Swedish statesman and military commander who commanded the Swedish forces in the Thirty Years' War, as well as the Torstenson, Bremen, Second Northern and Scanian Wars.

A Baltic German, he held the ranks of a Field Marshal, Commander-in-Chief of the Swedish forces in Germany (1646–1648), and Lord High Admiral of Sweden (from 1657). Wrangel was Governor-General of Swedish Pomerania (1648–1652 and 1656–1676) and, from 1664, Lord High Constable of Sweden and a member of the Privy Council. He held the title of a Count of Salmis until 1665, when he became Count of Sölvesborg. By 1673, Wrangel's title was "Count of Sölvesborg, Freiherr of Lindeberg and Ludenhof, Lord of Skokloster, Bremervörde, Wrangelsburg, Spyker, Rappin, Ekebyhov, Gripenberg and Rostorp". (Note: In 1666, he was still addressed Count of Salmis in the Treaty of Habenhausen: "Carl Gustav Wrangel / dero Königl. Maytt. und Reiche Schweden Rath / ReichsMarsch / wie auch General-Stadthalter in Pommern / und OberLandtRichter in Uplandt / Graff zu Salmis / FreyHerr zu Lindenberg und Lüdenhoff / Her: zu SchogKloster / BremerVöhrde / Wrangelsburg / Spieker / Eckebyhoff und Greiffenberg". "FriedensSchluss, Welcher Zwischen Dero Königl. Maytt. zu Schweden u. PLENIPOTENTIARIO, Und ReichsFeldtHerrn, (tit.) Herrn Carl Gustav Wrangels Hoch-Gräflicher Excellentz, Eines, und Herrn Burgermeisteren, Rath, und gemeiner Burgerschafft der Stadt BREMEN, Anderen Theils, gemachet ist im HauptQuartier zu Habenhausen, für Bremen, den 15. Novembris, Anno 1666" (in Estonian and German). Tartu: Ajalooarhiiv. The Estonian Historical Archives. p. 2. Archived from the original on 20 July 2011.)

From 1658, Wrangel was Supreme judge in Uppland, and in 1660, he became Chancellor of the University of Greifswald. He held several estates, primarily in the Dominions of Sweden, where he constructed representative mansions: Wrangelsburg, in Pomerania, still bears his name.

Wrangel is part of the Wrangel family and was a close friend of King Charles X Gustav of Sweden.

== Family ==
Wrangel's wife, Anna Margareta von Haugwitz. Skokloster Castle.

He was born near Uppsala to Baroness Margareta Grip av Vinäs and Herman Wrangel on 23 December 1613. By paternal descent, he was a member of the Wrangel family of Baltic German origin, branches of which settled in Sweden, Russia and Germany.

Wrangel married Anna Margareta von Haugwitz (died 20 March 1673), who bore him eleven children, six of whom died very young. These five children reached adulthood:

- Carl Philipp Wrangel (died 13 April 1668 in London)
- Margareta Juliana Wrangel (born 4 November 1642 during the siege of Leipzig, married to Nils Brahe the Younger, nephew of Per Brahe the Younger, on 21 December 1660)
- Polidora Christiana Wrangel (born 6 November 1655 in Spyker, married to Leonard Johan Wirtenberg von Debern, son of Arvid Wittenberg, in the summer of 1673)
- Eleonora Sophia Wrangel (born 31 August 1651 in Wolgast, married to Ernst Ludwig Freiherr von Putbus on 7 April 1678)
- Augusta Aurora Wrangel (born 15 January 1658 in just conquered Frederiksodde, died unmarried and without issue on 27 January 1699)

== Under Queen Christina ==
At the age of 20, he distinguished himself as a cavalry captain in the Thirty Years' War. Three years later, he became colonel, and in 1638, he became major-general, still serving in Germany. In 1644, during the Torstenson War, he commanded a fleet at sea that defeated the Danes at Fehmarn on 23 October. In June 1645, he led the Swedish conquest of Bornholm, successfully besieging the fortress of Hammershus on the island.

In 1646, he returned to Germany as a Field Marshal and succeeded Lennart Torstenson as Commander-in-chief of the Swedish army in Germany. Under Wrangel and Turenne, the allied Swedish and French armies marched and fought in Bavaria and Württemberg. After the end of the Thirty Years' War in 1648, he was made Governor-General of Swedish Pomerania. Queen Christina of Sweden created him count of Salmis in Kexholms län (Salmi and Suistamo pogosta, Käkisalmi province) in northern Karelia, Finland, and he later augmented his lands with Barony of Lindeberg, in Halland.

=== Under King Charles X Gustav ===
Wrangel on horseback, 1652. Klöcker Ehrenstrahl. Skokloster Castle.

Before Christina's abdication, Wrangel was already a close friend and trusted advisor of her successor, King Charles X Gustav of Sweden. Wrangel and Charles X Gustav had first met two weeks before the Battle of Leipzig (1642), and when Wrangel's oldest daughter was born during the siege, Charles X Gustav became her godparent. Charles X Gustav created Wrangel freiherr of Ludenhof and Lord High Admiral, a special favour since Charles X Gustav left most of Sweden's highest offices vacant.

When the Second Northern War broke out in 1655, Wrangel commanded a fleet, but in 1656, he was serving on land again and commanding, along with "Great Elector" Frederick William I of Brandenburg in the three-day Battle of Warsaw (1656). In 1657, he successfully assaulted Lehe sconce and Bützfleth redoubt and later invaded Jutland, and in 1658, he passed over the ice into the islands and took Kronborg. Later in 1658, Wrangel commanded the Swedish fleet at the Battle of the Sound, where it was defeated by a Dutch fleet sent to relieve the siege of Copenhagen. In 1659, Wrangel conquered Langeland. In May, he initially led a Swedish siege of Nakskov, but was replaced by Gustaf Otto Stenbock to defend Funen. It was on this island where he successfully defended from a landing attempt on 26 June. During the siege of Stettin in 1659, he sent reinforcements to the Swedish garrison.

When Charles X Gustav died at the end of the war, Wrangel participated in organising the obsequies and composed the melody to a lament. Also in 1660, Wrangel became chancellor of the University of Greifswald; he had been made supreme judge in Uppland Province two years earlier.

== Under King Charles XI ==
In 1664, he was appointed Lord High Constable of the Realm, and as such, he was a member of the Privy Council during the minority of King Charles XI of Sweden. During the Wars for Bremen, he tried to win the city of Bremen for the Swedish crown but was not successful. On 15 November 1666, he was forced to make peace and concluded the Treaty of Habenhausen. During the Scanian War, Wrangel's deteriorating health affected his ability to command, and he was recalled following the Swedish defeat at the Battle of Fehrbellin in 1675. Although Wrangel was commander-in-chief, his serious illness prevented him from personally directing the battle. Command had been delegated to his less experienced stepbrother, Baron Waldemar von Wrangel (1641–1675).

== Illness and death ==
The hardships and injuries that Wrangel suffered during his multiple campaigns, combined with unhealthy eating habits, led to Wrangel suffering from several acute and chronic illnesses for most of his life, most notably gout and gallstone. He was treated at several health resorts, including Spa in August 1651, Langenschwalbach in July 1662 and Pyrmont in the summer of 1668 but without ever completely recovering. In 1674, he broke down "like dead" from two strikes of hypervolemia, and his chronic diseases made it nearly impossible for him to fulfill the tasks of commanding the Swedish forces in the Scanian War.

Shortly afterwards, on 25 June (OS) or 5 July (NS) 1676, Wrangel died in his Spyker Castle on Rügen, Swedish Pomerania (also spelled Spycker, now part of Glowe Municipality). His body was transferred to Stralsund and remained there throughout the siege of 1678. After the battle, Stralsund fell into Danish and Brandenburgian hands, but the Danish king and the Brandenburgian elector, upon requests of Wrangel's heirs, permitted the body to be transferred to Stockholm, which happened in July 1680. On 1 December 1680, he was buried in the Wrangel family's crypt in Skokloster.

== Legacy ==
=== Historical assessments ===
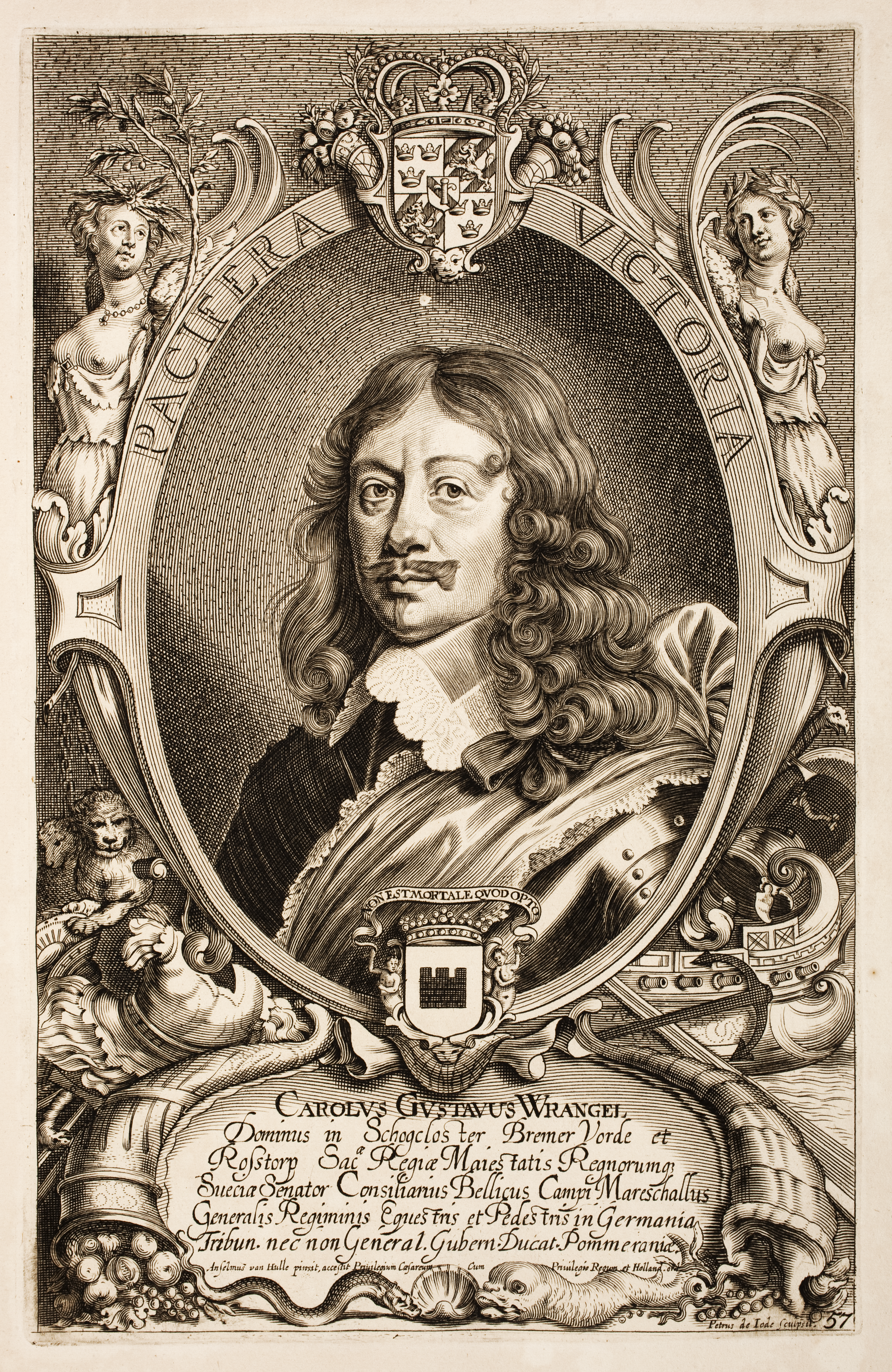
Engraving of Carl Gustaf Wrangel

Wrangel has been described by the Danish encyclopedia Lex as one of Sweden's most capable military officers during the Swedish Empire era. Encyclopædia Britannica characterizes him as an able strategist, particularly in his operations alongside the French marshal Turenne. His military career was distinguished by successes in both land and naval warfare, including the victory at the Battle of Fehmarn in 1644 and his command of Swedish forces in Germany during the final years of the Thirty Years' War. The 1906 Svenskt biografiskt handlexikon assessed his achievements as less distinguished than those of Johan Banér and Lennart Torstensson, while acknowledging that his campaigns had upheld Sweden's military reputation.

Wrangel's military achievements earned him recognition beyond Sweden during his lifetime. His campaigns were celebrated in German poetry and music, and in 1649 he was admitted to the literary society Fruchtbringende Gesellschaft under the name "The Victor". According to art historian Arne Losman, Wrangel also actively cultivated his public image as a military hero. He supported the publication of the fifth volume of Theatrum Europaeum in 1647, which featured his portrait and accounts of his military victories.

Wrangel's political standing was reflected in his appointment as Lord High Constable of Sweden in 1664. Historian Joakim Scherp describes him as a highly regarded candidate whose appointment was quickly approved by the Riksdag of the Estates. His administrative record, however, received criticism in the 1906 Svenskt biografiskt handlexikon, which characterized his influence in the Privy Council of Sweden as limited and criticized his management of the War College.

=== Landowner and builder ===
In Swedish Pomerania, Wrangel advanced to become the greatest landowner and held the domains of Spyker (Rügen) with Baldereck, Cape Arkona, Klein Jasmund (now part of Dubnitz, Sassnitz), Koosdorf, Polkvitz, Ruschvitz, Streu and Wostevitz, the former property of the Roskilde bishop, centred on Ralswiek (Rügen), Wrangelsburg with Krebsow, Spandowerhagen and Zarnitz, Groß Ernsthof, Pritzier with Buddenhagen, Giesekenhagen, Hohendorf, Hohensee, Katzow, Netzeband and Zarnow, Nonnendorf with Latzow, Lubmin and Vierow, Mölschow (Usedom) with Bannemin, Mahlzow, Sauzin, Zecherin and Ziemitz, Brüssow and Krummin (Usedom), and also the islands Greifswalder Oie and Ruden. Wrangel's Amt Saatzig, in Farther Pomerania, was exchanged for the already-mentioned Klein Jasmund, Polkvitz, Rushvitz and Wostevitz in 1653, when Farther Pomerania fell to Brandenburg.

In Swedish Livonia, Wrangel held the domains of Ödenpäh, Rappin and Wrangelshof, with Ödenpäh and Wrangelshof being exchanged for Pomeranian domains in 1653. Also in Livonia, he held Luua (then Ludenhof or Luhde castle in Walk (Valga) county). In Scania he held Lillö. Near Stockholm, he held Ekebyhov, and in Karelia, he held Salmis county, which he exchanged for Sölvesborg County in Blekinge in 1665. In Finland, he held property in Bjärnå as well as in Skokloster in Uppland, and Rostorp and Säby in Småland. In Halland, Wrangel held the county of Lindeberg. In Bremen-Verden, he held Amt Bremervörde.

Wrangel built Gripenberg Palace in Säby, and palaces in Bremervörde, Skokloster, Spyker, Stralsund, Wrangelsburg. Wrangelsburg bears his name since it was renamed by him from "Vorwerk" on 19 September 1653. His favourite and grandest castle was Skokloster Castle, in Uppland, in which he created substantial collections of art and expensive weapons and exotic items.

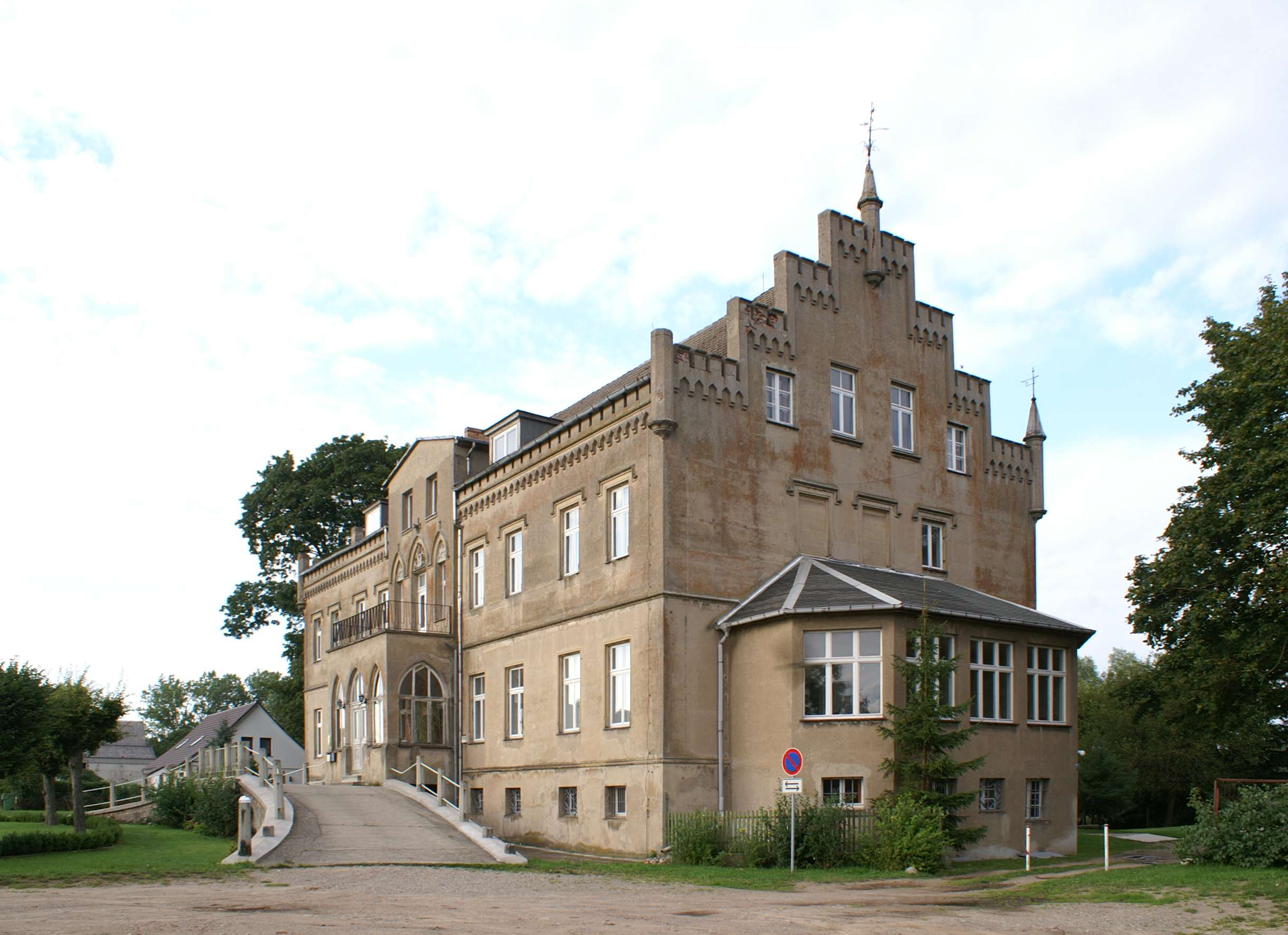
Wrangelsburg Palace

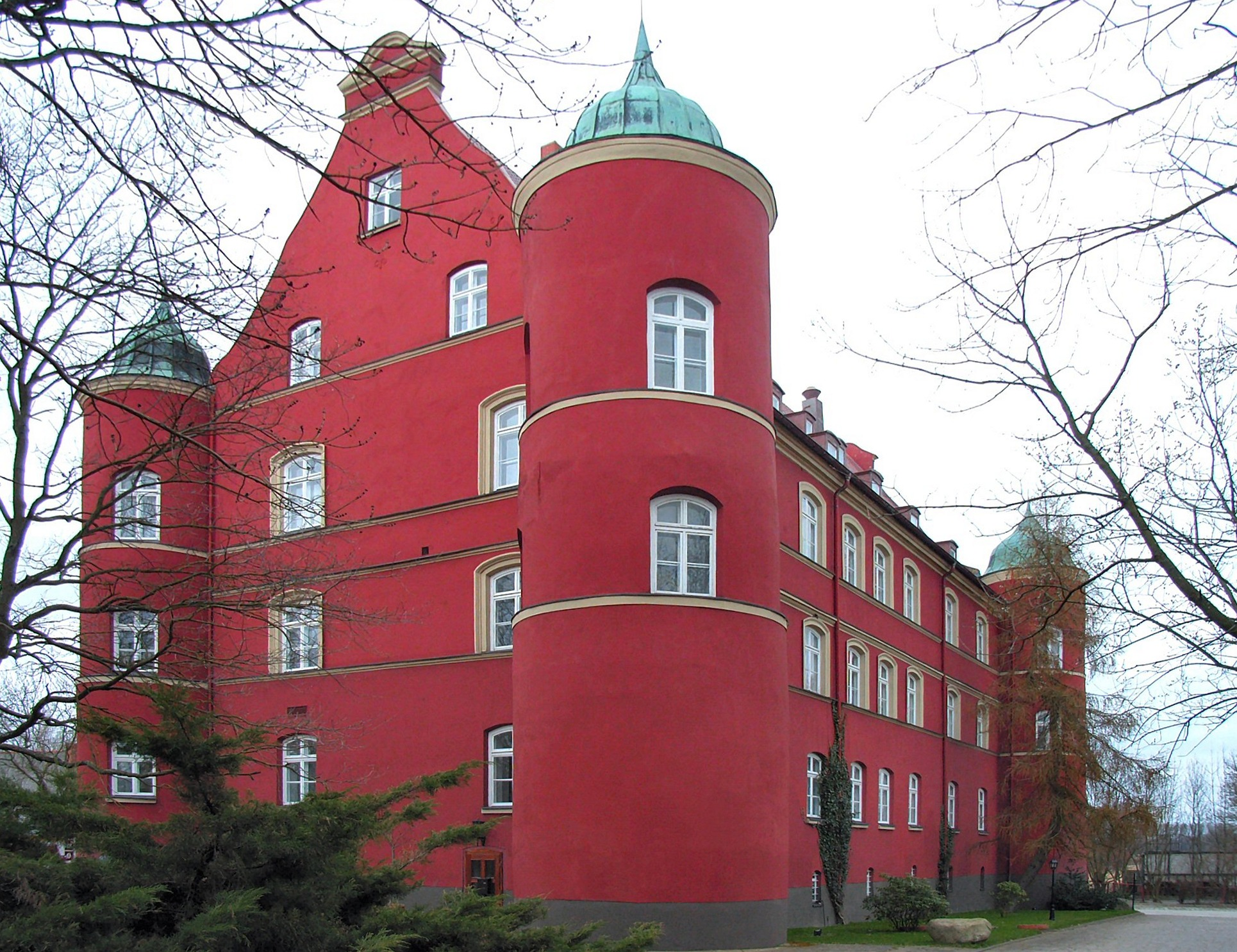
Spyker Castle

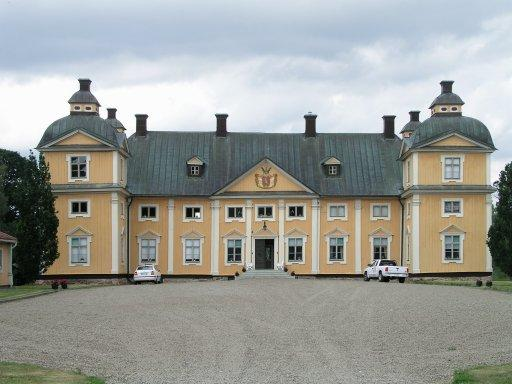
Gripenberg Castle

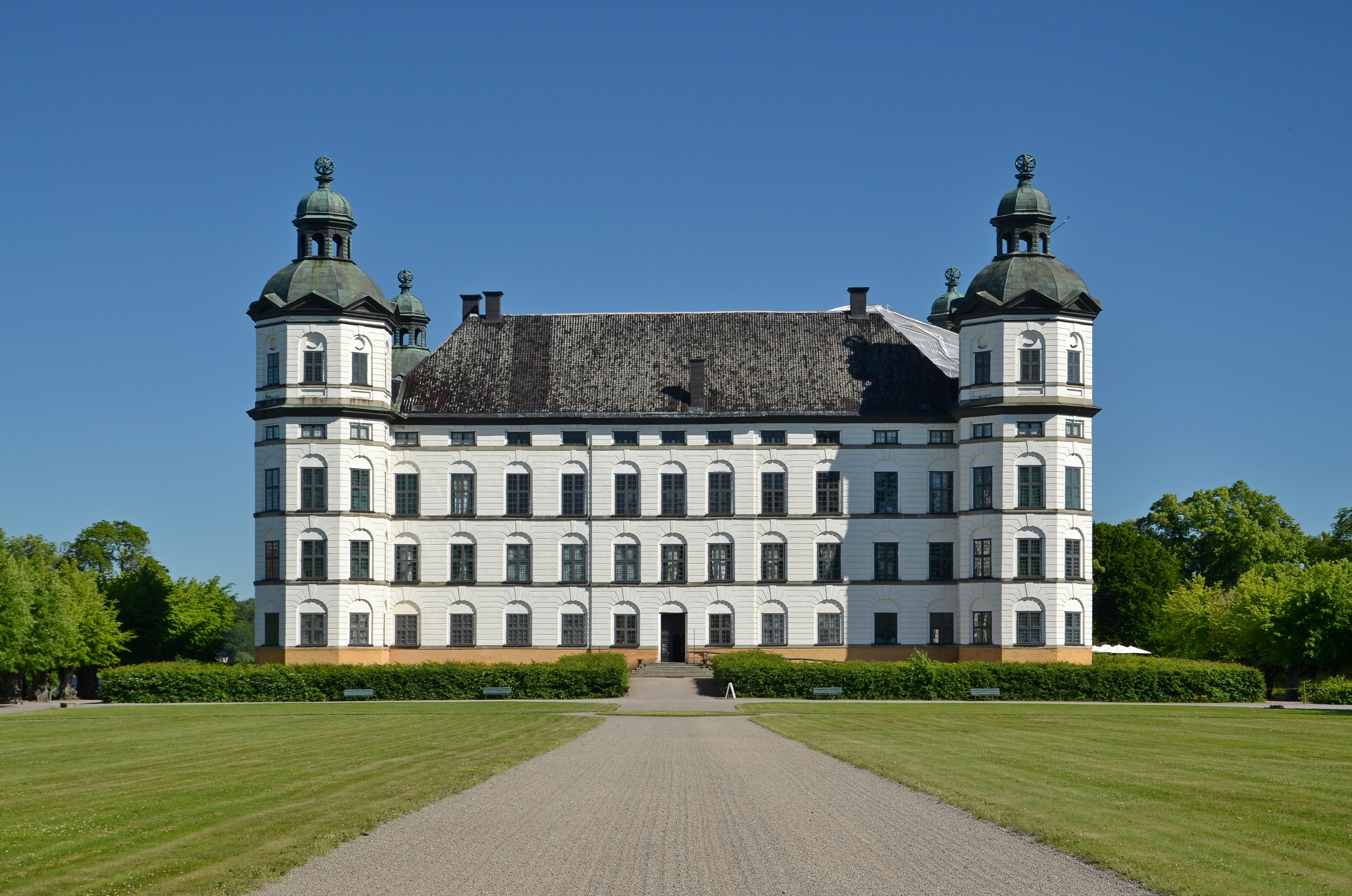
Skokloster Castle

== Sources ==
- Asmus, Ivo (2003). "Das Testament des Grafen. Die pommerschen Besitzungen Carl Gustav Wrangels nach Tod, förmyndarräfst und Reduktion". In Asmus, Ivo; Droste, Heiko; Olesen, Jens E. (eds.). Gemeinsame Bekannte: Schweden und Deutschland in der Frühen Neuzeit (in German). Berlin-Hamburg-Münster: LIT Verlag. ISBN 3-8258-7150-9.
- Asmus, Ivo; Tenhaef, Peter (2006). "Die Trauerfeier an der Universität Greifswald am 11. Mai 1660 für Karl X. Gustav von Schweden. Historische und rhetorische Aspekte". In Walter Baumgartner (ed.). Ostsee-Barock. Texte und Kultur. Nordische Geschichte (in German). Vol. 4. Berlin: LIT Verlag. pp. 59–84. ISBN 3-8258-9987-X.
- Wartenberg, Heiko (2008). Archivführer zur Geschichte Pommerns bis 1945. Schriften des Bundesinstituts für Kultur und Geschichte der Deutschen im Östlichen Europa. Vol. 33. Oldenbourg Wissenschaftsverlag. ISBN 978-3-486-58540-7.
- Bonnesen, Sten [in Swedish] (1924). Karl X Gustav [Charles X Gustav] (in Swedish). Gleerups.
- Barkman, Bertil C:son; Lundkvist, Sven; Tersmeden, Lars (1966). Kungl. Svea livgardes historia: 1632(1611)-1660 [History of the Royal Swedish Life Guards: 1632(1611)-1660] (in Swedish). Vol. 3:2. Stockholm: Stift. för Svea livgardes historia.
- von Essen, Michael Fredholm (2023). The Danish Wars, 1657-1660. Charles X's Wars. Vol. 3. Helion & Company. ISBN 9781915113603.
- Munthe, Arnold (1910). Klas Fleming, Karl Gustaf Wrangel, Martin Thijsen Anckarhielm, danska kriget 1643—1645: Omfattande tiden från början af år 1645 till och med fredsslutet den 13 augusti. Svenska sjöhjältar (in Swedish). Vol. 5:3. Stockholm: P. A. Norstedt & Söners Förlag. OCLC 479751867.
