= Montecuccoli's landing on Funen =

1659 landing on Funen

- Part of the Dano-Swedish War (1658–1660)
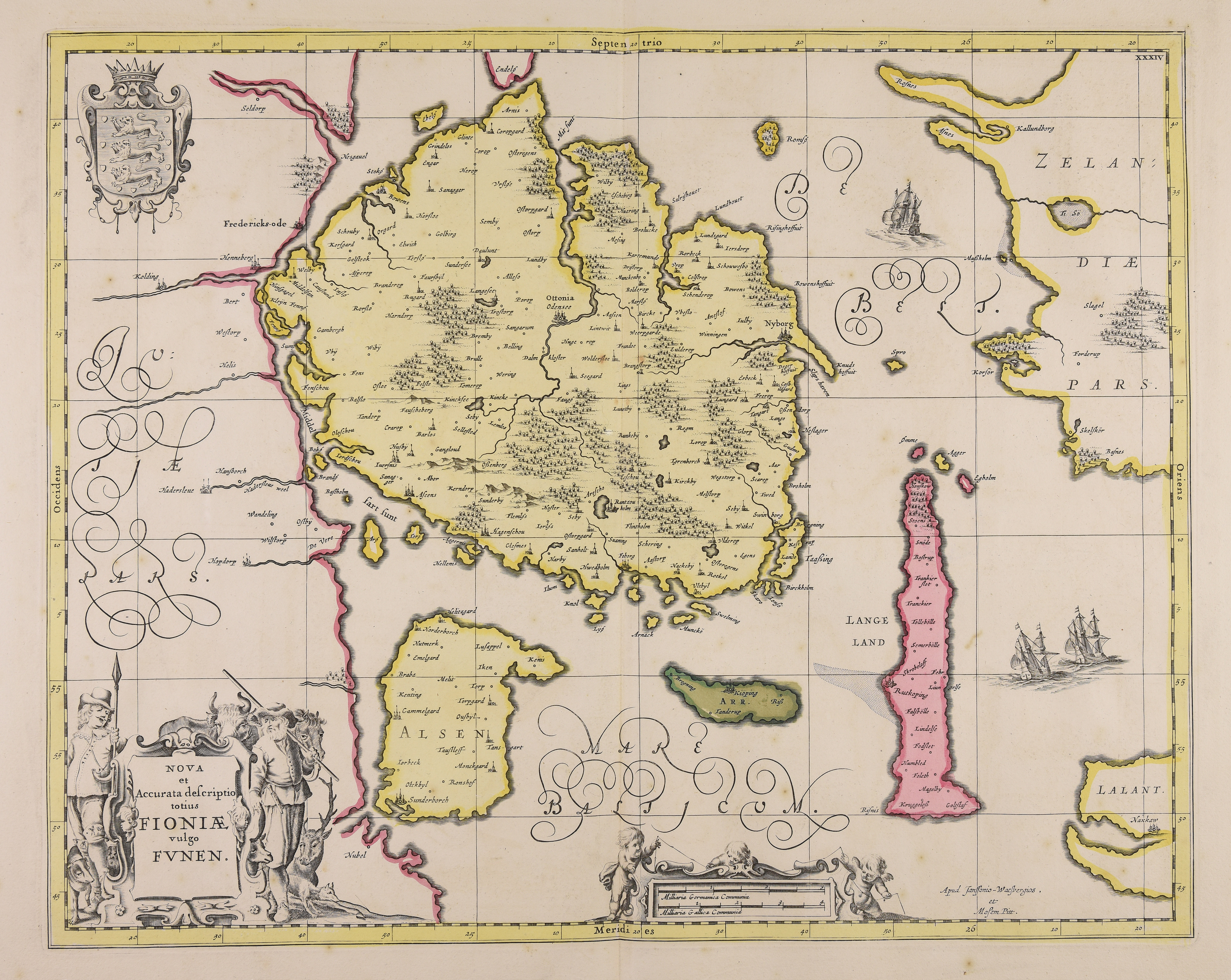
- Map of Funen from the National Library of France made in the 17th century
Date	26 June 1659 (4 hours)
Location	Funen, Denmark 55°21′N 10°21′E
Result	Swedish victory

Belligerents
(yes) Swedish Empire	Austria; Denmark–Norway; Dutch Republic

Commanders and leaders
(yes) Carl Gustaf Wrangel	Raimondo Montecuccoli (WIA)

Units involved
Unknown	Unknown

Strength
4,000 men	9,000 men 6 warships c. 60 smaller vessels

Casualties and losses
None	Heavy; 5 ships damaged Several smaller vessels sunk

Montecuccoli's landing on Funen occurred on 26 June 1659 when an allied force, consisting of six Dutch ships and 9,000 troops, attempted to land on Swedish-occupied Funen. The Dutch ships initially bombarded the Swedish positions and the Allied troops managed to land unopposed. These were later repulsed by the 4,000 Swedish troops under the command of Carl Gustaf Wrangel. The allies suffered heavy casualties with 5 of the Dutch warships being damaged.

== Background ==
After the capture of Fredriksodde in 1659, all of Jutland was under the control of the anti-Swedish coalition. However, they would not stay for long as their goal was to go to Copenhagen, and they assembled a force of 9,000 men at Stenderup in southern Jutland to land on Funen. Before doing so, they captured the island of Fanö to defend their flank.

== Landing ==
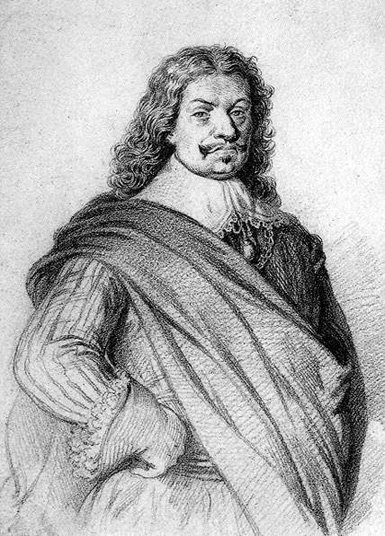
Portrait of Raimondo Montecuccoli from the 17th century

On 26 June, the allies shipped over their troops under the command of Raimondo Montecuccoli on around 60 boats, which were defended by six Dutch warships. After bombarding what they believed to be the Swedish positions on the island, the allies landed without any resistance at Middelfart. Carl Gustaf Wrangel, who led the some 4,000 Swedish troops present on the island, had pulled his troops away from the bombardment area and soon bombarded the advancing Danes once they had made it further up on the beach. The nearby Dutch Admiral ship that was supporting the landing was severely damaged. Additionally, the transport fleet had earlier been disrupted by storms and several boats had been driven towards the coast and soon sunk by the Swedes. The affair lasted around 4 hours.

== Aftermath ==
After the failed landing, the Swedes hadn't suffered any casualties, while the allies had suffered heavy casualties. Additionally, five of the six Dutch ships were more or less damaged, and Montecuccoli had been wounded by flying shrapnel.

The Elector of Brandenburg, Frederick William, now suggested attacking Funen with three assault groups. One would attack from Stenderup, the other from Fredriksodde, and the third from Ebeltoft. These plans were later thwarted in the battle of Ebeltoft.

== See also ==
- Invasion of Als (1658) – 1658 Polish–Brandenburgian invasion of Als
- Swedish conquest of Langeland (1659) – 1659 Swedish invasion of Langeland
- Battle of Nyborg – Battle in the Second Northern War

== Works cited ==
- Isacson, Claes-Göran [in Swedish] (2015). Karl X Gustavs krig: Fälttågen i Polen, Tyskland, Baltikum, Danmark och Sverige 1655-1660 [Wars of Charles X Gustav: The campaigns in Poland, Germany, the Baltics, Denmark and Sweden 1655-1660] (in Swedish). Historiska Media. ISBN 9789175450117.
- Bonnesen, Sten [in Swedish] (1924). Karl X Gustav [Charles X Gustav] (in Swedish). Gleerups.
