= Invasion of Als (1658) =

1658 Polish–Brandenburgian invasion of Als

- Part of the Dano-Swedish War (1658–1660)
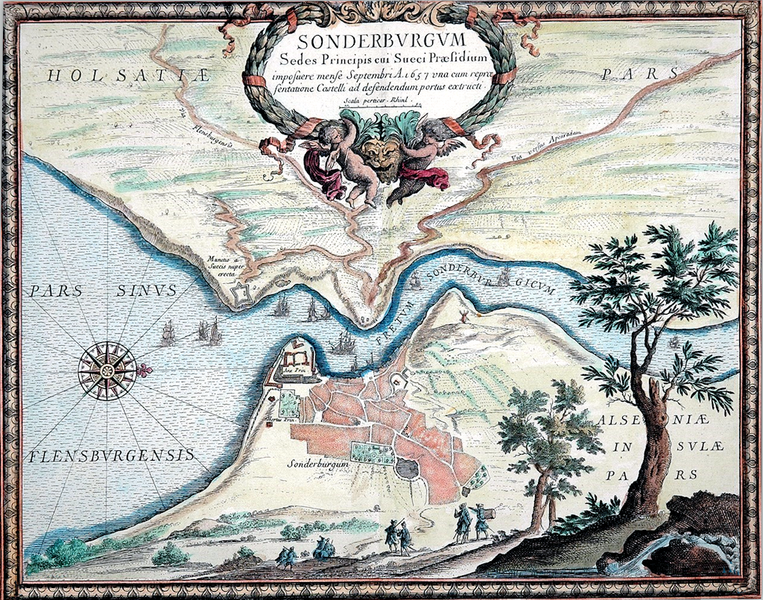
- Map of Sønderborg and its surroundings by Erik Dahlbergh
Date	4–8 December 1658 (O.S.); 14–18 December 1658 (N.S.)
Location	Als, Denmark 54°59′N 09°55′E
Result	Allied victory
Territorial changes	Als reconquered from Sweden

Belligerents
Brandenburg; Denmark–Norway; Polish–Lithuanian Commonwealth	(yes) Swedish Empire

Commanders and leaders
Frederick William; Peter Bredal †	(yes) Rutger von Ascheberg (yes) Claes Uggla

Units involved
One Danish squadron	(yes) Ascheberg's regiment (yes) Sønderborg garrison (yes) Der Strauss

Strength
Initially; 700–800 cavalry Later; 4,000 men 6 ships	1,600 men 4–13 ships

Casualties and losses
Unknown	2 wounded

The invasion of Als occurred from 4 to 8 December (O.S.) / 14 to 18 December (N.S.) 1658 during the Dano-Swedish War of 1658–1660 when a Brandenburgian army under the command of Frederick William landed on the island. Initially trying to repel the army, Rutger von Ascheberg was forced to withdraw into Sønderborg Castle which was soon besieged. On 6 December, Major Claes Uggla arrived off the island, managing to evacuate the castle's garrison on 8 December while only sustaining 2 wounded.

== Background ==
When Charles X Gustav landed on Zealand and occupied it during the first stages of his second Danish war, the Dutch Republic, Brandenburg, the Polish–Lithuanian Commonwealth, and Austria all decided to attack the Swedes in support for Denmark. In early September of 1658, the allies assembled an army at Parchim, under the commands of Stefan Czarniecki, Frederick William, and Raimondo Montecuccoli. It consisted of 30,000–32,000 men in total: 5,000 Poles, 16,000 Brandenburgians, and 11,000 Austrians. The army marched into Holstein on 17 September, and after a few skirmishes with Philip of Sulzbach, the Swedes were forced to retreat.

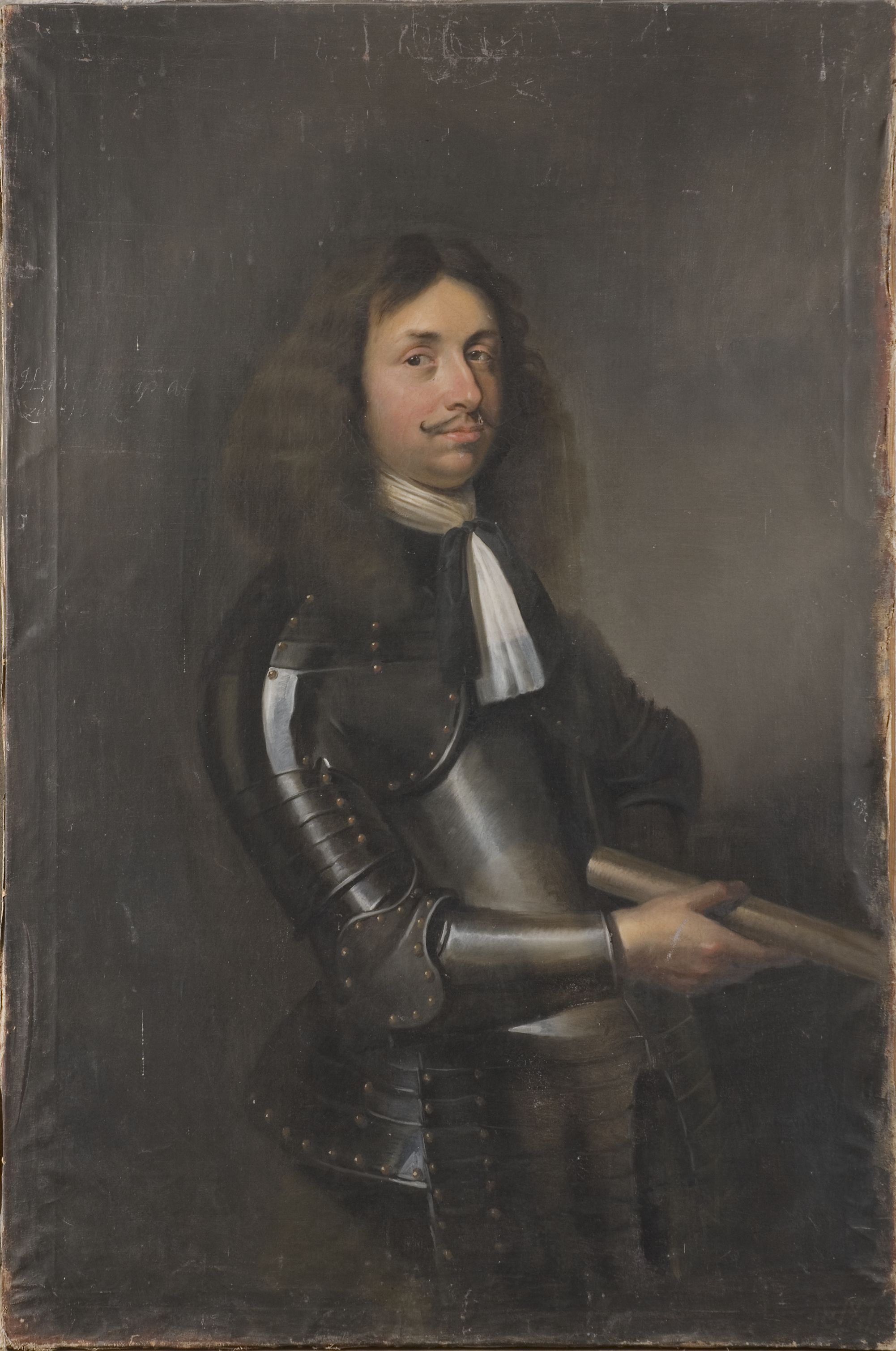
Portrait of Philip of Sulzbach by Abraham Wuchters

In late September, the Allies reached Hamburg, and Sulzbach retreated to Sønderborg on Als. The allies eventually arrived to the island in October, and after realizing he could not stop the army, he retreated to Fredriksodde. Before departing, he left a force of 1,600 men and appointed Rutger von Ascheberg as commander on the island to defend it. Ascheberg's own regiment was also present on the island. Ascheberg was ordered to continuously patrol the island's shores and a supply depot for a one month-long siege was left in Sønderborg Castle.

=== Prelude ===
In November, reports on the allies' movements became increasingly alarming. Ascheberg had the ship Der Strauss at his disposal, which was used to patrol between Als and the mainland, additionally to send messages to king Charles X Gustav on Funen. Philip of Sulzbach promptly sent reinforcements in gunpowder and soldiers to Ascheberg.

The Swedish situation turned more precarious as the Dutch fleet entered Danish waters. On 1 November, Philip reported that the Dutch fleet had forced its way through the strait and believed it would soon threaten the Swedish positions. 14 days later, a Dano–Dutch squadron came to Jutland's coast near Als, and an Allied landing on the island was inevitable.

After discussions with Carl Gustaf Wrangel, Wrangel believed it would be best if Ascheberg waited until the sea froze over thus enabling him to march across the ice to Funen. In late November, Ascheberg reported that the allies were preparing to attack Als and Wrangel issued instructions for its defense.

== Invasion ==
On 3 December, the Allies began bombarding Als, and the next morning, a force of 700–800 Polish and Brandenburgian cavalry landed on the island. They met tough resistance, with Ascheberg trying to repel them in vain. The Danes sent six ships that began engaging the Swedish positions. Soon, Frederick's artillery closed in and the Swedish forces were subjected to continuous and heavy fire. After having captured Sønderborg, Frederick attacked Als from across the sound with 4,000 men.

After this, Ascheberg was forced into Sønderborg Castle after three skirmishes due to only having six companies of cavalry and four companies of dragoons, and the Brandenburgians quickly besieged it, being supported by a small Danish naval squadron. The Swedes were offered terms for surrender, but they were quickly rejected. This squadron was in turn subjected to Swedish return fire which killed Admiral Peter Bredal. Sønderborg Castle was lacking everything, such as gunpowder, manpower, and provisions. The castle continued daily and the garrison suffered from the cold. After Ascheberg sent pleas for help, Wrangel or Charles X Gustav sent Admiral Claes Uggla to the island with 4–13 ships. On 6 December, Uggla reached the castle. On the following night, he met with Ascheberg, agreeing that Uggla would dock his smaller vessels by the castle wall, and Ascheberg would create a hole in the wall on the next day.

On 8 December which withdrew with the entire Swedish force under heavy artillery fire through three points in the wall. The women, children, and baggage train were sent out first, then the cavalrymen, and then the dragoons. During the withdrawal, those remaining continued bombarding the besiegers with heavy fire, along with at least three sorties. Frederick William was so impressed by the Swedish defense that he sent a trumpeter, a Colonel, and another officer to offer Ascheberg free passage for all of his officers if they surrendered. However, Ascheberg would not be let go. If Ascheberg refused the offer, Frederick would instead hand him and his officers over to the Poles. Ascheberg in response replied:

I thank the Elector for his grace, but I am confident that His Highness, as a swift and brave gentleman, can do nothing but show mercy to a brave man and disdain for a wretch. And since I have sworn an oath to serve my king with all loyalty as long as I live, I have the hope that His Highness will think better of me than to ask what I cannot agree to. As for the Poles, I have the honor of knowing them beforehand; and therefore my fear of them is very tolerable. However, I will have the honor of giving my final answer tomorrow or the day after.

In the morning, Ascheberg finally boarded a ship with his officers. When the allies realized the Swedes had departed, they began firing on them, but only managed to wound two men. Uggla soon managed to make it to Faaborg where Ascheberg landed two days later.

== Aftermath ==
Soon after the invasion of Als, Holstein and Schleswig were taken by the allies, and the Duke of Holstein had to pay a large sum of money for his neutrality. The successful Swedish evacuation of Sønderborg was a blow to the Danes, but a small consolation for the allies was that Nordborg was forced to surrender.

== See also ==
- Swedish conquest of Langeland (1659) – 1659 Swedish invasion of Langeland

== Works cited ==
- Isacson, Claes-Göran [in Swedish] (2015). Karl X Gustavs krig: Fälttågen i Polen, Tyskland, Baltikum, Danmark och Sverige 1655-1660 [Wars of Charles X Gustav: The campaigns in Poland, Germany, the Baltics, Denmark and Sweden 1655-1660] (in Swedish). Historiska Media. pp. 146–155. ISBN 9789175450117.
- Grimberg, Carl Gustaf; Uddgren, Hugo Edvard [in Swedish] (1914). Svenska krigarbragder [Swedish military exploits] (in Swedish). P.A. Norstedt & Söner.
- Åberg, Alf [in Swedish] (1950). Rutger von Ascheberg: fältmarskalk och generalguvernör [Rutger von Ascheberg: Field Marshal and Governor General] (in Swedish). Gleerups.
- Uddgren, H. E. (1920). "Rutger Ascheberg, von". sok.riksarkivet.se. National Archives of Sweden.
- Starbäck, Carl Georg [in Swedish]; Bäckström, Per Olof [in Swedish] (1886). Carl X Gustaf. Carl XI [Charles X Gustaf. Charles XI]. Berättelser ur svenska historien (in Swedish). Vol. 7. Stockholm: F. & G. Beijers förlag.
- von Essen, Michael Fredholm (2023). The Danish Wars, 1657-1660. Charles X's Wars. Vol. 3. Helion & Company. ISBN 9781915113603.
