= Kleiner Rohrplan =

- Interactive map of Kleiner Rohrplan

Geography
- Location: Baltic Sea
- Coordinates: 54.081314°N 13.803387°E
- Length: 0.640 km (0.3977 mi)
- Width: 0.140 km (0.087 mi)

Administration
- DE-MV

Demographics
- Population: 0

The Kleine Rohrplan near Zecherin is a Baltic Sea island in the northern part of the Peenestrom strait. It is located north of the district of Zecherin, less than 60 metres from the island of Usedom, in the municipality of Mölschow. In a north–south direction, the Rohrplan is over 640 metres long, and its greatest width is more than 140 metres.

The island was used as pastureland for centuries. Reedbeds spread across the entire area after use ceased in the second half of the 20th century.

== Literature ==
- Dietrich Sellin: Zur Vogelwelt des Naturschutzgebietes "Großer Wotig" und des angrenzenden Gebietes. In: Ornithologischer Rundbrief Mecklenburg-Vorpommern. Issue 37, 1995, pp. 33f. (digital copy, pdf: 3 MB)
