= Claes Uggla =

Swedish military officer (1614–1676)

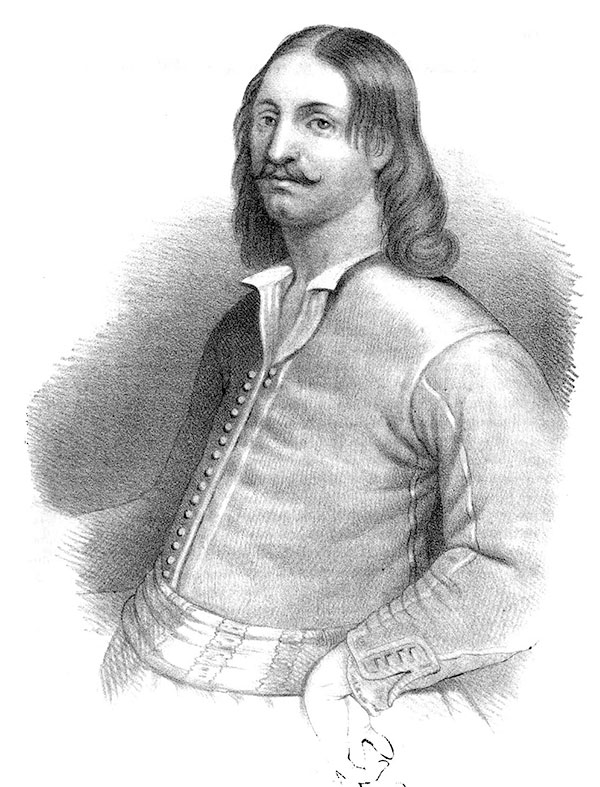
- Born: Claes Johansson Uggla; 1614; Afverstad, Värmland, Sweden
- Died: 1 June 1676 (aged 61–62) off the east coast of Öland, Sweden
- Military career
- Allegiance: Sweden
- Branch: Swedish Army; Swedish Navy
- Service years: 1643–1676
- Rank: Admiral
- Conflicts: Torstenson War; Thirty Years' War; Second Northern War; Dano-Swedish War (1657–1658); Dano-Swedish War (1658–1660); Invasion of Als (1658); Scanian War †

Claes (Note: Also written as Claas, Clas or Klas.) Johansson Uggla (1614 – 1 June 1676) was a Swedish military officer of the 17th century, who served in both the army and the navy, reaching the rank of admiral before he was killed in action during the naval Battle of Öland.

== Biography ==
Uggla was born in the village of Afverstad in Ölserud parish, Värmland, the son of Colonel Johan Uggla and Margareta Gyllenmärs. As a young man he was a page at the royal court. During the Torstenson War of 1643-1645 he served as a volunteer in the navy, seeing action in the fleet under the command of Clas Fleming. From 1646 Uggla served in the Swedish army. He distinguished himself at the Battle of Prague in 1648, and was promoted to captain lieutenant. In 1650, he was promoted to captain in the Life Guards, accompanying Charles X during the Second Northern War. When the Dano-Swedish War broke out in 1657 Uggla returned to naval service. He was promoted to major and in November 1658 participated in the Battle of the Sound against the Dutch fleet. In December, he successfully evacuated the Swedes from Sønderborg Castle during its siege. In 1660, he was promoted to lieutenant admiral. During a three-year stay in Lübeck, he oversaw the construction of warships being built for the Swedish Navy. In 1670 he was promoted to admiral, and in 1676 was elevated to the status of Friherre. When further conflict broke out in 1675 in the Scanian War, Uggla was given command of a squadron under Generalamiral Lorentz Creutz.

=== Battle of Öland ===
On 1 June 1676, during the Battle of Öland, against the allied Danish and Dutch fleets under Niels Juel and Cornelis Tromp, Creutz's flagship Kronan capsized, as a result of intemperately turning hard south, even though under full sail with open cannon ports. The Swedish fleet's line of battle was thrown into confusion, and the enemy, taking advantage of the situation, surrounded Uggla's 94-gun flagship Svärdet. He found himself attacked by four enemy vessels simultaneously, including both the Danish and Dutch flagships. After a fierce battle lasting two hours Uggla's ship was dismasted and holed below the waterline. Uggla finally surrendered to Tromp, but a Dutch fire ship failed to recognize that the ship had surrendered and attacked, and Uggla was killed when his ship blew up. Only 51 of the 670 crew survived.

== See also ==
- HSwMS Claes Uggla - Swedish torpedo cruiser, 1900–1917
