= Karlshagen =

- Municipality
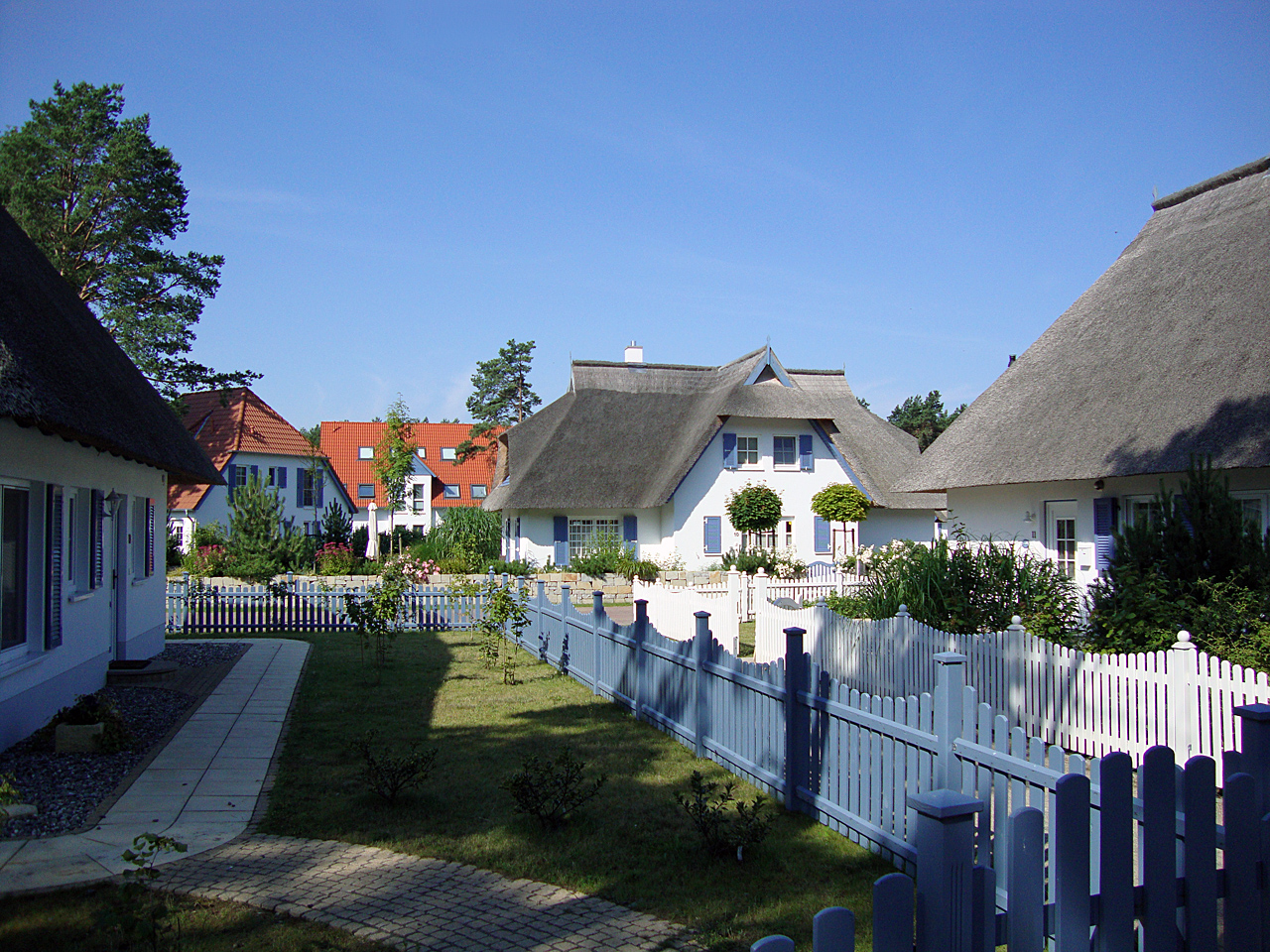
- Houses with typical thatched roofs in Karlshagen (Reed houses)

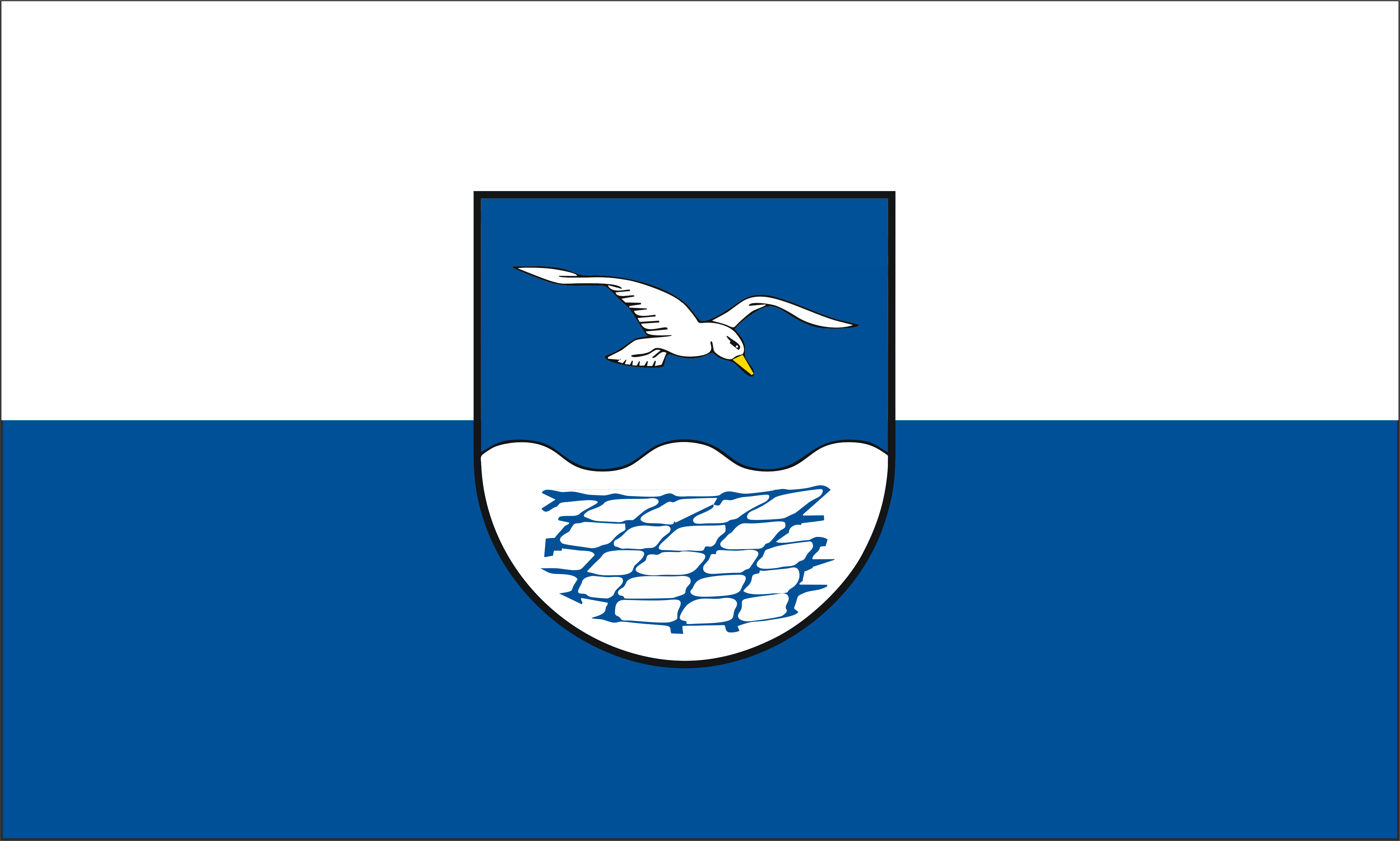
- Flag Coat of arms

- Location of Karlshagen within Vorpommern-Greifswald district
- Interactive map of Karlshagen
- Location within Germany Location within Mecklenburg-Vorpommern
- Coordinates: 54°07′N 13°49′E
- Country: Germany
- State: Mecklenburg-Vorpommern
- District: Vorpommern-Greifswald
- Municipal assoc.: Usedom-Nord

Government
  - Mayor: Christian Höhn

Area
  - Total: 5.07 km^{2} (1.96 sq mi)
- Elevation: 3 m (9.8 ft)

Population (2025-12-31)
  - Total: 3,046
  - Density: 601/km^{2} (1,560/sq mi)
- Time zone: UTC+01:00 (CET)
  - Summer (DST): UTC+02:00 (CEST)
- Postal codes: 17449
- Dialling codes: 038371
- Vehicle registration: VG
- Website: www.karlshagen.de

Karlshagen is a Baltic Sea resort in Western Pomerania in the north of the island Usedom, in north-eastern Germany. Karlshagen has 3,400 inhabitants and lies between Zinnowitz and Peenemünde.

== History ==
In 1885, a pier was developed in Karlshagen. Today it is the most important yachting port of Usedom.

Between 1939 and 1945, Karlshagen lay in the restricted area of the army laboratory Peenemünde Army Research Center. During World War II, the Germans operated two subcamps of the Ravensbrück concentration camp in Karlshagen, in which a total of some 2,400 men, mostly Soviet, Polish and French, were imprisoned and subjected to forced labour, and over 230 died. In February 1945, 10 Soviet prisoners stole a German bomber and escaped from the camp.

Karlshagen also was the location of the housing development for high-level personnel and scientists working in the nearby laboratory. Although the buildings were largely destroyed in the air raids of 1943/44, some parts are preserved. From 1949 to 1989, Karlshagen belonged to the German Democratic Republic. During this period, the area north of Karlshagen, including the village Peenemuende, was a restricted-access area.

The 75-metre-high pylons of a three-phase 110 kV alternating current overhead line running between Peenemuende and Karlshagen are visible for a considerable distance. This line was built in the early 1950s, in order to transport the electrical power generated on the island to the mainland, as it was no longer needed in Usedom after the laboratory was shut down. Later, a branch line was established to the transformer station in Karlshagen. After the Peenemuende power plant was shut down in 1990, the branch of the overhead line to the plant was dismantled, so now only the Karlshagen transformer station is fed by the line running across the Peene.
