= Usedom-Nord =

Collective municipality in Mecklenburg-Vorpommern, Germany

- Amt
- Location of Usedom-Nord within Vorpommern-Greifswald district
- Interactive map of Usedom-Nord
- Location within Germany Location within Mecklenburg-Vorpommern
- Coordinates: 54°07′N 13°49′E
- Country: Germany
- State: Mecklenburg-Vorpommern
- District: Vorpommern-Greifswald
- Seat: Zinnowitz
- Subdivisions: 5 municipalities

Area
  - Total: 61.64 km^{2} (23.80 sq mi)

Population (2025-12-31)
  - Total: 9,223
  - Density: 149.6/km^{2} (387.5/sq mi)
- Time zone: UTC+01:00 (CET)
  - Summer (DST): UTC+02:00 (CEST)
- Website: www.amtusedomnord.de

Amt Usedom-Nord is a collective municipality in the district of Vorpommern-Greifswald, in Mecklenburg-Vorpommern, Germany. The seat of the Amt is in Zinnowitz.

The Amt Usedom-Nord consists of the following municipalities:

1. Karlshagen
2. Mölschow
3. Peenemünde
4. Trassenheide
5. Zinnowitz
