= Battle of Fehmarn (1659) =

Sea battle between a Dano-Dutch fleet and a Swedish fleet

Coordinates: 54.569693°N 11.430173°E

- Part of the Dano-Swedish War (1658–1660)
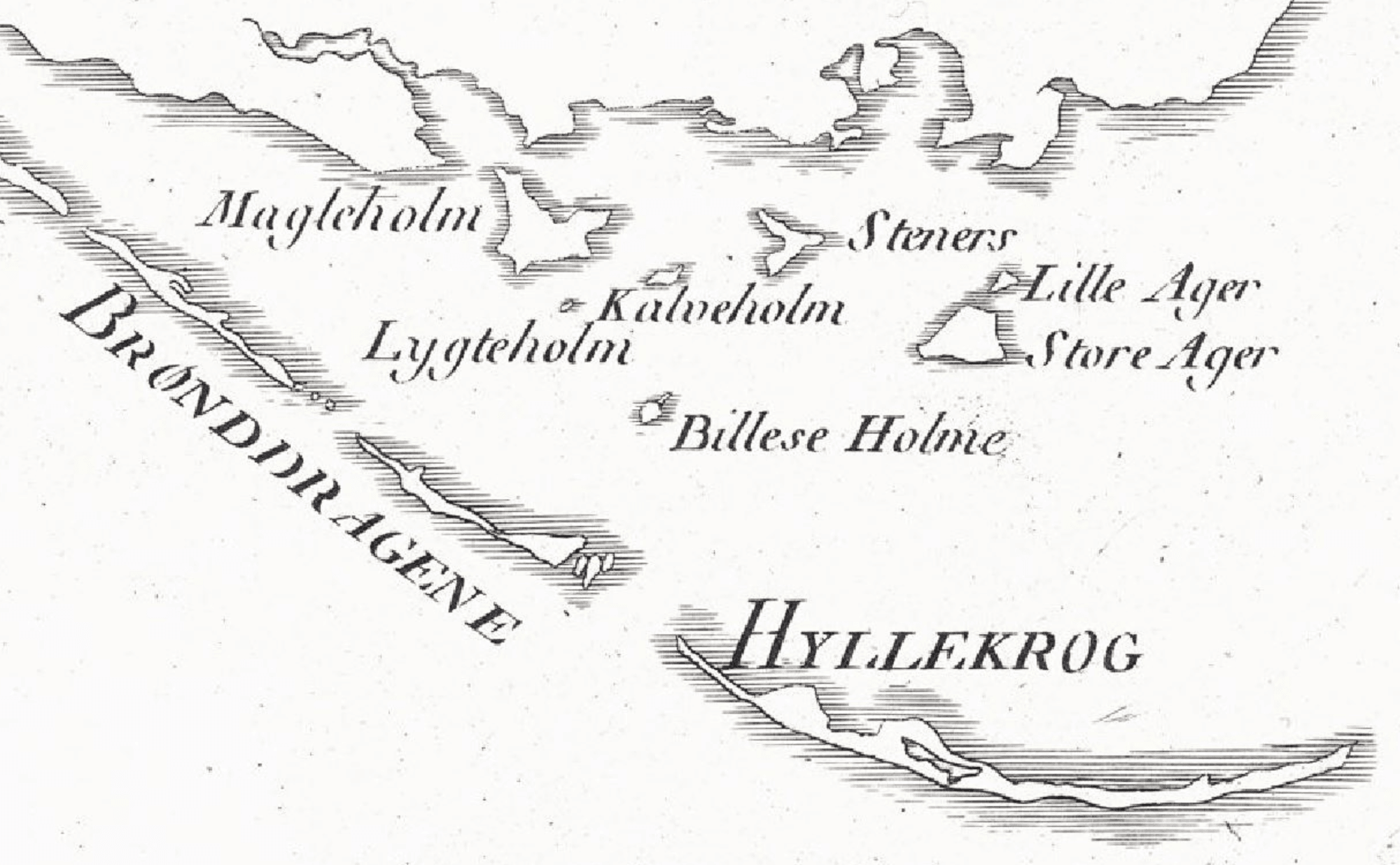
- Map of the Rødsand shoal
Date	30 April 1659
Location	Rødsand, Fehmarn Belt
Result	See aftermath
Territorial changes	Allied invasion of Funen

Belligerents
(yes) Swedish Empire	Dutch Republic; Denmark–Norway

Commanders and leaders
(Swedish Empire) Klas Hansson (WIA) (Swedish Empire) Carl Gustaf Wrangel	(Dutch Republic) Jacob Obdam (Denmark–Norway) Henrik Bielke (Denmark–Norway) Niels Juel

Units involved
Unknown	(Denmark–Norway) Trefoldigheden

Strength
20–24 warships 2 fireships Several galleons	22–26 warships Several galleons and transport ships

Casualties and losses
12 officers and men killed 26 wounded	At least 1 ship damaged

The battle of Fehmarn (Swedish: Sjöslaget vid Femern; Danish: Slaget ved Rødsand; Dutch: Zeeslag bij Fehmarn), also known as the battle of Rödsund, occurred on 30 April 1659 during the Dano-Swedish War of 1658–1660. It was fought in the Fehmarn Belt between a Swedish fleet under Klas Hansson Bjelkenstjerna and a Dano-Dutch fleet under Jacob van Wassenaer Obdam. The battle ended inconclusively.

== Background ==
Following the Battle of the Sound, Swedish forces had been driven out from Zealand, but continued to occupy the Island of Funen. Dano-Dutch forces under Jacob van Wassenaer Obdam, which were defending the Øresund strait, sailed downwind to meet the Swedish fleet in the Fehmarn Belt.

On 30 April 1659, a Swedish fleet under the command of Klas Hansson Bjelkenstjerna encountered its Dutch counterpart under Jacob van Wassenaer Obdam and the Danish one under Henrik Bielke between Fehrmarn and Lolland.

The Swedish fleet consisted of 20–24 warships, two fire ships, and some galleons, while the allied fleet consisted of three Danish warships and 19–23 Dutch warships, along with some galleons and transport ships. Bjelkenstjerna decided to attack the allied fleet despite being outnumbered and a weak crew due to starvation.

== Battle ==
Both sides maneuvered to get into their positions, and when they passed each other, they opened fire. The wind became so strong that neither side was able to open their gun ports. However, sufficient fire was able to be maintained from other decks. During the fighting, a six-pound cannonball hit Bjelkenstjerna in his hip, forcing him to withdraw to the stern, leading to Carl Gustaf Wrangel taking over command.

The two fleets continued passing by each other at close range, exchanging heavy cannon fire. The Swedes were able to hit several allied ships, particularly the Danish Trefoldigheden, with several of its sails being shot down, and making maneuvering it difficult. Opdam arrived with reinforcements, successfully preventing the damaged Trefoldigheden from further attacks.

The fleets turned once more, and the Swedes came into the wind, however, the harsh weather made it impossible to keep the fleet together for close combat, leading to Wrangel having to stay as still as possible and wait for the allied ships. The evening continued with continuous artillery fire, but when it became dark, Wrangel decided to withdraw in order to seek a harbour to assess the damage done to his ships. Opdam made the same decision, and the fleets separated. Wrangel's forces withdrew towards the northeast, and a small force remained near Copenhagen, however the majority of the fleet returned to Landskorna.

== Aftermath ==
The Swedish losses sustained during the battle were some 12 officers and men killed, with 26 wounded, and the size of the allied fleet remains unknown. According to some sources, the battle ended in a draw, while others claim it was tactically inconclusive but with a strategic outcome favoring the allies.

== Works cited ==
- Isacson, Claes-Göran (2015). Karl X Gustavs krig: Fälttågen i Polen, Tyskland, Baltikum, Danmark och Sverige 1655-1660 [Wars of Charles X Gustav: The campaigns in Poland, Germany, the Baltics, Denmark and Sweden 1655-1660] (in Swedish). Historiska Media. ISBN 9789175450117.
- Bäckström, Per Olof (1884). Svenska flottans historia [History of the Swedish fleet] (in Swedish). Stockholm: Norstedts förlag.
- Harding, Richard (2002). Seapower and Naval Warfare, 1650–1830. Taylor & Francis. ISBN 9781135364854.
- Essen, Michael (27 January 2023). Charles X's Wars: Volume 3 - The Danish Wars, 1657-1660. Helion & Company. ISBN 978-1915113603.
- Glete, Jan (2010). Swedish Naval Administration, 1521-1721. Brill. ISBN 9789047441519.
- Nordentoft, Johan (1937). Nakskov og Svenskerne 1658 og 1659 III (in Danish). C. A. REITZELS FORLAG.
