= Glowe =

- Municipality
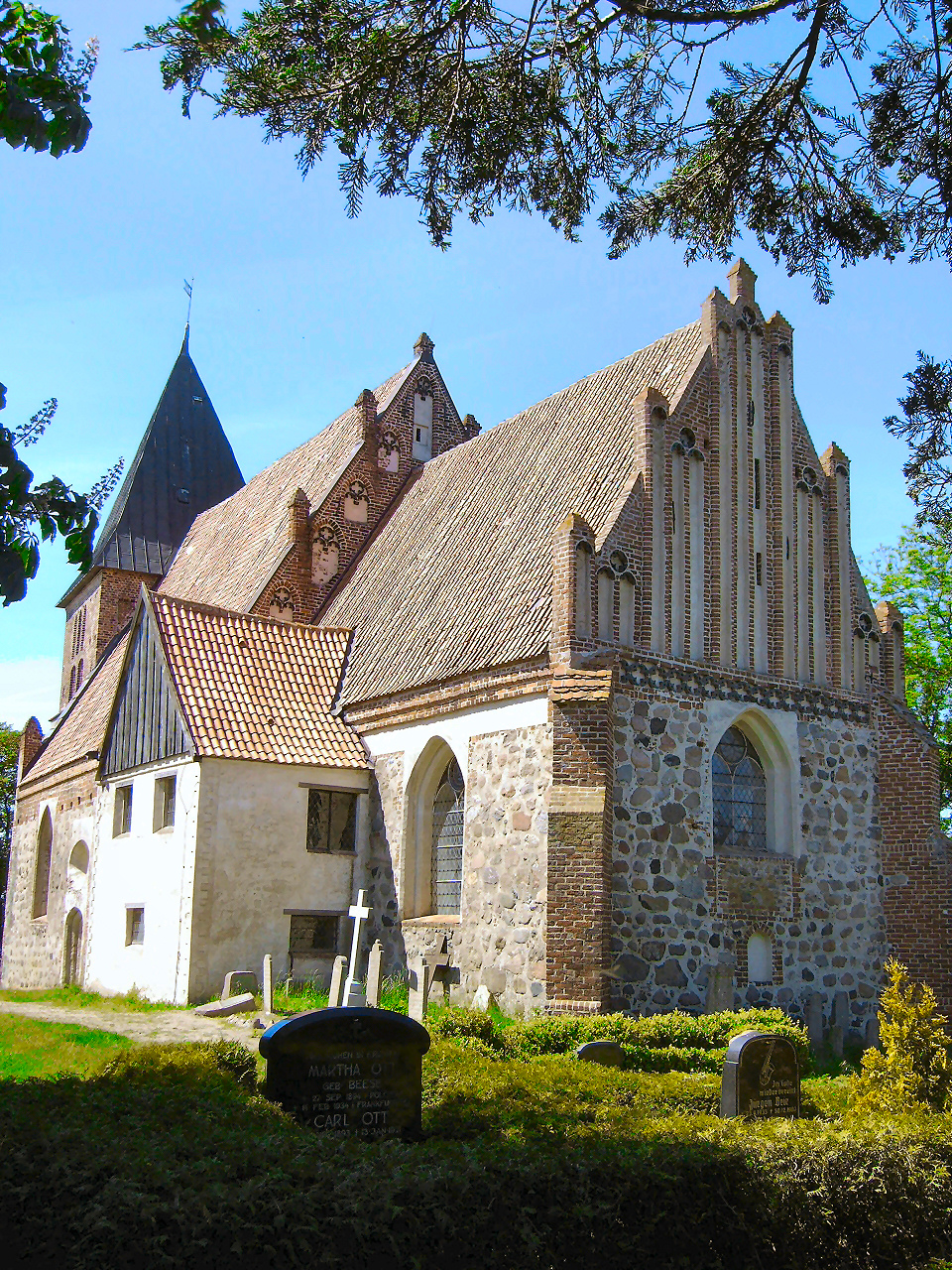
- St. Paul's Church, Bobbin

- Coat of arms

- Location of Glowe within Vorpommern-Rügen district
- Interactive map of Glowe
- Location within Germany Location within Mecklenburg-Vorpommern
- Coordinates: 54°34′13″N 13°28′8″E
- Country: Germany
- State: Mecklenburg-Vorpommern
- District: Vorpommern-Rügen
- Municipal assoc.: Nord-Rügen

Government
  - Mayor: Uwe Radeisen

Area
  - Total: 22.14 km^{2} (8.55 sq mi)
- Elevation: 4 m (13 ft)

Population (2025-12-31)
  - Total: 982
  - Density: 44.4/km^{2} (115/sq mi)
- Time zone: UTC+01:00 (CET)
  - Summer (DST): UTC+02:00 (CEST)
- Postal codes: 18551
- Dialling codes: 038302
- Vehicle registration: RÜG
- Website: www.glowe.de

Glowe is a municipality in the Vorpommern-Rügen district, in Mecklenburg-Vorpommern, Germany. It is a state-recognised resort.

== Geography ==
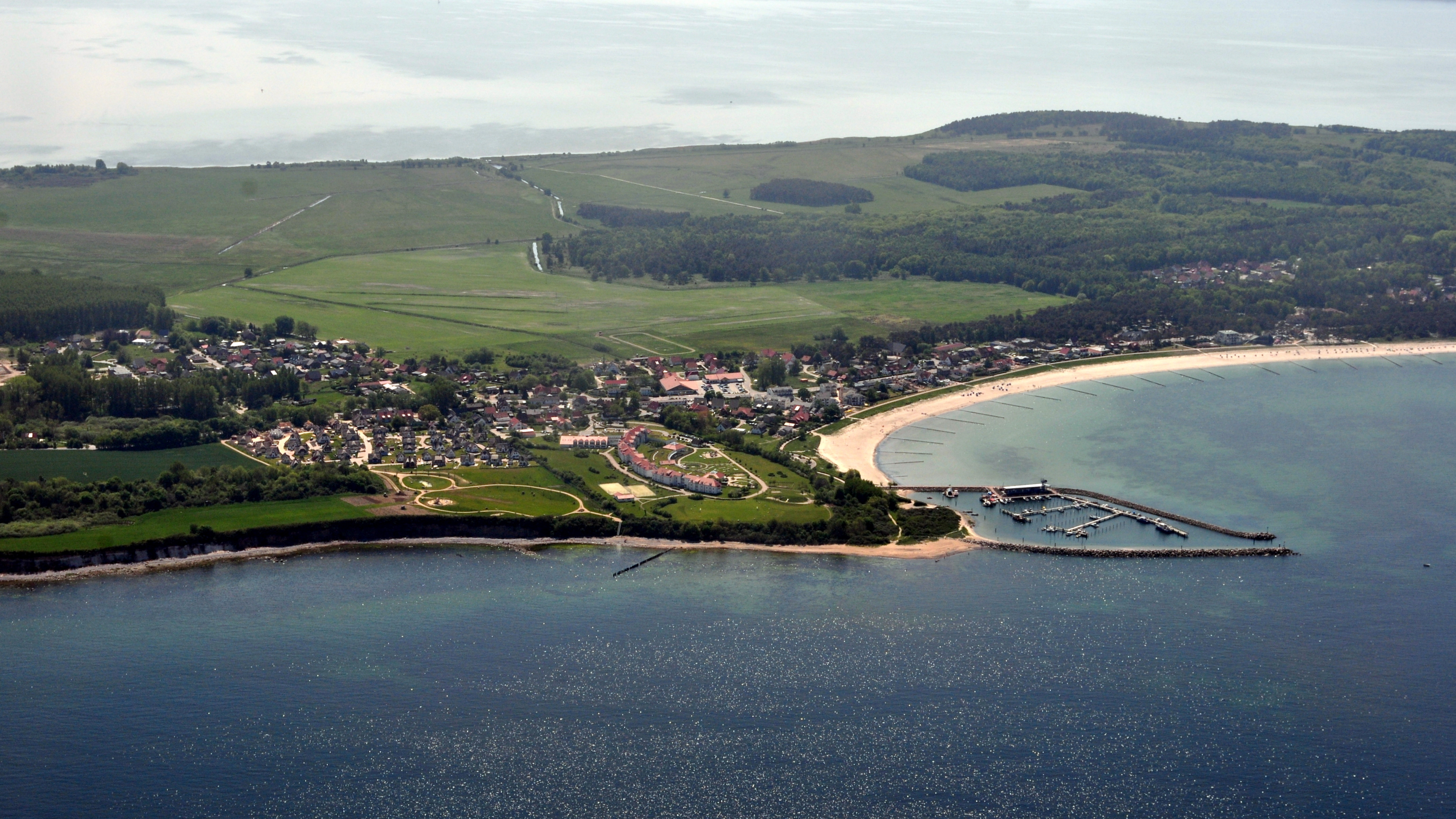
Glowe in 2011

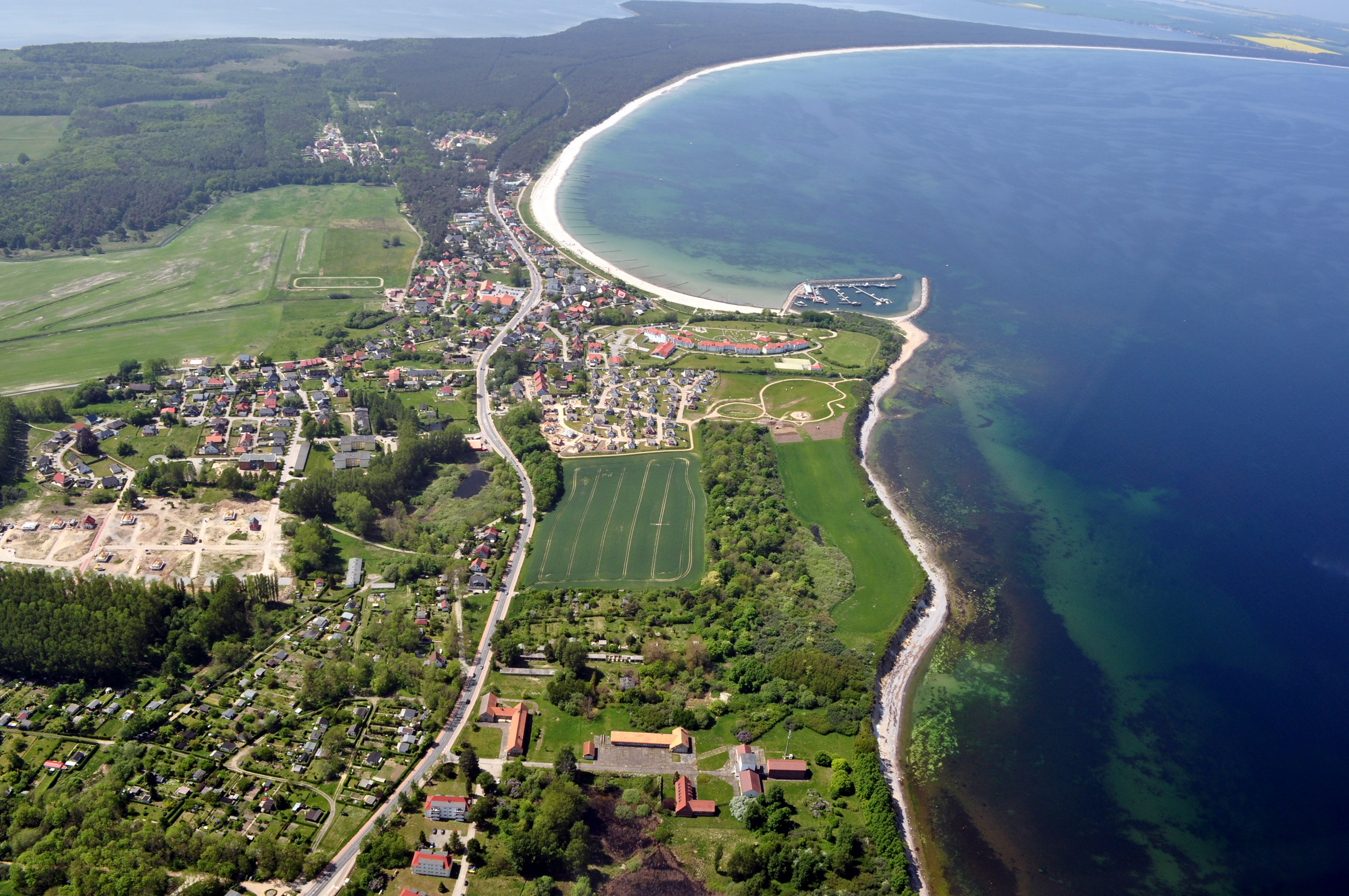
Glowe aerial view

Glowe lies about 18 kilometres north of Bergen auf Rügen and is located at the western end of the boundary between the Jasmund peninsula and the narrow land bridge of Schaabe between the Baltic Sea (the bay of Tromper Wiek) and the lagoon of Großer Jasmunder Bodden.

=== Municipal subdivisions ===
The municipality consists of the villages:

- Glowe
- Baldereck
- Kampe
- Bobbin
- Polchow
- Ruschvitz
- Spyker

== History ==
Glowe was first documented in 1314. The name "Glowe" comes from the Slavic Gluowa or Glova and means something like "head", named after the 9-metre-high Königshörn, a small headland. The small parish grew up on and around the Königshörn.

The area was part of the Principality of Rügen until 1326 and thereafter the Duchy of Pomerania. Under the Treaty of Westphalia in 1648, Rügen, and thus the territory of Glowe, became part of Swedish Pomerania. In 1815, Glowe went, as part of New Western Pomerania, to the Prussian province of Pomerania. Since 1818, Glowe has been part of the county of Rügen.

As seaside resort tourism began to take off in the early 20th century, the former fishing village expanded more and more into the neighbouring woods of the Schaabewald.

From 1952 to 1955 Glowe was part of the county of Bergen. Thereafter the village became part of the county of Rügen again, this time in the district of Rostock until 1990, when it became part of the state of Mecklenburg-Western Pomerania. In 2011 the county of Rügen was merged into Vorpommern-Rügen.

== Sights ==
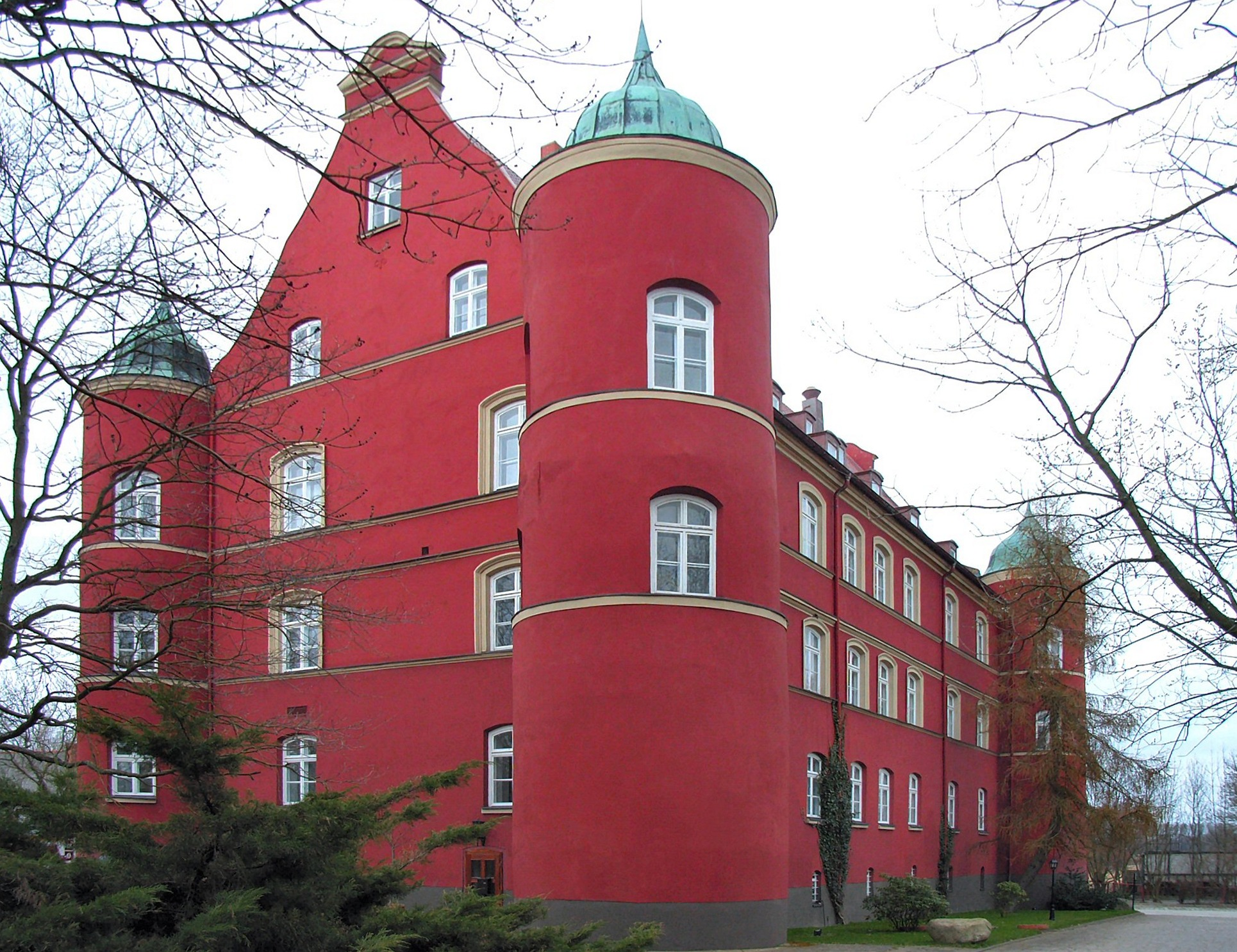
Spyker Castle

- The Muschel ("mussel") in Glowe: a prestressed concrete building by Ulrich Müther in the shape of a mussel (until 1990 known as the Ostseeperle restaurant)
- Sea promenade and harbour in Glowe
- Spycker Castle, now a hotel once belonged to the Swedish field marshal and governor general of Swedish Pomerania, Carl Gustav Wrangel
- Lake Spycker
- Fishing village of Polchow with harbour
- Gothic fieldstone church of St. Paul's in Bobbin dating to the 14th century
- Glowe Chapel
- Dinosaur Land
- The DGzRS lifeboat, Kurt Hoffmann, is stationed in Glowe
