= Spyker Castle =

Historic building in the German state of Mecklenburg-Vorpommern

Coordinates: 54°33′25″N 13°30′49″E

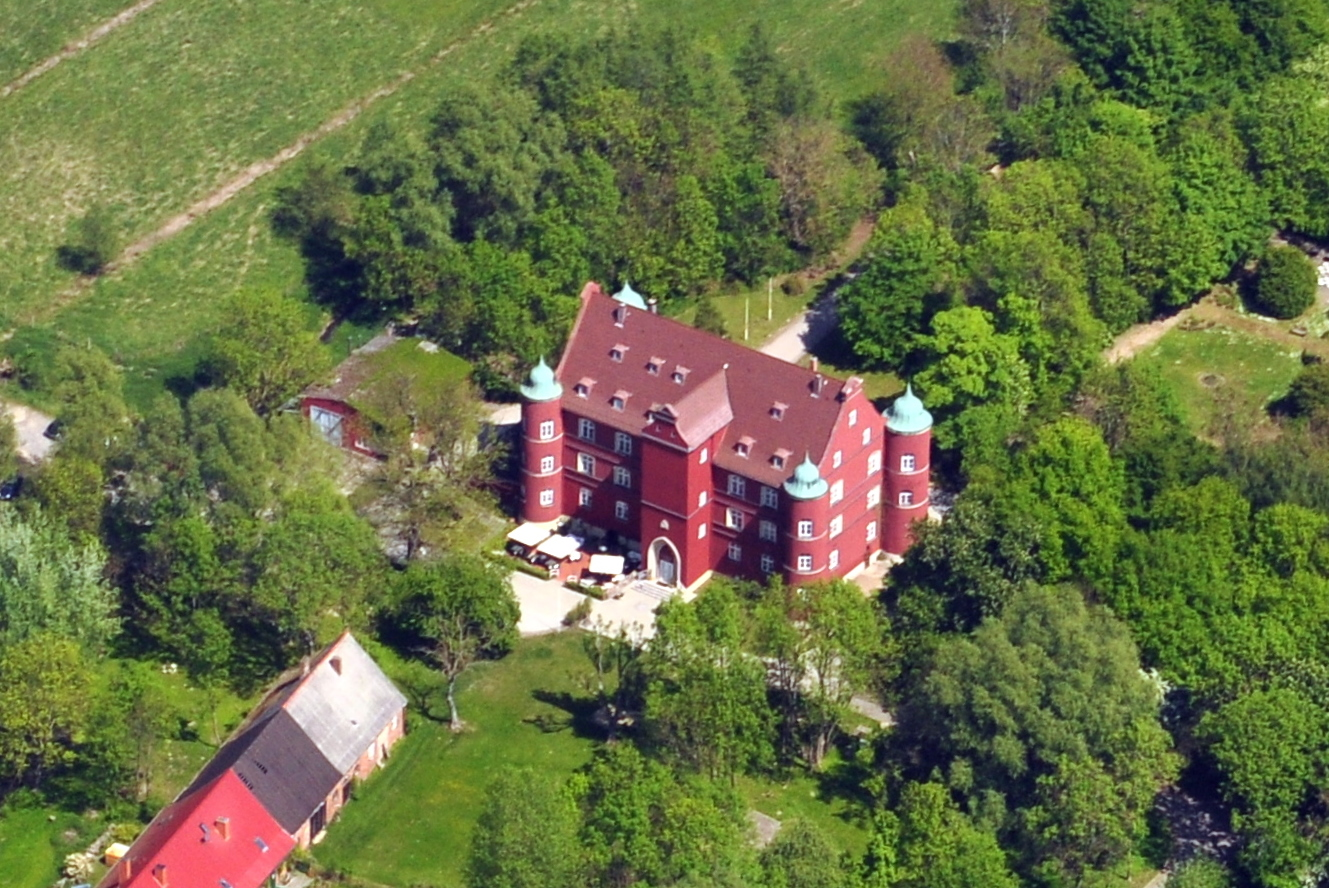
Spyker Castle (2011)

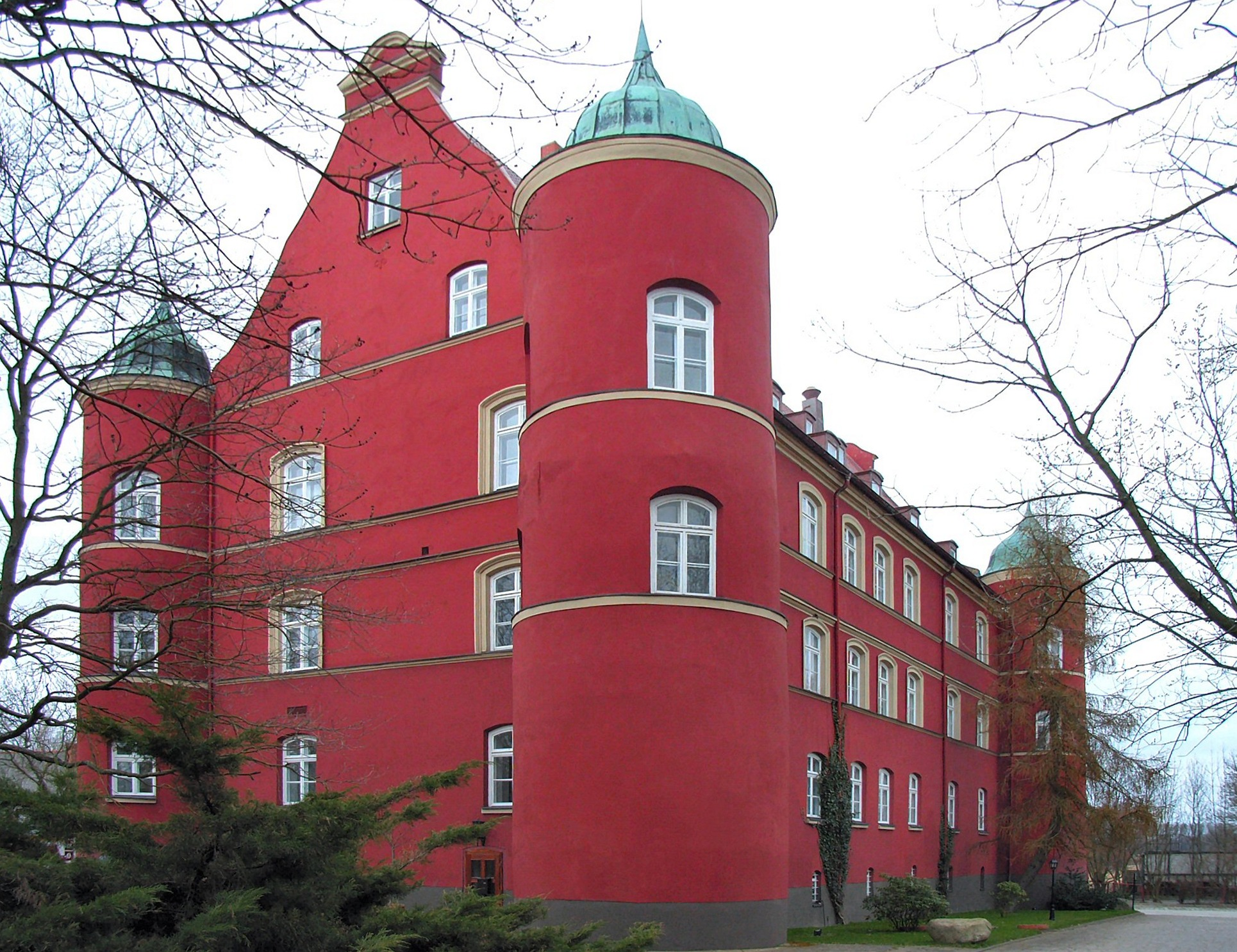
Spyker Castle

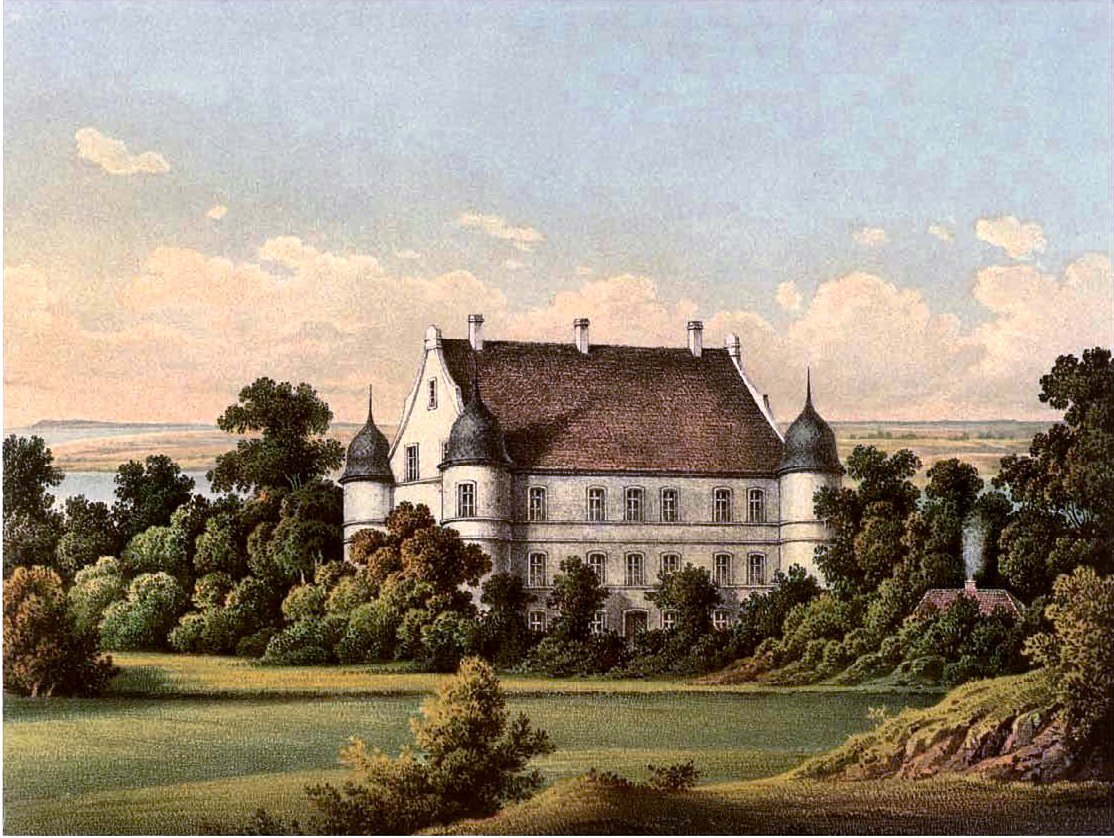
Spyker Castle around 1860, Alexander Duncker Collection

The Spyker Castle (German: Schloss Spy(c)ker) and estate lie on the territory of the municipality of Glowe in the district of Vorpommern-Rügen in the German state of Mecklenburg-Vorpommern. Spycker Castle is the oldest profane structure on the Baltic Sea island of Rügen.

== History ==
Spycker was first recorded in 1318. It belonged at that time to the Stralsund patrician family, the von Külpens. In 1344 a daughter from the House of von Külpen married the Jasmunds. As a result, the Spyker branch of the von Jasmunds was founded which died without issue in 1648.

As a result of the Thirty Years' War, Pomerania, and hence Rügen, fell to Sweden under the Treaty of Westphalia in 1648. As a reward for his wartime services, Queen Christine of Sweden gave the now empty seat of Spycker in 1649 to the Swedish field marshal and later governor-general of Swedish Pomerania, Carl Gustav Wrangel. The castle, originally furnished with a defensive moat, was remodelled after 1650 into its present appearance as a Renaissance schloss and painted in Swedish Falu red, which was atypical of Rügen. Fully sculptured stucco ceilings, unique in the Baltic region, date to around 1652.

After the death of Carl Gustav Wrangel in 1676, the property passed to his daughter Eleanora-Sophia, wife of the Lord of Putbus. Eleanora-Sophia died in 1687, and the property went to the Swedish family of Brahe, with whom her older sister was connected by marriage. After its occupation by the Napoleonic troops in 1806/07 Spycker temporarily became the seat of the French governor of Rügen. In 1815, Rügen, which had hitherto been Swedish, was handed over to Prussia. Magnus Fredrik Brahe sold Spycker in 1817 and it came into the possession of Prince Wilhelm Malte I of Putbus.

Until the land reform in the Soviet Occupation Zone in 1945, the estate remained in the possession of the von Putbus family. In subsequent years, the castle was left to decay. From the 1960s until 1989, the East German trade union federation, FDGB, used the castle as a holiday home. Since 1990, the castle has been used as a hotel and, in 1995, it was restored in line with its historical appearance. The hotel has 32 guest rooms.

=== Current use ===
In March 2006, the castle and its 67,000-square-foot estate was purchased at a forced sale by the present owner. The buyer was the architect, Dominik von Boettinger, who, in addition to the hotel and restaurant operation of the castle, also wants to use it as a cultural centre with exhibitions, concerts, readings, and a sculpture park.
