= Rubenow =

- Municipality
- Location of Rubenow within Vorpommern-Greifswald district
- Interactive map of Rubenow
- Location within Germany Location within Mecklenburg-Vorpommern
- Coordinates: 54°06′N 13°43′E
- Country: Germany
- State: Mecklenburg-Vorpommern
- District: Vorpommern-Greifswald
- Municipal assoc.: Lubmin
- Subdivisions: 7

Government
  - Mayor: Bernd-Ulrich Knorr

Area
  - Total: 35.21 km^{2} (13.59 sq mi)
- Elevation: 9 m (30 ft)

Population (2025-12-31)
  - Total: 750
  - Density: 21/km^{2} (55/sq mi)
- Time zone: UTC+01:00 (CET)
  - Summer (DST): UTC+02:00 (CEST)
- Postal codes: 17509
- Dialling codes: 038354
- Vehicle registration: VG
- Website: www.amtlubmin.de

Rubenow is a municipality in the Vorpommern-Greifswald district, in Mecklenburg-Vorpommern, Germany. It consists of

- Rubenow
- Rubenow-Siedlung
- Groß Ernsthof
- Latzow
- Nieder-Voddow
- Nonnendorf
- Voddow
