= Wrangelsburg =

- Municipality
- Flag

- Location of Wrangelsburg within Vorpommern-Greifswald district
- Interactive map of Wrangelsburg
- Location within Germany Location within Mecklenburg-Vorpommern
- Coordinates: 54°1′N 13°36′E
- Country: Germany
- State: Mecklenburg-Vorpommern
- District: Vorpommern-Greifswald
- Municipal assoc.: Züssow

Government
  - Mayor: Andreas Juds

Area
  - Total: 14.99 km^{2} (5.79 sq mi)
- Elevation: 24 m (79 ft)

Population (2025-12-31)
  - Total: 231
  - Density: 15.4/km^{2} (39.9/sq mi)
- Time zone: UTC+01:00 (CET)
  - Summer (DST): UTC+02:00 (CEST)
- Postal codes: 17495
- Dialling codes: 038355
- Vehicle registration: VG

Wrangelsburg is a municipality in the Vorpommern-Greifswald district, in Mecklenburg-Vorpommern, Germany.
