= Buddenhagen =

- Ortsteil of Wolgast
- Interactive map of Buddenhagen
- Location within Germany Location within Mecklenburg-Vorpommern
- Coordinates: 54°00′N 13°42′E
- Country: Germany
- State: Mecklenburg-Vorpommern
- District: Vorpommern-Greifswald
- Town: Wolgast

Area
  - Total: 11.79 km^{2} (4.55 sq mi)
- Elevation: 24 m (79 ft)

Population (2010-12-31)
  - Total: 425
  - Density: 36.0/km^{2} (93.4/sq mi)
- Time zone: UTC+01:00 (CET)
  - Summer (DST): UTC+02:00 (CEST)
- Postal codes: 17440
- Dialling codes: 03836
- Vehicle registration: VG, WLG
- Website: www.amt-am-peenestrom.de

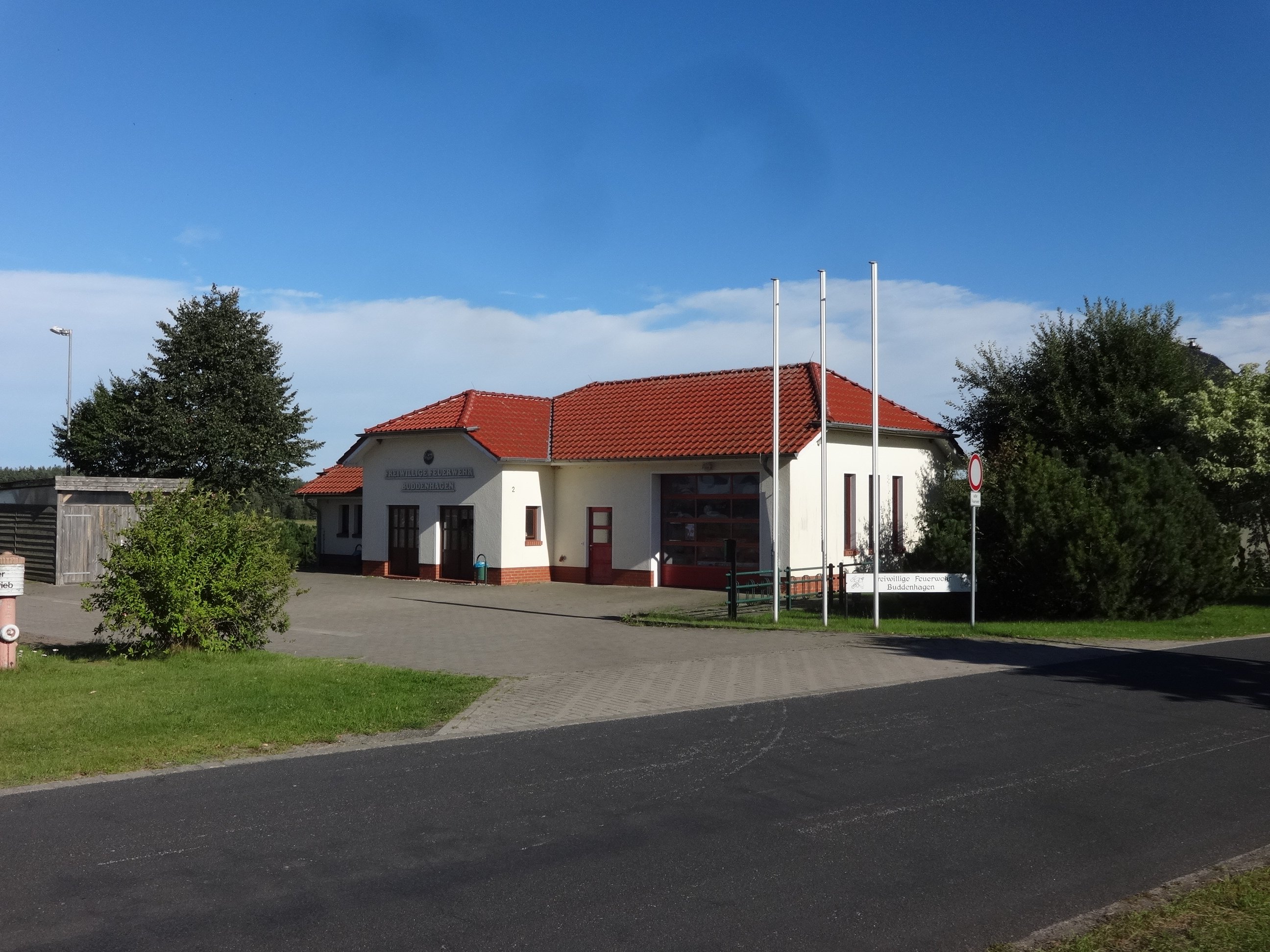

Buddenhagen (German pronunciation: [bʊdn̩ˈhaːɡn̩]) was a municipality of the Vorpommern-Greifswald district, in Mecklenburg-Vorpommern, Germany. Since 1 January 2012, it is part of the town Wolgast.

== Buddenhagener Moore ==
Buddenhagener Moore is a nature reserve that takes up the majority of the municipality. it is a 110-hectare piece of land that hosts various species, notably bird species like the Middle Woodpecker, the pied flycatcher, and the crossbill.

== Buddenhagen Train Station ==
Notably, there is also a train station in the municipality called Buddenhagen (RB23) which travels from Züssow to Świnoujście Centrum.
