= Swedish conquest of Langeland (1659) =

1659 Swedish invasion of Langeland

- Part of the Dano-Swedish War (1658–1660)
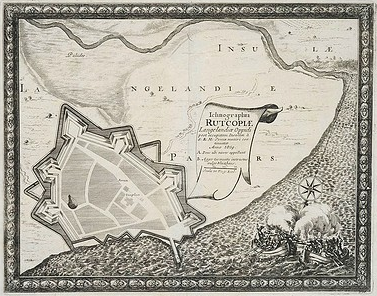
- Map of Rudkøbing, Langeland, by Erik Dahlbergh in 1659
Date	20–21 March 1659
Location	Langeland, Denmark 54°55′N 10°45′E
Result	Swedish victory
Territorial changes	Langeland conquered by Sweden

Belligerents
(yes) Swedish Empire	Denmark–Norway

Commanders and leaders
(Swedish Empire) Carl Gustaf Wrangel (Swedish Empire) Henrik Horn (Swedish Empire) Lindenberg (POW) (Swedish Empire) Tering Henriksson	(Denmark–Norway) Jochim Körber (Denmark–Norway) Enevold Bille (POW) (Denmark–Norway) Christian Steensen (Denmark–Norway) Hans Wardinghausen

Units involved
(Swedish Empire) 3 infantry regiments	(Denmark–Norway) 3 companies

Strength
1,900 cavalry 600 infantry 9–12 warships 22 smaller vessels	100 cavalry 200 infantry 1,200 militia

Casualties and losses
58 killed 206 wounded	Unknown (Note: According to Theatrum Europaeum, 300 Danes were killed or wounded and 300 additional captured)

The Swedish conquest of Langeland (Danish: Erobringen af Langeland) was a Swedish amphibious invasion and conquest of the Danish island of Langeland in March 1659, during the Dano-Swedish War of 1658–1660. By performing a pincer movement through two different beachheads, the Swedes, commanded by Carl Gustaf Wrangel, managed to conquer the island despite resistance.

== Background ==
During the Swedish March Across the Belts, Langeland was invaded by Charles X Gustav on 5 February 1658. At the Treaty of Roskilde, Langeland remained under Swedish occupation, together with Jutland and Funen. However, as the war reignited, the population on the island started to obtain more courage and resistance.

When the Swedes felt secure about their control of the island, they diverted troops from it, so its defense only amounted to minor rytterkommandoer (cavalry commands). The Danish commander on Lolland-Falster, Jochim Körber, saw this as a favorable opportunity to reconquer the island. With the help of a minor flotilla, Körber was able to land troops on the island and drive out the Swedes at the end of September 1658.

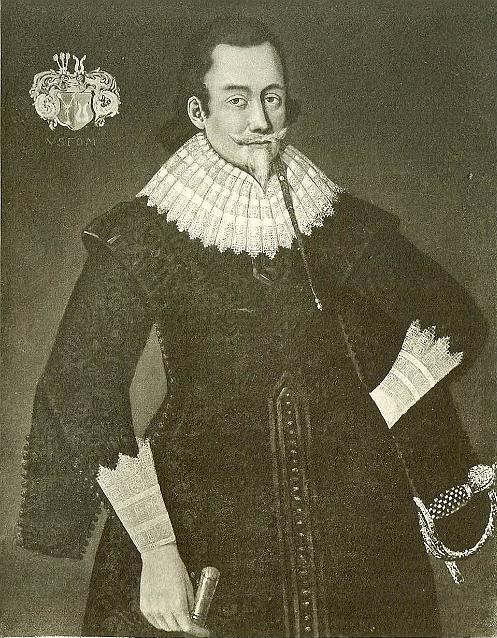
Danish landowner and landsdommer of Langeland, Vincents Steensen. Steensen died on 17 February 1659 under a Swedish attack on the island.

However, on 6 October and the following days, the Swedes made their first attempt to reconquer the island. Despite getting repelled on land, the Swedes continued to bombard Rudkøbing for two days, after which they would retreat. On 17 October, another Swedish attempt ended in failure, this time with serious casualties. While the following months were limited to reconnaissance, the Swedes launched another invasion on 6 February, mortally wounding the landsdommer (High Court judge), Vincents Steensen. Despite this, the invasion was repulsed by a night attack, with only half of the Swedish force being unharmed by the time of their retreat. A concurrent Swedish attack, ordered by Field Marshal Carl Gustaf Wrangel, landed on 8 February on the island's southern side, yet was defeated after 3 days of heavy combat.

After the assault on Copenhagen, the conquest of the Langeland became increasingly necessary for Sweden, because the island provided food supplies for Copenhagen. In February and March, Wrangel prepared an invasion force in Nyborg, consisting of 2.500 men and 9–12 warships. General Lieutenant Henrik Horn would lead an attack on the western side of the island, while Wrangel would lead the main attack on the eastern side.

== Invasion ==
On 20 March, the Swedish invasion fleet was set sail and Wrangel and Horn coordinated their attacks to occur simultaneously. Wrangel went east around Hou and anchored off Uglebjerg at 2:00 p.m. with the invasion planned carefully. The infantry began disembarking under Oberstleutnant Wulff and Major Lindenberg, yet were met with heavy fire from the Danes. Many Swedes were wounded, and two large barges with Major Lindenberg and 50 musketeers drifted ashore and could not be maneuvered back to the Swedish fleet. Danish cavalrymen and infantrymen went into the water and attacked the Swedish barges, resulting in Lindenberg surrendering and being imprisoned. Wrangel acknowledged the Danish resilience in a letter to the Swedish king:

Considering the strong resistance and obstinacy of the people, and the large number of people, nothing more could be accomplished, which I humbly can assure Your Majesty, that no soldiers could have done better, than they did."

— Carl Gustaf Wrangel

Wrangel was forced to let his troops board again and accounted the day's losses at 36 dead and 100 wounded. As soon as the moon went down, Wrangel sailed south with the transport vessels and barges following him. Meanwhile, Major Tering Henriksson was to remain with the other ships at Hou to continue to alarm the Danish defenders with attacks, in order to keep them occupied. At 1:00 a.m. while dark, Wrangel reached Spodsbjerg and disembarked his troops without any Danish resistance.

When it grew light, the Danish defenders sensed trouble. As soon as they heard the news of Wrangels disembarkment, deemed any further resistance hopeless, and allowed the peasants to return unarmed to their homes. When Wrangel received reports that Horn's fleet encountered resistance at Strandby, he made his way there. However, when he arrived he only saw Horn's division, which was calmly disembarking. Horn's division had also been received with fierce resistance from the Danish peasants the day before. But this morning the Swedes noted the desertion of the peasants upon Wrangel's landing and safely disembarked.

== Aftermath ==
The island was subsequently conquered on 21 March. The men the Danes had captured the previous day were released, yet Major Lindenberg and two other ensigns had been sent to Nakskov before the surrender. Many Danish soldiers and several inhabitants of Langeland also escaped to Nakskov. The Danish commander, Enevold Bille, surrendered alongside other officers, while some of the scattered peasants were chased and shot. According to the Theatrum Europaeum, Bille with all mounted officers, 100 cavalry, Captain Bastian with 200 infantry, and most officers in the four companies of militia, consisting of 1,200 men, were captured. Theatrum Europaeum furthermore concludes that some 300 Danes were shot, while newer sources assess there is too little information to estimate the Danish casualties.

On the same evening, Wrangel went aboard again and sailed to Als, captured Nordborg, yet unsuccessfully attacked Sønderborg. He left Major General Count Johan of Waldeck in command of Langeland with three cavalry regiments, while he himself planned on an invasion of Lolland. Meanwhile, Jochim Körber sent news to Copenhagen about the island's capture:

That this good land has been taken pains my heart, especially for the poor loyal, honest subjects, who have defended themselves so valiantly, because they will now be utterly and completely ruined and tormented

— Jochim Körber

Körber immediately made plans to retake the island before the enemy could establish themselves firmly there and requested a fleet to assist. However, he was temporarily blocked by the superior Swedish fleet. Later, there were still plans to liberate the island. In June, Hans and Frederik Ahlefeldt tried to organize an expedition from Femern to retake Langeland and relieve Nakskov, which was besieged. Yet, it was never finalized due to the reluctance of Dutch naval assistance. From 21 March to 19 November, the island would be completely ruined, tormented, and raided by Count Waldeck's cavalry. Additionally, the inhabitants were conscribed to war service in the Swedish army and many were sent to Poland-Lithuania, Pomerania, and Riga.

When the anti-Swedish coalition made plans to reconquer Funen, Count Waldeck began to divert some of his troops from Langeland to Funen. Waldeck was subsequently imprisoned after the Battle of Nyborg, and the Danes quickly sent an expeditionary force to retake the island. After some fighting, the Swedes were expelled from the island on 19 November 1659.

== See also ==
- Bornholm uprising – 1658 Danish revolt on Bornholm
- Assault on Copenhagen (1659) – Part of the Second Northern War
- Battle of Rödsund – Sea battle between a Dano-Dutch fleet and a Swedish fleet

== Works cited ==
- Kiilsgaard, Christian (1949). Rudkøbing, Topografi og Bestyre [Rudkøbing, Topography and Management] (PDF) (in Danish). Langelands Centraltrykkeri.
- Lütken, Vilhelm (1909). Langelands historie [History of Langeland] (PDF) (in Danish). Rudkøbing: Fyens Stiftsbogtrykkeri.
- Nordentoft, Johan (1937). Nakskov og Svenskerne 1658 og 1659 [Nakskov and the Swedes 1658 and 1659] (PDF) (in Danish). Copenhagen: Reitzels Forlag.
- Hillingsø, Kjeld (2018). Broderstrid: Danmark mod Sverige 1657-60 [Brother War: Denmark against Sweden 1657-60] (in Danish). Gyldendal. ISBN 978-87-02-08800-7.
- von Essen, Michael (2023). Charles X's Wars: The Danish Wars 1657-1660. Helion & Company. p. 322.
- Meyer, Martin; Merian, Matthäus (1693). Theatri Europaei [The European theater] (in German). Vol. 8. Frankfurt: Görlin Merian. OCLC 931778119.
