= Gripenberg =

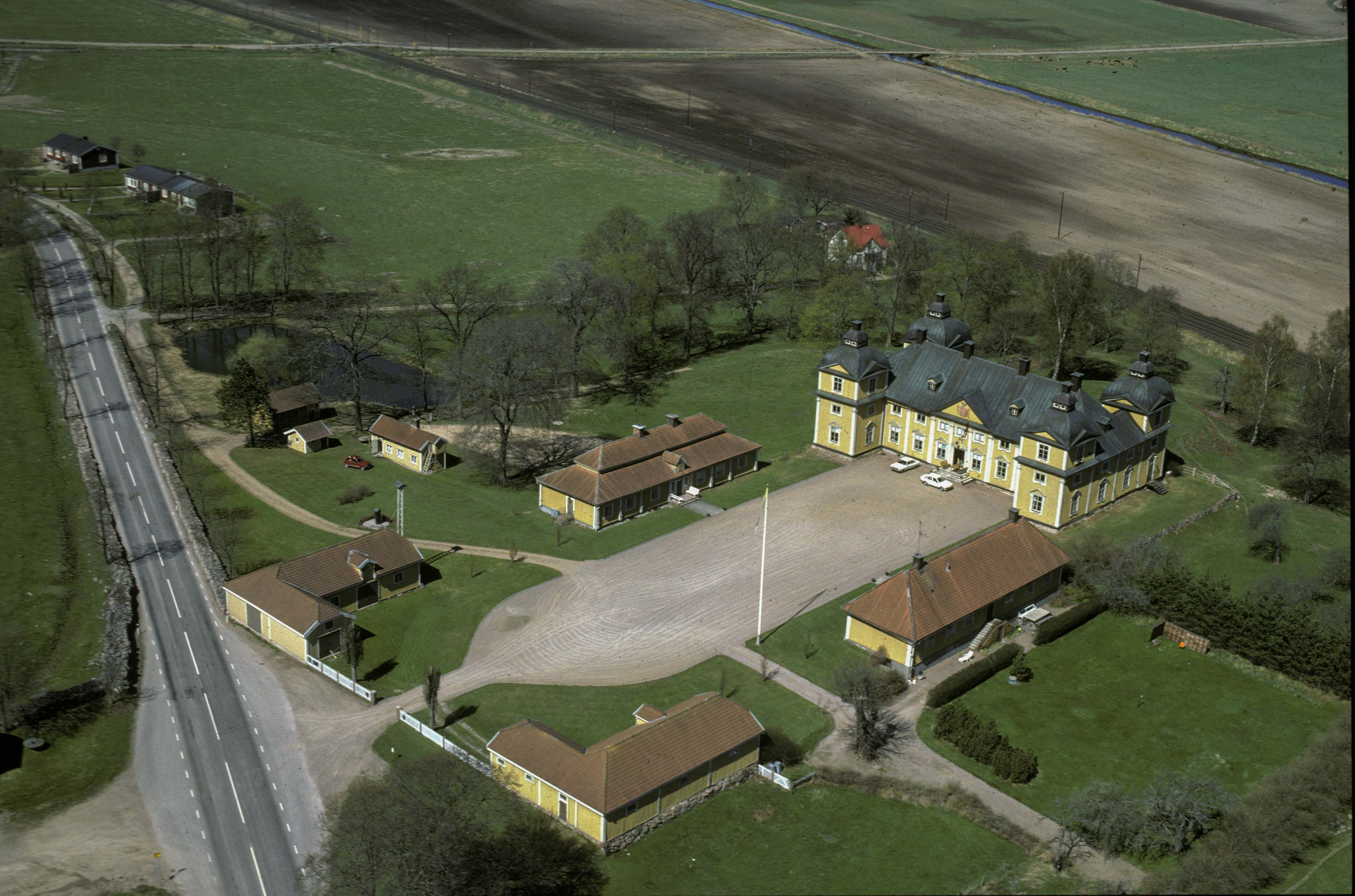

- Location within Jönköping Location within Sweden
- Coordinates: 57°59′34″N 14°51′10″E
- Country: Sweden
- Province: Småland
- County: Jönköping County
- Municipality: Tranås Municipality

Area
  - Total: 0.54 km^{2} (0.21 sq mi)

Population (31 December 2010)
  - Total: 292
  - Density: 545/km^{2} (1,410/sq mi)
- Time zone: UTC+1 (CET)
  - Summer (DST): UTC+2 (CEST)

Gripenberg is a locality situated in Tranås Municipality, Jönköping County, Sweden with 292 inhabitants in 2010.
