= Hohendorf =

- Ortsteil of Wolgast
- Interactive map of Hohendorf
- Location within Germany Location within Mecklenburg-Vorpommern
- Coordinates: 54°2′N 13°44′E
- Country: Germany
- State: Mecklenburg-Vorpommern
- District: Vorpommern-Greifswald
- Town: Wolgast
- Subdivisions: 4

Area
  - Total: 30.53 km^{2} (11.79 sq mi)
- Elevation: 8 m (26 ft)

Population (2010-12-31)
  - Total: 895
  - Density: 29.3/km^{2} (75.9/sq mi)
- Time zone: UTC+01:00 (CET)
  - Summer (DST): UTC+02:00 (CEST)
- Postal codes: 17440
- Dialling codes: 0 38 36
- Vehicle registration: VG
- Website: www.amt-am-peenestrom.de

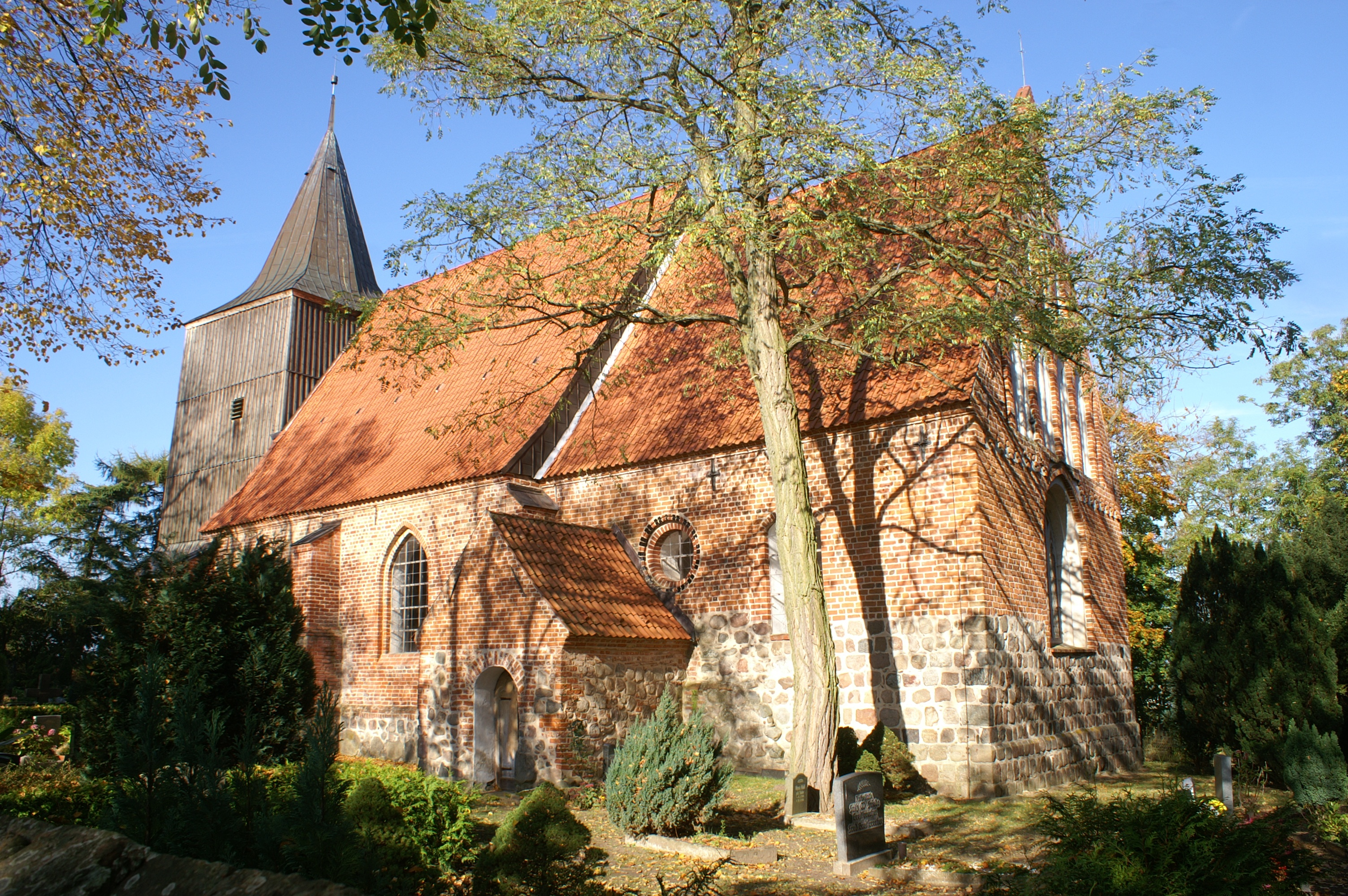
Village church in Hohendorf - Ostvorpommern district

Hohendorf (German pronunciation: [ˈhoːənˌdɔʁf]) is a village and a former municipality in the Vorpommern-Greifswald district, in Mecklenburg-Vorpommern, Germany. It consists of the villages Schalense, Pritzier, Hohendorf and Zarnitz. Since 1 January 2012, it is part of the town Wolgast.
