= Ekebyhov Castle =

Manor in Ekerö, Stockholm, Sweden

- Ekerö Municipality, Sweden
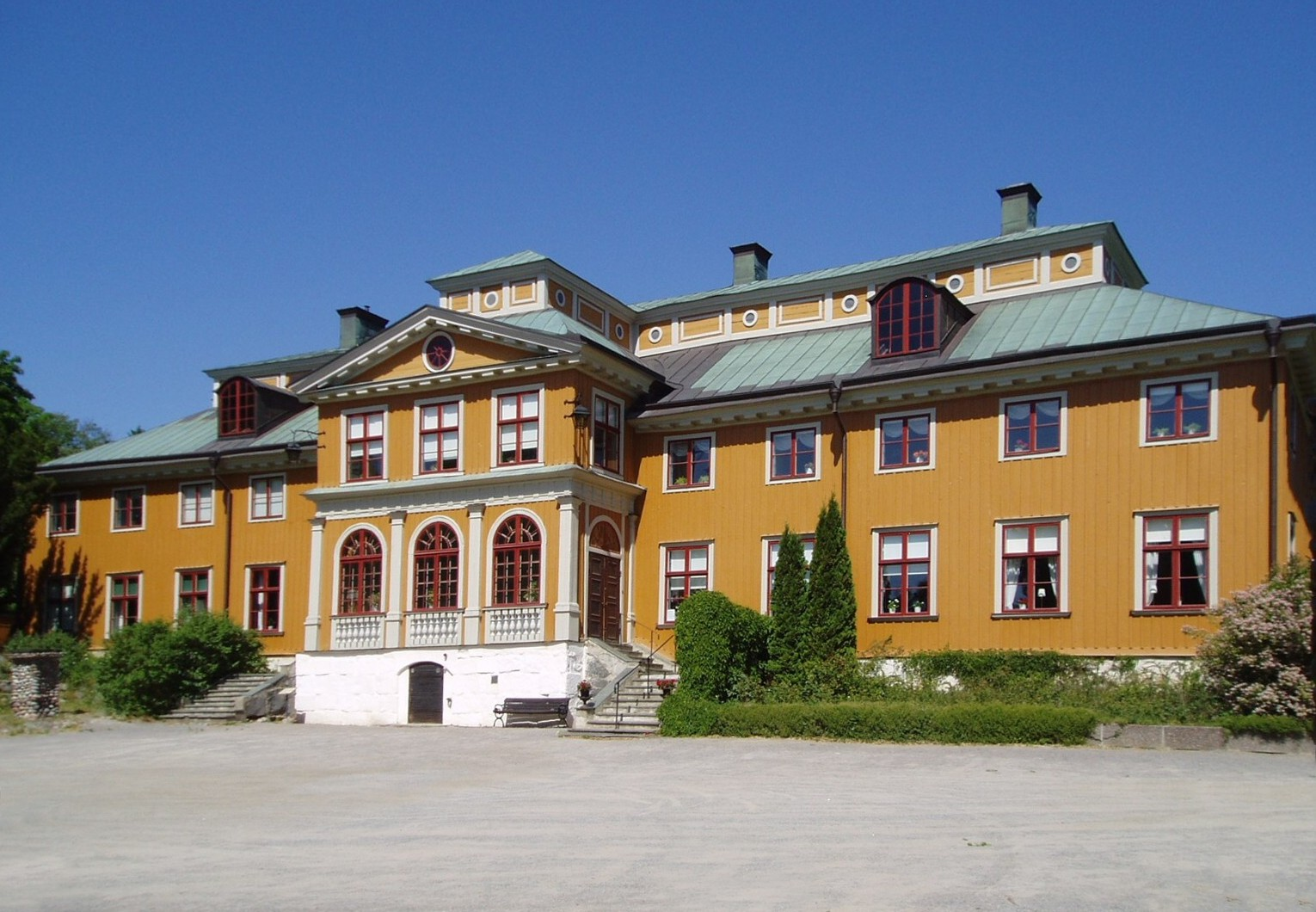

Ekebyhov Castle (Ekebyhovs slott) is a former manor in Ekerö Municipality in Stockholm County, Sweden. The facility has been owned by Ekerö municipality since 1980 and has been the site of Ekebyhovs Äppelgenbank since 1998.

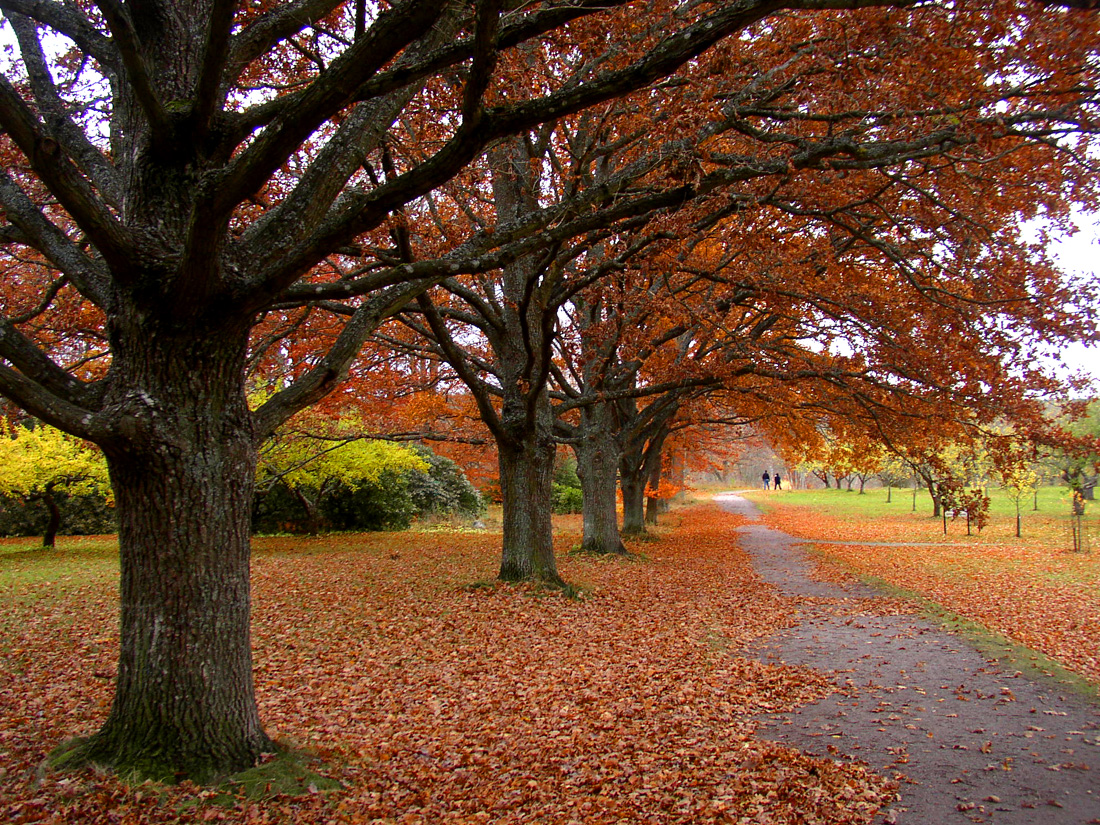
Ekebyhov park

Much of SVT's Christmas calendar Mirakel (2020) was shot at Ekebyhov Castle.

== See also ==
- List of castles in Sweden
