= Mölschow =

- Municipality
- Coat of arms

- Location of Mölschow within Vorpommern-Greifswald district
- Interactive map of Mölschow
- Location within Germany Location within Mecklenburg-Vorpommern
- Coordinates: 54°05′N 13°50′E
- Country: Germany
- State: Mecklenburg-Vorpommern
- District: Vorpommern-Greifswald
- Municipal assoc.: Usedom-Nord
- Subdivisions: 3

Government
  - Mayor: Roland Meyer

Area
  - Total: 15.3 km^{2} (5.9 sq mi)
- Elevation: 2 m (6.6 ft)

Population (2025-12-31)
  - Total: 749
  - Density: 49.0/km^{2} (127/sq mi)
- Time zone: UTC+01:00 (CET)
  - Summer (DST): UTC+02:00 (CEST)
- Postal codes: 17449
- Dialling codes: 038377
- Vehicle registration: VG

Mölschow is a municipality in the Vorpommern-Greifswald district, in Mecklenburg-Vorpommern, Germany. It consists of

- Bannemin
- Mölschow
- Zecherin
