= Battle of Kolberg =

Battle of Kolberg or Colberg may refer to

- Battle of Colberger Heide (1644), during the Danish-Swedish War, a theater of the Thirty Years' War
- Siege of Kolberg (Seven Years' War), three subsequent sieges in 1759, 1760 and 1761
- Siege of Kolberg (1807), during the Napoleonic Wars
- Battle of Kolberg (1945), during World War II
