= Battle of Oresund =

Battle of Oresund may refer to:

- Battle of Svolder, a naval battle fought in September 999 or 1000 in the western Baltic Sea between King Olaf Tryggvason of Norway and an alliance of his enemies, Denmark and Sweden
- Battle of the Sound, 1658, during the Second Northern War, near the Sound or Oresund, just north of Copenhagen involving Sweden, Denmark and the Netherlands
