= Thomas Heeremans =

Dutch painter

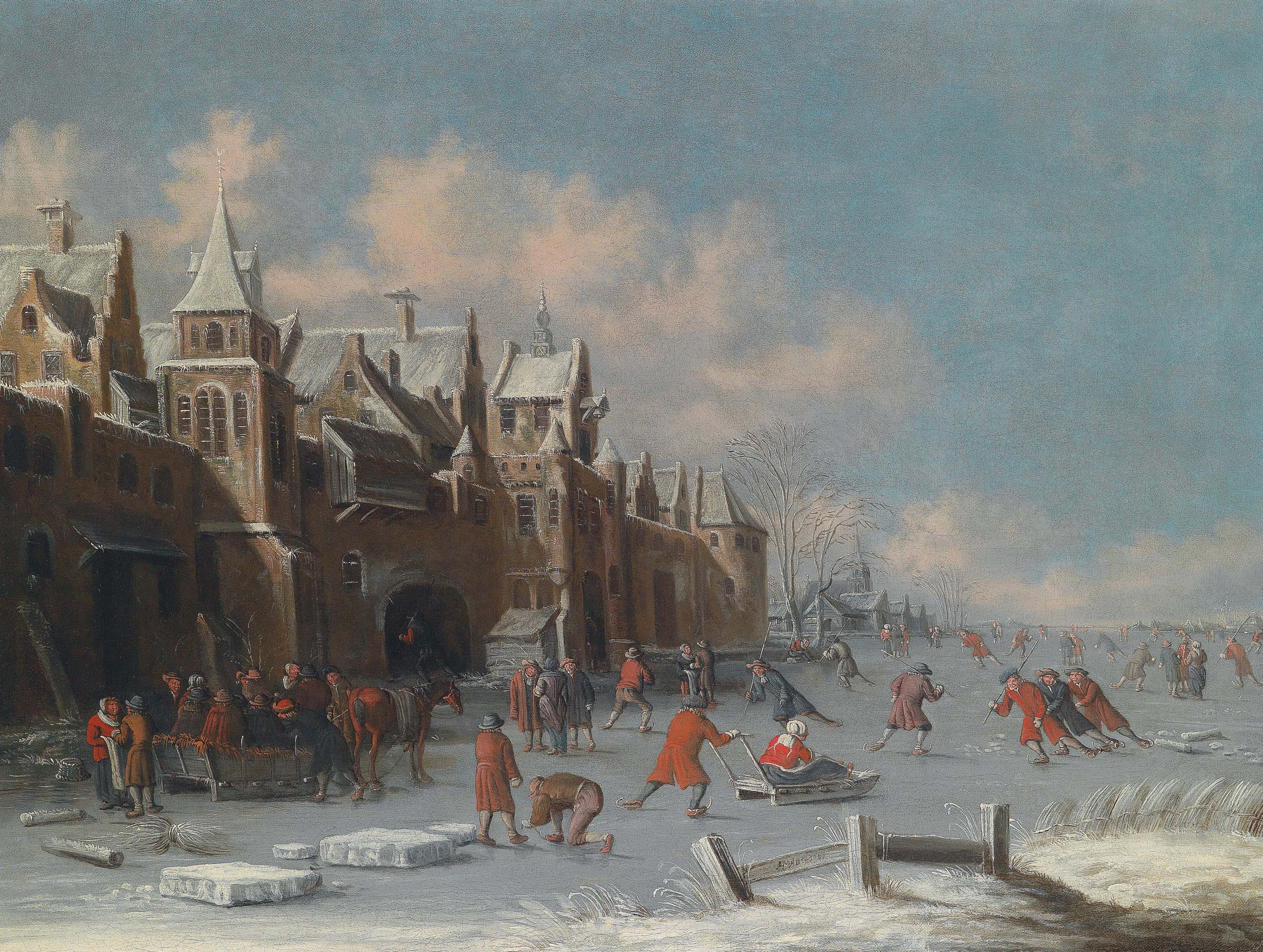
Skaters on the ice outside the gates of a Dutch city

Thomas Heeremans (1641–1694) was a Dutch painter and art dealer. He is known for his landscapes of winter scenes, cityscapes, harbor scenes, beach views, river views and village scenes. He was influenced by Klaes Molenaer, a slightly older painter also from Haarlem.

== Life ==
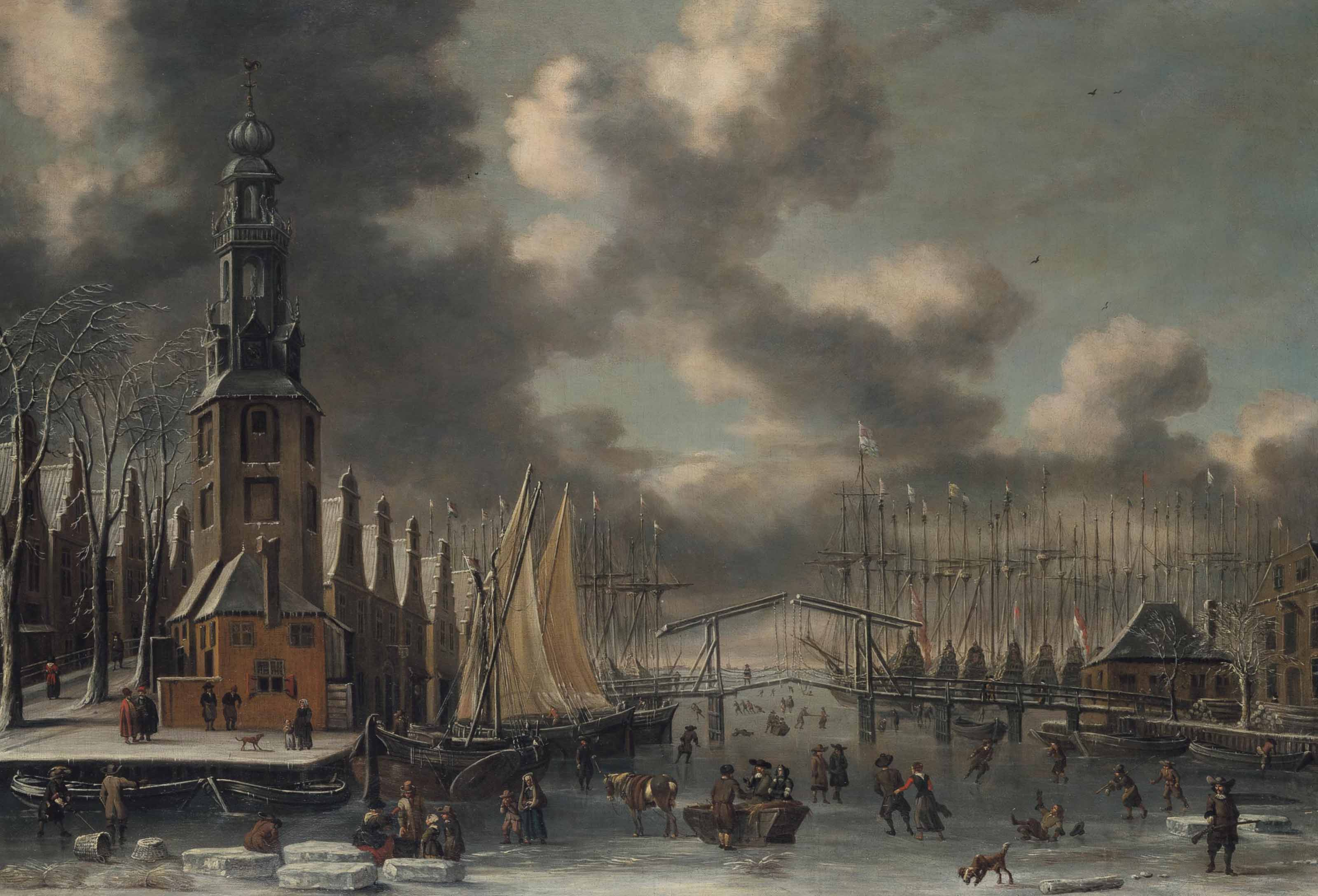
Winter landscape with the Montelbaanstoren, Amsterdam, collaboration with Abraham Storck

Heeremans was born and died in Haarlem. He was in the past sometimes erroneously referred to as Frederik Hendrik Mans, likely because he signed his name "THMANS" with the "THM" together, leading dealers to assume his name was F.H. Mans.

Heeremans was baptized in the Reformed Church of Haarlem on 29 May 1641. He became a member of the Haarlem Guild of St. Luke in 1664. He may have been a pupil of Caesar van Everdingen. Heeremans married Trijntje Claesdr (who was originally from Leiden) on 4 December 1663 in Haarlem. The couple had five children between 1664 and 1673, who were baptized in the Reformed Church. His first wife was buried on 26 September 1680. The artist then married Sibilla Juriaensdr., a woman from Marck county in Germany, with whom he had a son, Gijsbert.

The exact date of death of the artist is not known. It is recorded he was buried at the Noorderkerkhof on 24 January 1694.

== Work ==
He is primarily known for his winter landscapes, cityscapes, harbor scenes, beach views, river views and village scenes. He frequently returned to painting the beach at Scheveningen and the village, beach and ruins of Egmond. His pictures frequently go in pairs. His earliest dated work is from 1660 while last dated work is from 1695.

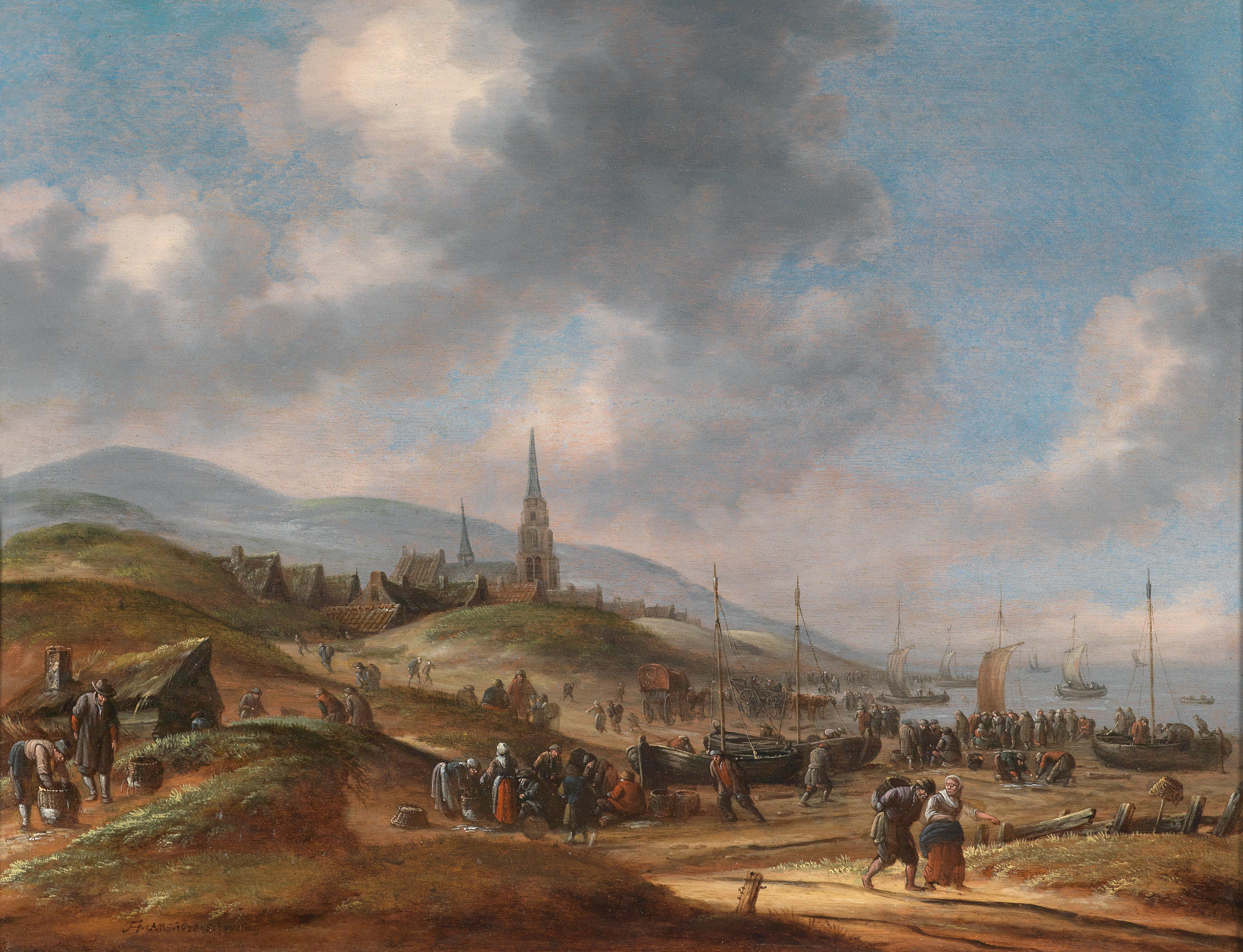
View of the beach at Scheveningen

No influence of his presumed master Caesar van Everdingen is visible in the work of Heeremans as he was purely a landscape artist and not a figure painter. His style was rather influenced by Klaes Molenaer particularly in his depiction of winter landscapes and river scenes. Heeremans' works are distinguished from the rather melancholic scenes of Molenaer by the use of a brighter palette and the introduction of more lively movement in the scenes, which are populated by many villagers engaged in various activities such as skating, sledging, fishing and talking.

Heeremans sometimes collaborated with specialist figure painters who would add the staffage in his landscapes. One of his collaborators was Abraham Storck, who painted the figures in the Winter landscape with the Montelbaanstoren, Amsterdam (Christie's New York sale of 14 April 2016, lot 247).
