= Klas Hansson Bjelkenstjerna =

Swedish naval officer and civil servant

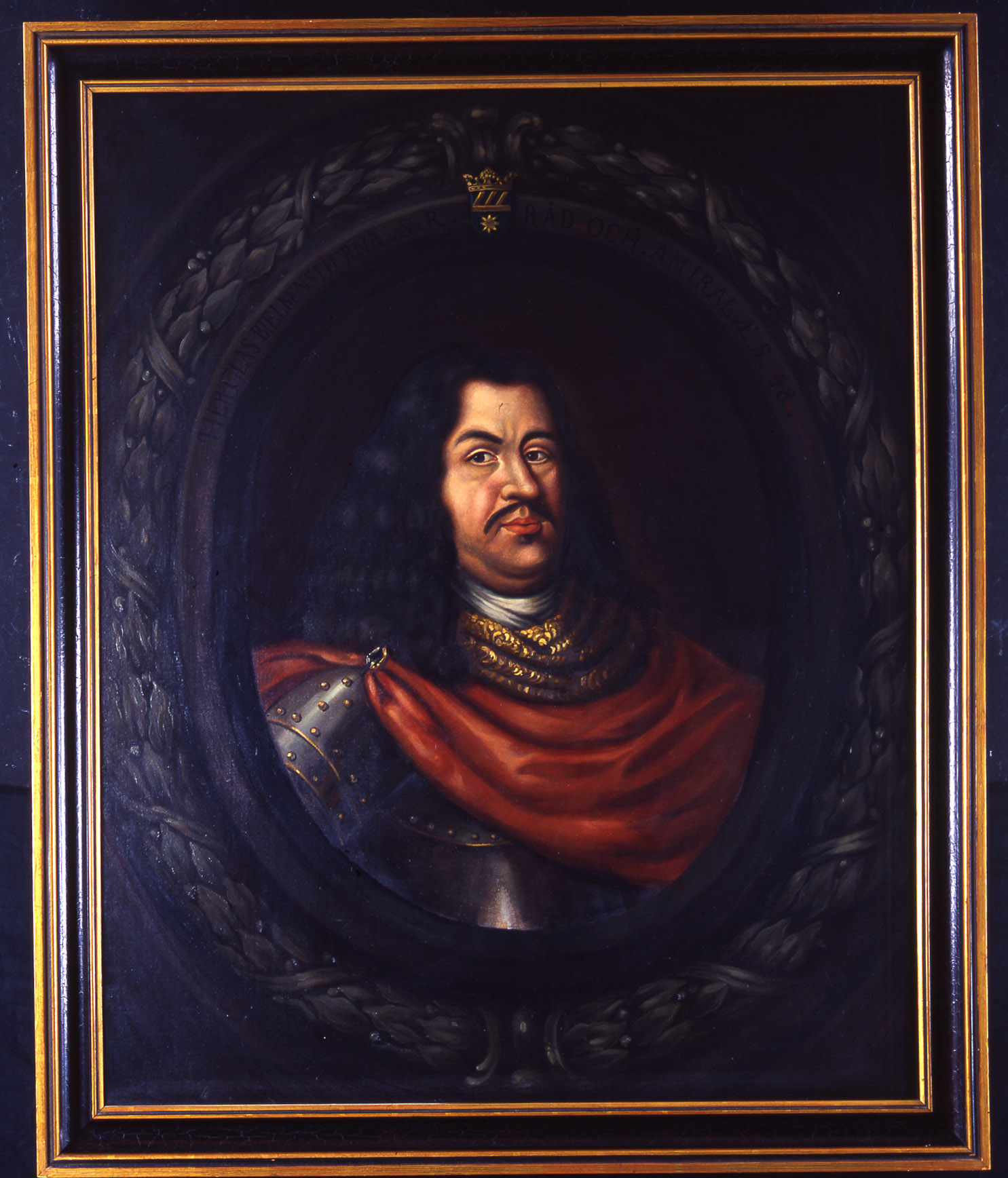
- Born: 24 April 1615
- Died: July 30, 1662 (aged 47)
- Military career
- Allegiance: Sweden
- Branch: Swedish Navy
- Rank: Admiral
- Conflicts: Thirty Years War; Torstenson War; Battle of Colberger Heide; Skirmish at Dieppe; Second Northern War; Battle of the Sound

Baron Klas Hansson Bjelkenstjerna (also Claës Hansson Bjelkenstjerna or Bielkenstjerna) (24 April 1615 – 30 July 1662) was a Swedish naval officer and civil servant.

His father, Hans Klasson Bjelkenstjerna, who also was a high-ranking naval officer, died when his son was only 5 years old, leaving him to be raised by relatives. Young Bjelkenstjerna soon grew up and followed in his father's footsteps, joining the Swedish navy.

He rose in rank within the navy, being appointed skeppsmajor in 1641. He married baroness Barbro Åkesdotter Natt och Dag in 1643. He participated in the sea campaigns against the Danish and Dutch fleets, in particular Battle of Colberger Heide (1644), and the escape from the Kiel Fjord where the Danish fleet tried to trap the Swedish squadrons. Due to his achievements in battle he was rewarded with a promotion to Admiral-Löjtnant.

In the autumn of 1645, he had sailed to Dieppe with the ships Jägaren and Fama in order to retrieve Magnus Gabriel de la Gardie. On the roadstead, he was fired upon by a large English warship, who wanted him to strike his sails. However, the cannonade didn't work out in the Englishmen's favor, and they were, after several hits to the hull, forced to head back out to sea. On the Swedish side, 9 men were killed.

Years of relative peace followed, with Bjelkenstjerna entering civil service. In 1650, he was appointed to överhovmästare (tutor) for the crown prince Carl Gustav. Queen Christina I granted him the barony of Pyhäjoki in the Northern Ostrobothnia region of Finland. This occurred in the year 1652. The following year Bjelkenstjerna became a member of the Privy Council.

At his deathbed the Swedish king Carl X Gustav called upon his former tutor Admiral Bjelkenstjerna and supposedly bid him farewell with the words: »Farväl, min hederlige Bjelkenstjerna! Tack för hvar dag vi varit tillsammans!» which translates to English as "Farewell, my honourable Bjelkenstjerna! I'm thankful for each day that we spent together!"

== Works cited ==
- Gyllengranat, C.A. (1840). Sjökrigs-Historien i Sammendrag [Naval War History in Summary] (in Swedish). Vol. 1. Karlskrona: Georg Ameen & Comp.
