= Anthonie Beerstraaten =

Dutch Golden Age painter

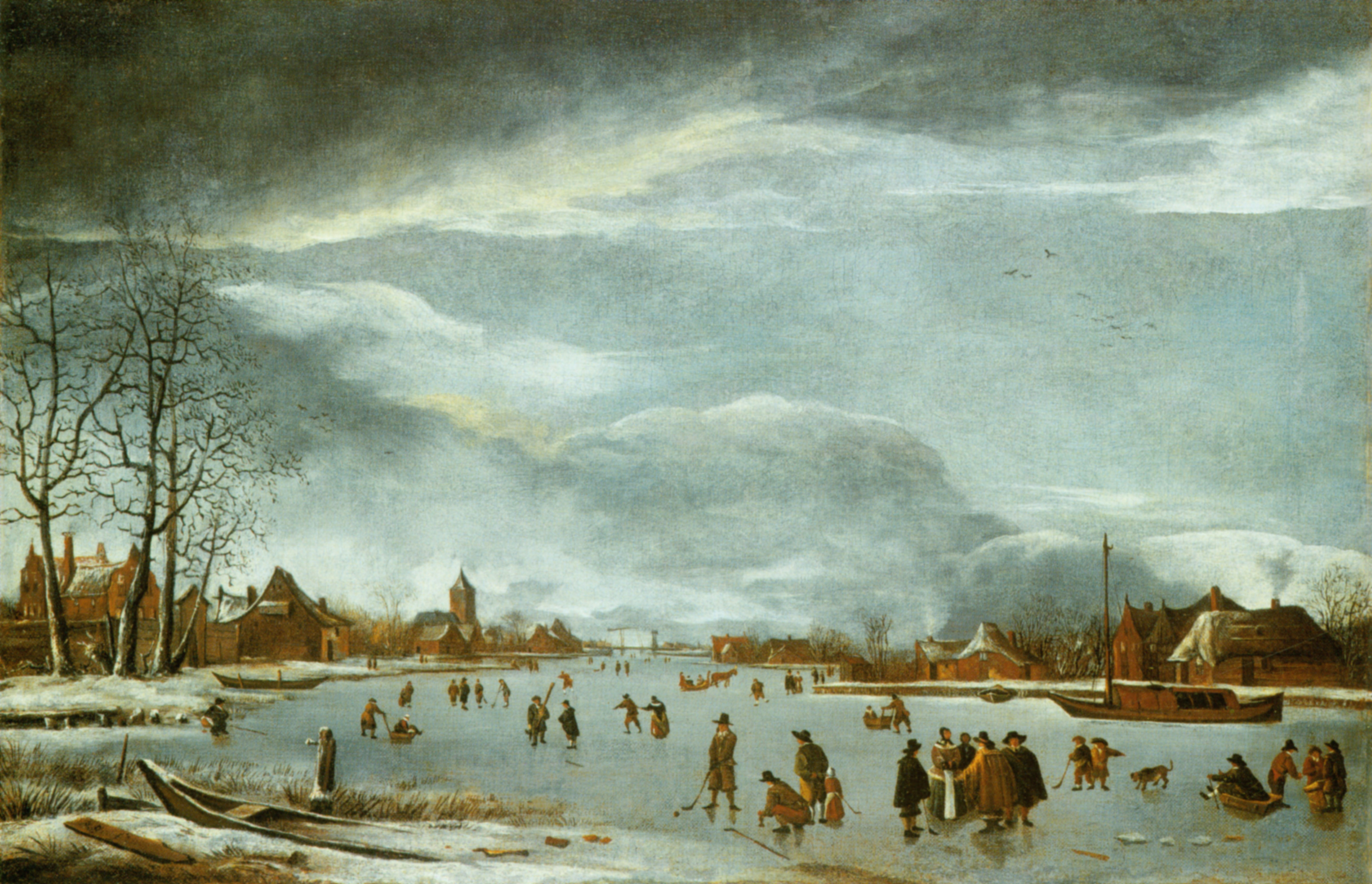
Winter landscape with ice-skaters on a river, ca. 1655

Anthonie Beerstraaten (4 February 1646, in Amsterdam – before 1665), is seen a Dutch Golden Age painter but he probably died at the age of six. Anthonie is not mentioned anywhere in the Amsterdam City Archives. His works are confused with those of Jan Abrahamsz Beerstraaten and Abraham Jansz. Beerstraaten, who were his father and his brother.

The RKD has registered two paintings signed Anthonie Beerstraten: one is a view of a southern seaport from 1664 (currently location Enkhuizen) and the other a view of a church in Aarlanderveen in the former city hall of Alphen aan den Rijn.

Based on these two paintings C. Hofstede de Groot an early Dutch art historian, suggested these paintings as by Anthonie if they were a poorer grade than ones already attributed to Abraham.
