= Abraham Beerstraaten =

Dutch Golden Age painter

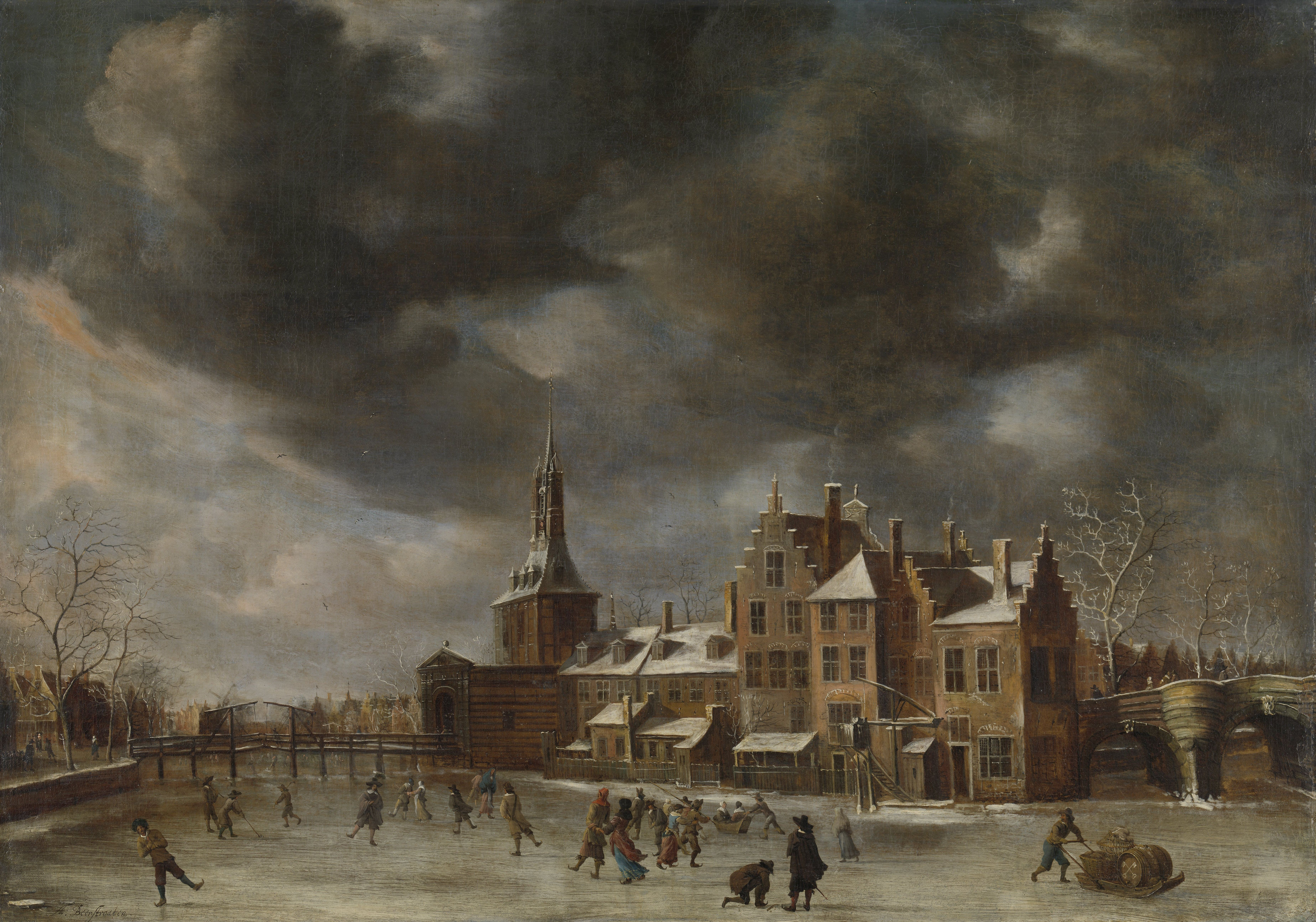
The Blauwpoort in Leiden in the winter, ca. 1660

Abraham Beerstraaten (1643 in Amsterdam – 1666), was a Dutch Golden Age painter of winter scenes.

Abraham was baptized in the Noorderkerk on 4 October as the son of Jan Abrahamsz Beerstraaten. In 1662, together with his father, he traveled to Friesland, Groningen and many other places in Holland. He died before September 1666. Abraham Storck who cooperated with him, inherited his unfinished paintings of the town hall.

Almost all sources and literature give divergent and often contradictory information. His works are confused with those of his father and brother Anthonie Beerstraaten.

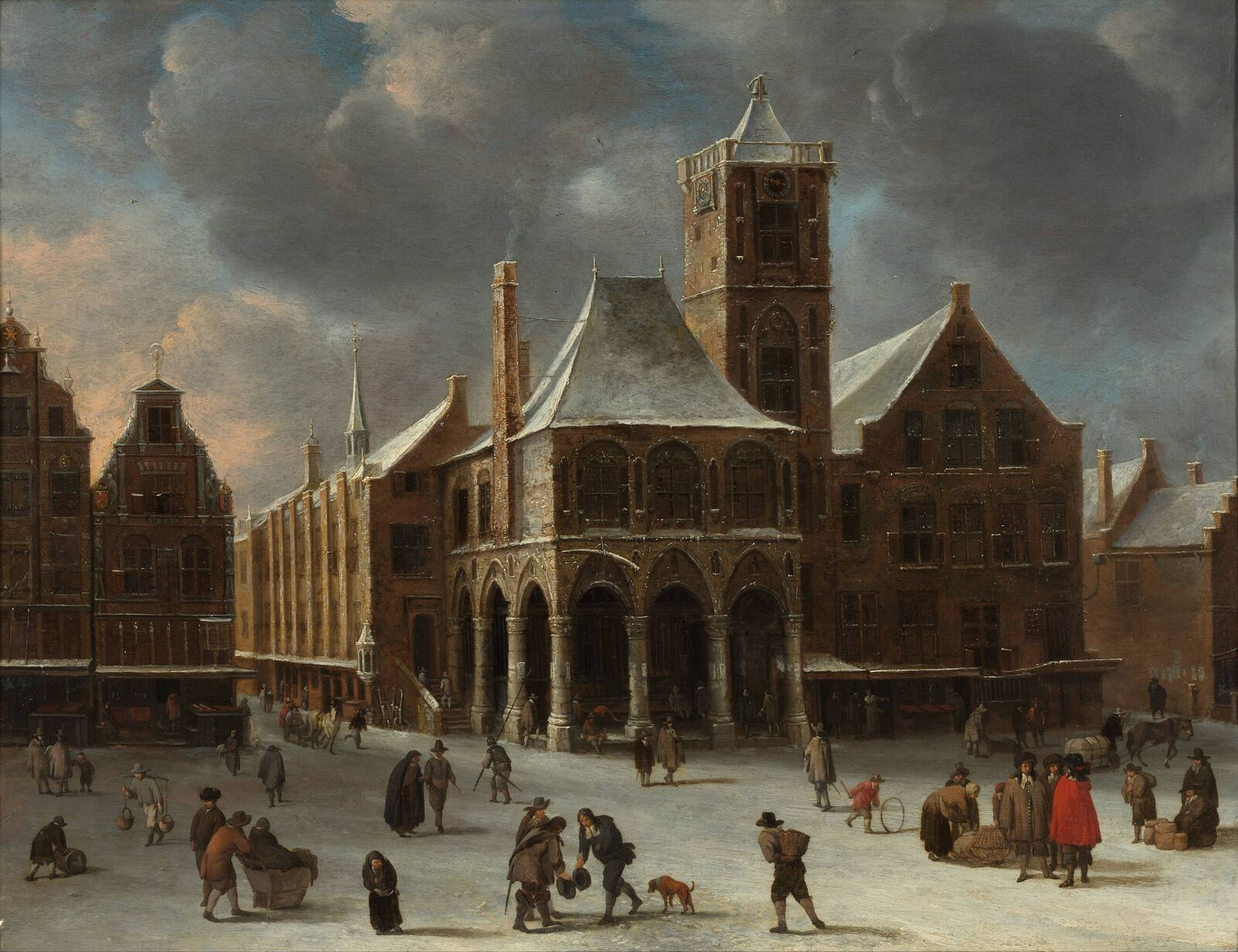
Abraham Beerstraaten & Abraham Storck Oude Stadhuis te Amsterdam
