= Abraham Storck =

Dutch painter (1644–1708)

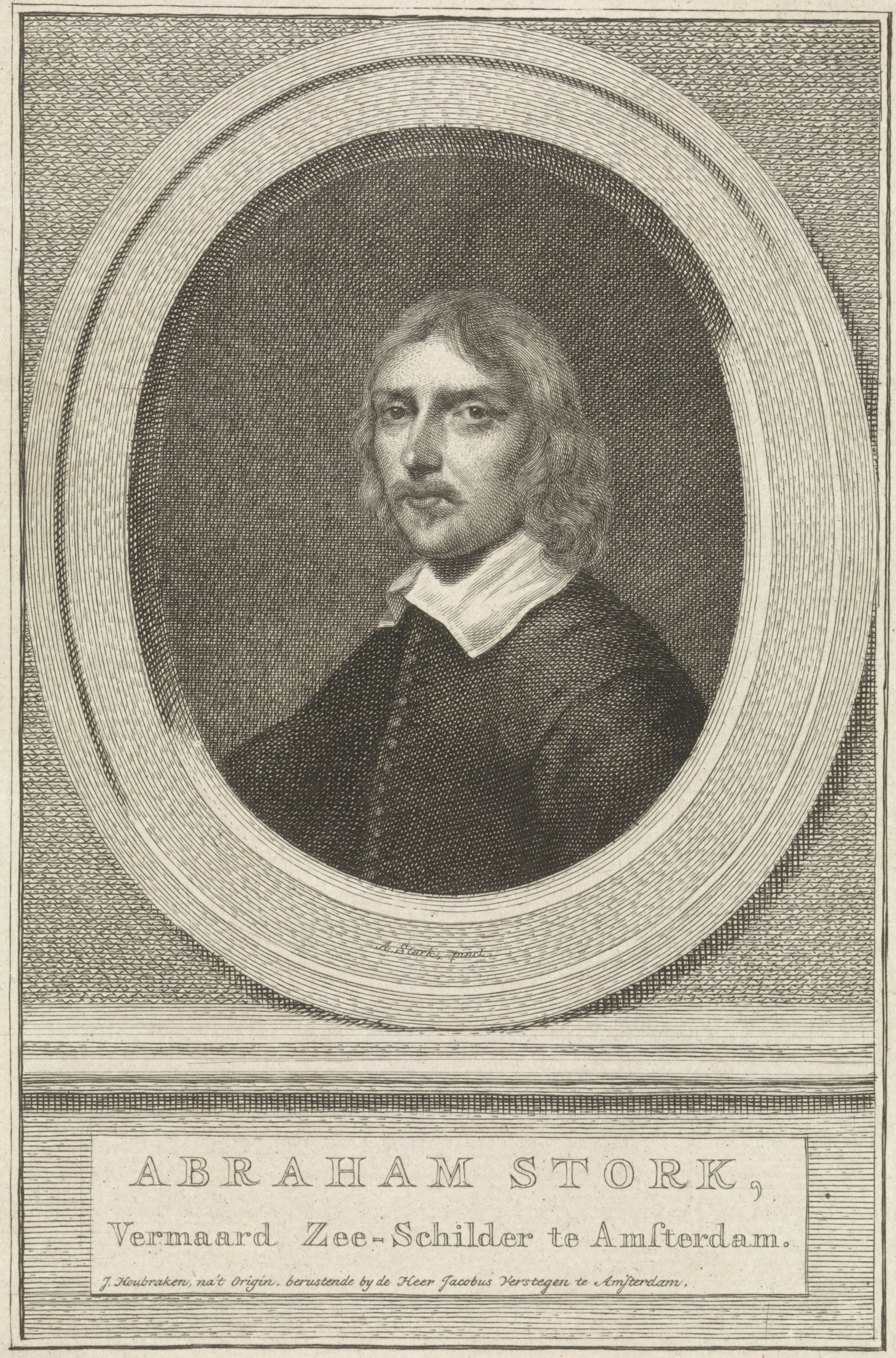
Portrait of Abraham Storck by Jacob Houbraken after design by Storck, c. 1760

Abraham Storck (or Sturckenburch; bapt. 17 April 1644 in Amsterdam – buried 8 April 1708) was a Dutch painter and draughtsman, who was known for his marine paintings, topographical views, Italianate harbour scenes and German landscapes along the Rhine. His marine scenes included sea battles, river scenes, harbours, depictions of whaling and townscapes with canals. He was further known for his depictions of festive occasions, in particular marine 'parades', such as the visit to Amsterdam of Tsar Peter the Great of Russia in 1697.

== Life ==
Storck was baptized in the Noorderkerk, a Protestant church in the Jordaan. His father was the painter Jan Jansz Storck (also called Sturck and later Johannes Sturck(en)burgh) (1603–1673), from Wesel. His mother was Teuntje (Apolonia) Jacobs. The couple had married in 1628. Storck had two older brothers, Johannes (1629–73) and Jacobus (1641–in or after 1687). They also became painters using the name Sturckenburch until c. 1688 after which they started calling themselves Storck or Sturck.

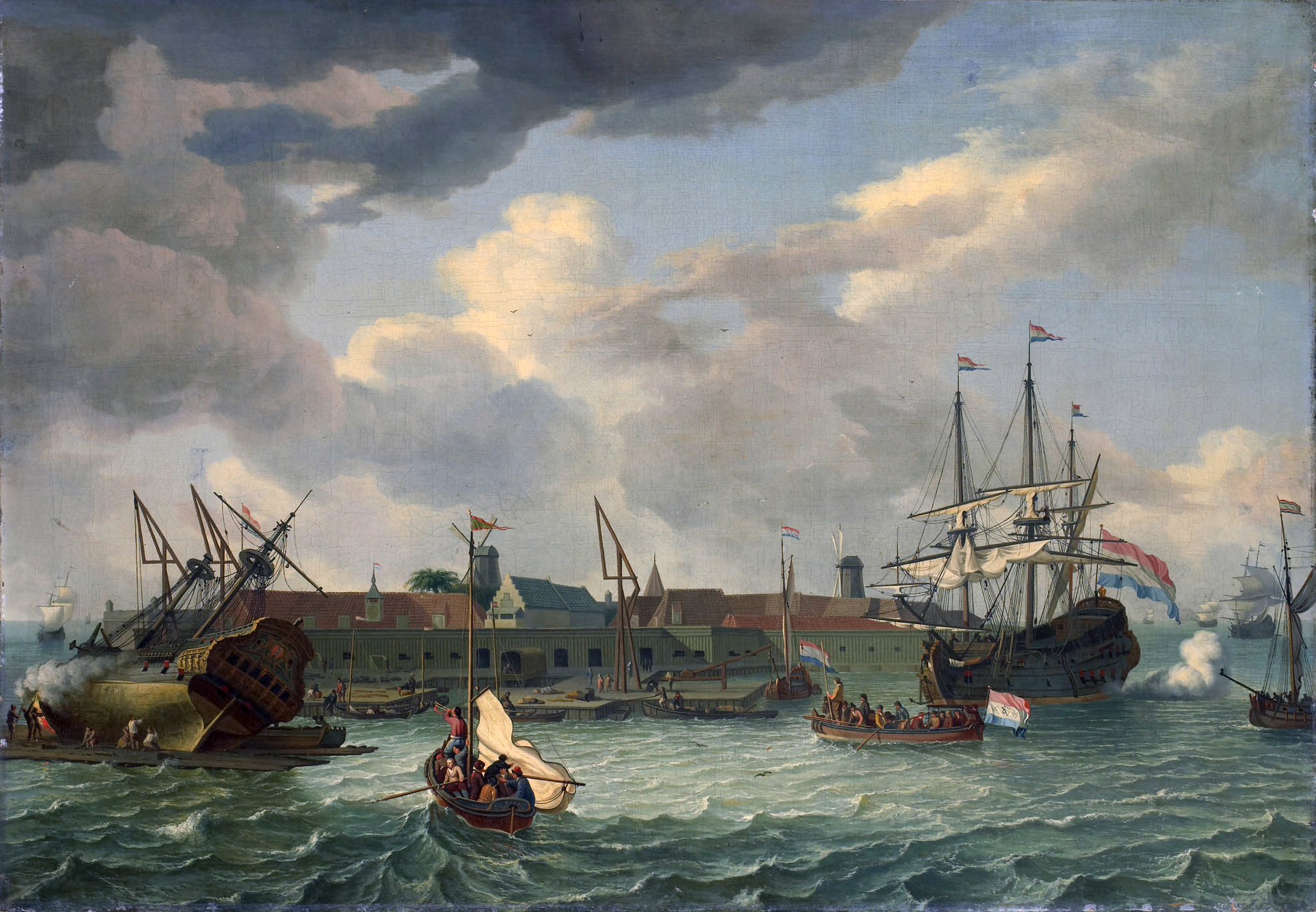
The Island of Onrust near Batavia (Jakarta), 1699

It is likely the three brothers trained with their father in the family workshop before joining the Amsterdam Guild of Saint Luke. Abraham was first registered in the list of members of the Guild in 1688.

Circa 1666 Storck established his workshop producing naval, harbor scenes as well as landscape paintings and city scapes. In 1670 he traveled with his brother Jacobus and worked in Germany. He married the widow Neeltje Pieters van Meyservelt in 1694 when he was already 49 years old.

At the end of his life he lived on Kattenburg island near the Amsterdam harbour. He was buried at the St Anthony cemetery in Amsterdam on 8 April 1708.

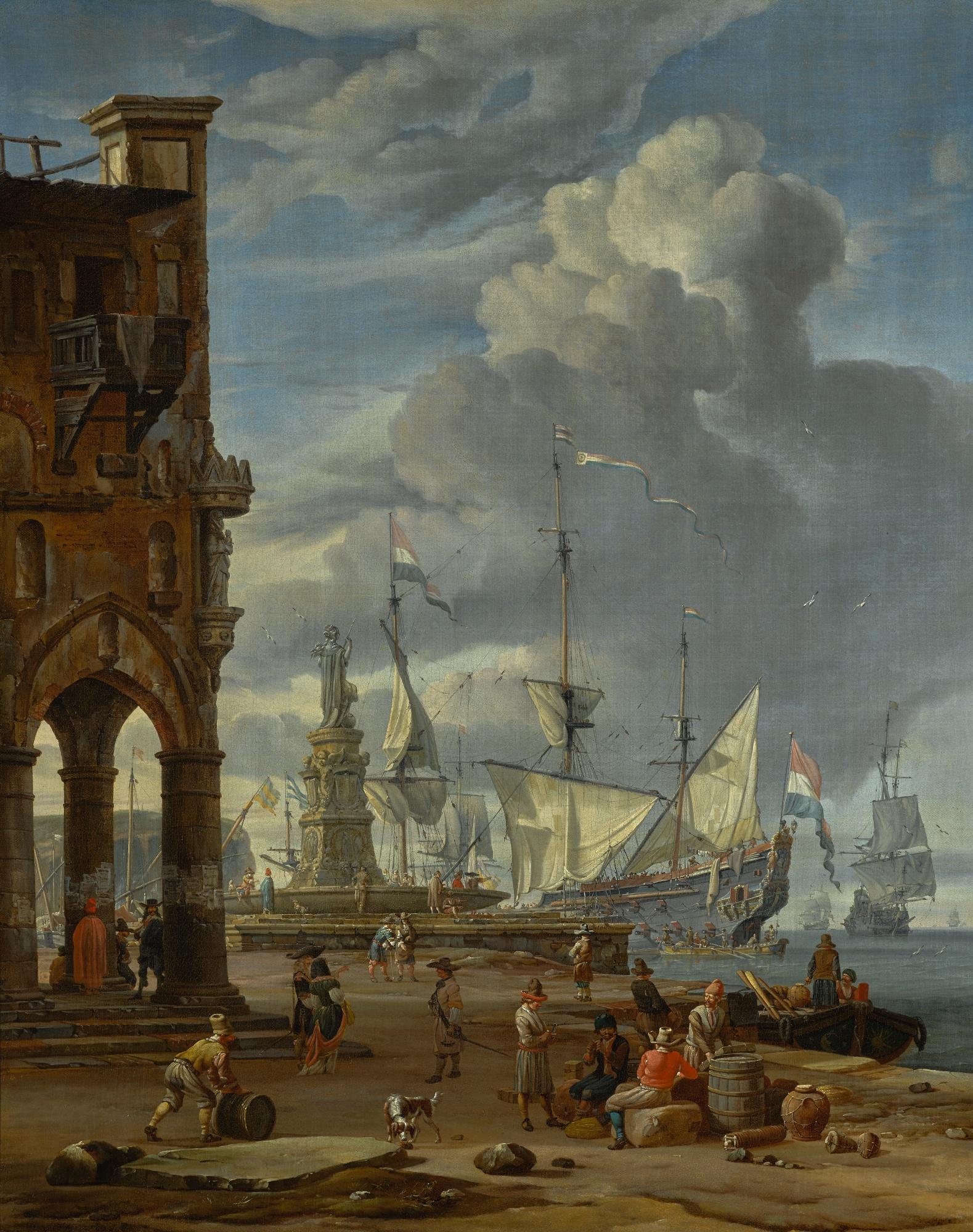
Southern port with figures on a quayside

== Work ==
Strock was a very prolific artist who produced a great number of works thanks to the large workshop he operated. He was principally a marine painter who produced works depicting the whole range of battle scenes, storms, shipwrecks, views of ships in rivers, coastal waters and harbours, marine 'parades' and whaling scenes. He further painted townscapes seen from a river or canal. He painted realistic as well as imaginary landscapes and marine scenes.

Storck's marine and river scenes were influenced by the two Willem van de Veldes (the elder and the younger), Ludolf Bakhuizen and by Jan Abrahamsz Beerstraaten.

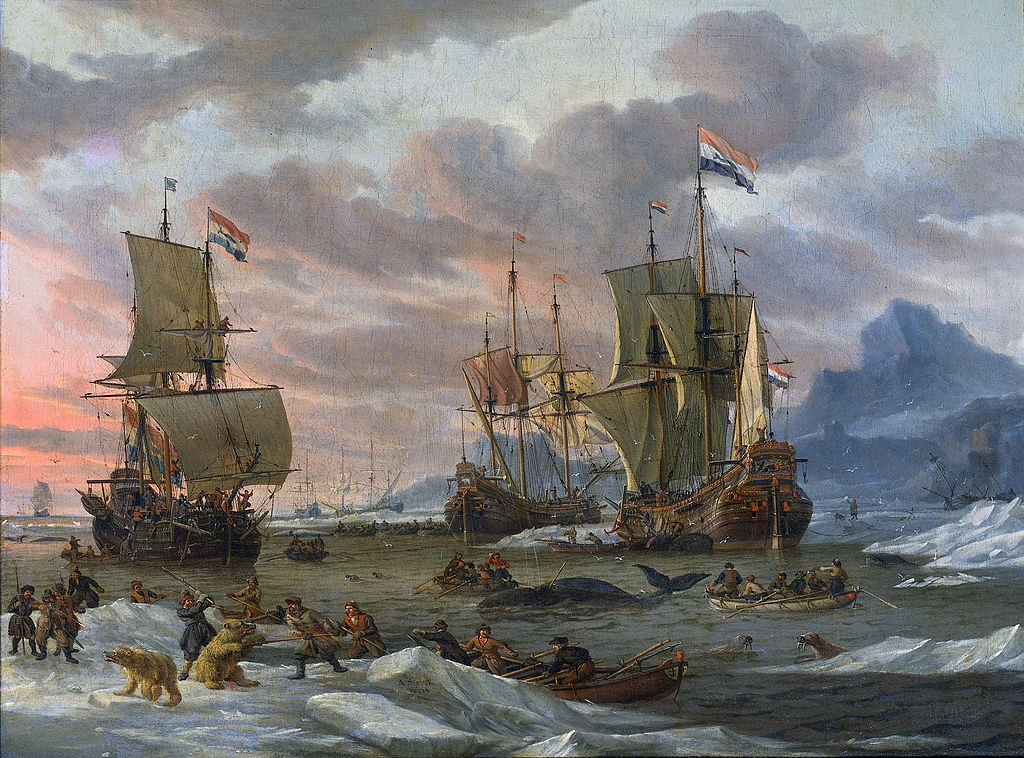
Whaling Expedition

Storck produced fantastical views of Mediterranean ports, in which merchant shipping appear amidst architectural ruins, depicted in the crystal-clear colours of Italian art of the period. This type of scene anticipated the popular 18th-century Italian capriccio. He depicted ships' rigging and technical details with considerable accuracy, which likely shows the influence of the van de Veldes. His Dutch harbour and river views often include recreational and ceremonial aspects of shipping. He paid particular attention to the display of pleasure yachts, ceremonial gatherings of ships, the passengers and bystanders.

Storck further painted some winter scenes, which were inspired by the works of Jan Abrahamsz Beerstraaten and his son Abraham Beerstraaten. He collaborated a few times with the landscape painter Thomas Heeremans who was known as a specialist in winter landscapes. An example is the Winter landscape with the Montelbaanstoren, Amsterdam dated 1676 in which Heeremans painted the winter landscape and Storck the figures.
