= Jacobus Storck =

Dutch Golden Age marine painter

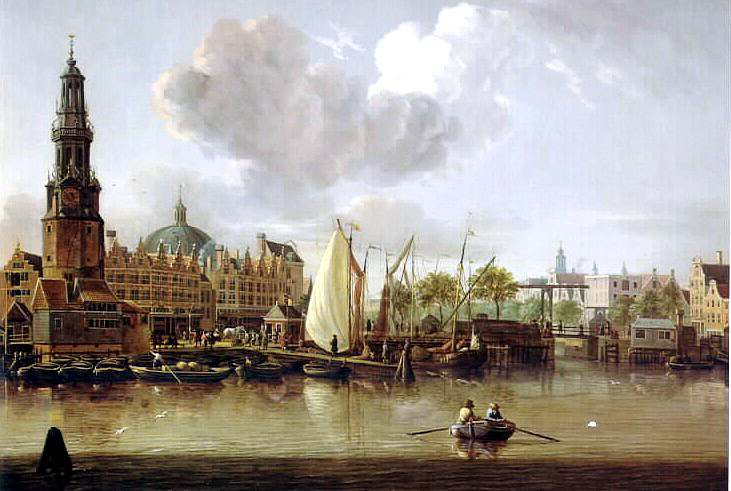
View of the Haringpakkerstoren (since demolished) and behind that the round dome of the Lutheran church on the Singel.

Jacobus Storck (8 September 1641 – c.1700) was a Dutch Golden Age marine painter.

He was born and died in Amsterdam. According to Houbraken he was the brother of the marine painter Abraham Storck who painted views of the Rhine and inland ships, but who was not as gifted.

According to the RKD he was the second son of the marine painter Johannes Sturckenburgh, younger brother of the marine painter Johannes Storck and older brother of Abraham. Signed works by him are dated 1664 to 1687. He sometimes signed JA Storck, which since 1963 has been interpreted as a work by both Jacobus and Abraham together.
