= The Castle of Muiden in Winter =

1658 painting by Jan Beerstraaten

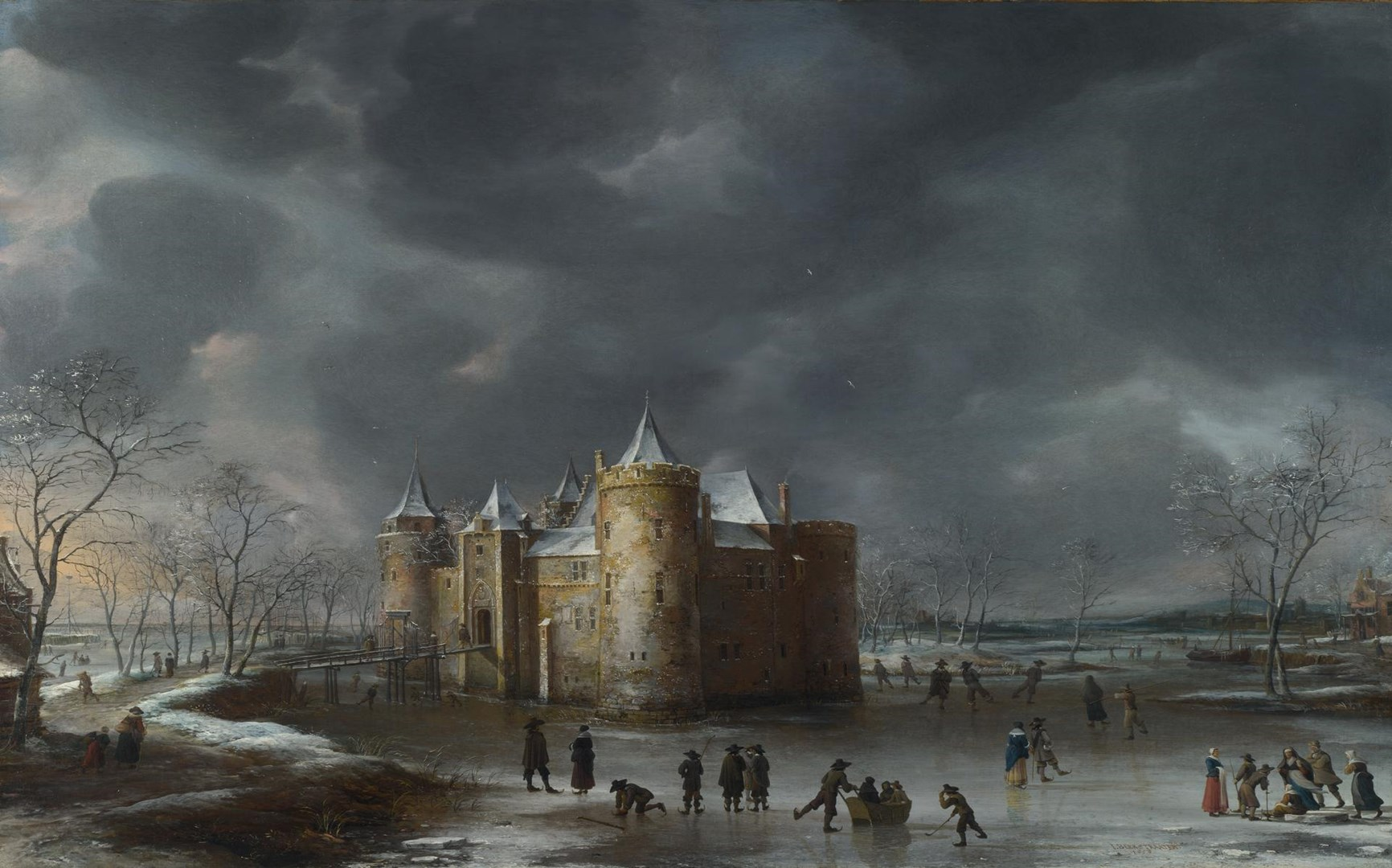
The Castle of Muiden in Winter (1658) by Jan Abrahamsz Breestraaten

The Castle of Muiden in Winter is a 1658 oil on canvas painting by Jan Abrahamsz Beerstraaten, now in the National Gallery, London, which bought it in 1890. It shows Muiden Castle near Amsterdam, with several figures ice skating in the foreground.
