= Pieter Floriszoon =

17th-century Dutch States Navy officer

- Painting of Pieter Floriszoon
- Born: Pieter Florisse Blom c. 1600 (either 1602 or 1606); Monnickendam, Dutch Republic
- Died: 8 November 1658 Near Øresund, Swedish Empire
- Buried: Grote Kerk, Hoorn
- Allegiance: Dutch Republic
- Service years: 1640–1658
- Conflicts: Portuguese Restoration War; Battle of Cape St. Vincent; First Anglo-Dutch War; Battle of Dover; Battle of the Kentish Knock; Battle of Dungeness; Battle of Portland; Battle of the Gabbard; Battle of Scheveningen; Franco-Dutch War; Battle of the Sound

Pieter Florisz (1602 or 1606 – 8 November 1658) was a Dutch States Navy officer during the 17th century. He died during the Battle of the Sound.

== History ==
Pieter Florisz was born around 1600 in Monnickendam and lived there until 1654. His father was Floris Florisz Houtcooper, a timber merchant, who also worked as a ship carpenter and started his own shipyard. His youngest brother Floris wore the name Blom or Bloem. It is not known with certainty whether Pieter also called himself or was named so. Little is known about the first forty years of his life. What is known is that he married three times and had four children who all died young. There are some brief indications that he worked for an Amsterdam shipping company that operated in the West Indies. There is more information about the last eighteen years of his life, in which he has participated in various actions and major naval battles on ships of the Dutch war fleet (as captain, bailiff at night, and Vice admiral of the Admiralty of the Noorderkwartier).

== Death ==
Pieter Floriszoon died on 8 November 1658 during the Battle of the Sound. The Danish king ordered an embalmer to embalm him with great honors and to be laid out in Denmark. On 8 November 1659, a state funeral took place in the Grote Kerk in Hoorn, where later a marble tomb was erected, a work by Pieter van Campfort, which would be largely lost in a fire in 1838. All that remains is the wooden lid of his coffin and a cracked marble image of the fatal Battle of the Sound. The Lid and image can both be seen in the Westfries Museum in Hoorn. It is said that there were no famous last words in his dying hour, only his great courage.
He was succeeded by Jan Meppel.

== See also ==
- HNLMS Pieter Florisz (1937) - Ship named after Pieter Floriszoon
