= Battle of the Sound =

1658 naval battle of the Second Northern War

Coordinates: 55°45′N 12°45′E

- Part of the Second Northern War
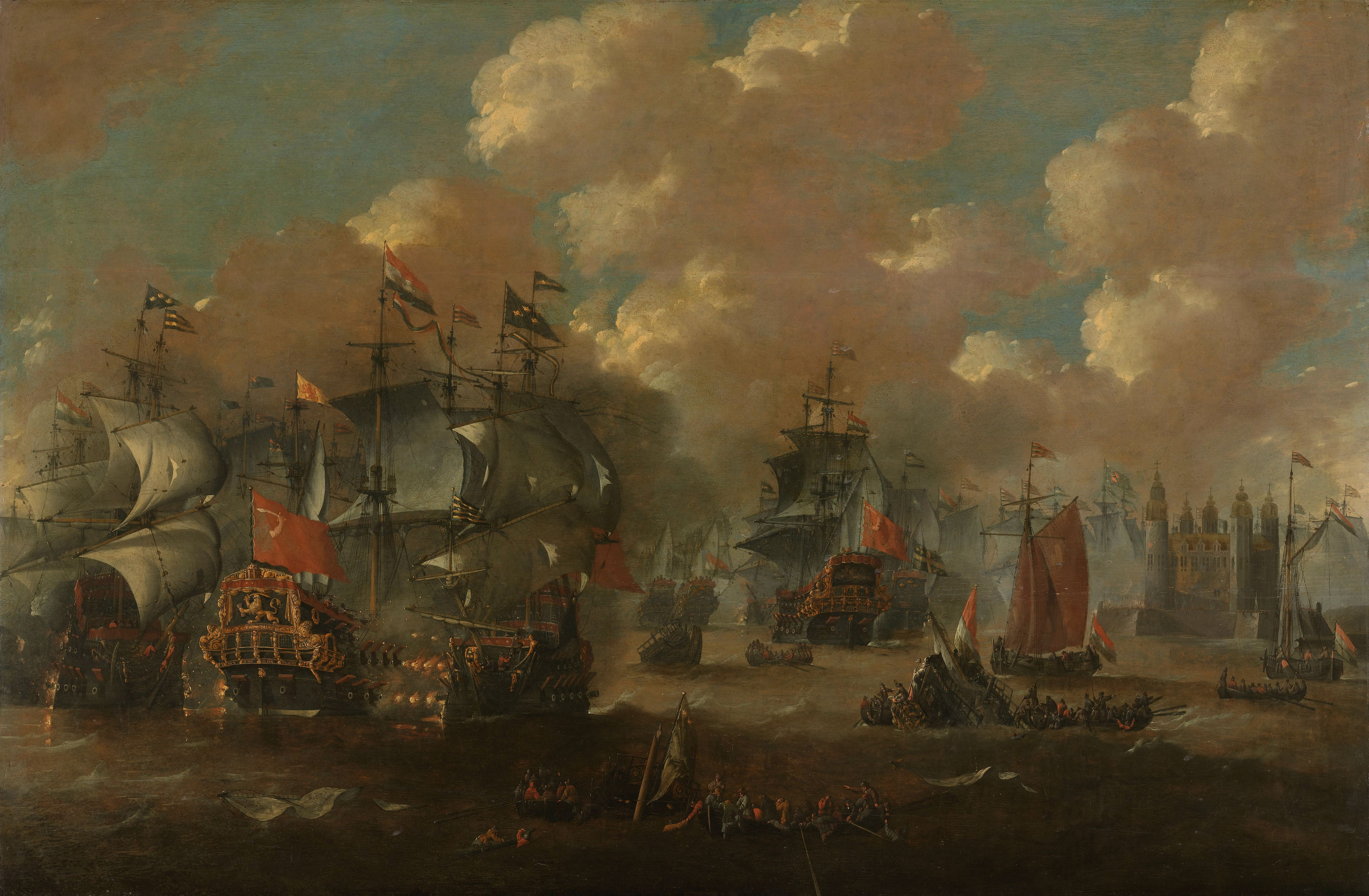
- The Battle of the Sound, by Peter van de Velde
| Date | 29 October 1658 |
| Location | Øresund, Baltic Sea |
| Result | Dutch victory |

Belligerents
| Dutch Republic | (yes) Swedish Empire |

Commanders and leaders
| (Dutch Republic) Jacob van Wassenaer Obdam (Dutch Republic) Witte de With † (Dutch Republic) Pieter Floriszoon † | (Swedish Empire) Carl Gustaf Wrangel (Swedish Empire) Klas Bjelkenstjerna |

Strength
| 41 warships | 45 warships |

Casualties and losses
| 1,400 killed, wounded and captured 1 warship sunk | 1,200 killed, wounded and captured 4 warships captured 1 warship destroyed |

The Battle of the Sound was a naval engagement which took place on 8 November 1658 (29 October O.S.) during the Second Northern War, near the Sound or Øresund, just north of the Danish capital, Copenhagen. Sweden had invaded Denmark and an army under Charles X Gustav of Sweden had Copenhagen itself under siege. The Dutch fleet was sent to prevent Sweden from gaining control of both sides of the Sound and thereby controlling access to the Baltic Sea as well as of its trade.

The Dutch, under the command of Lieutenant-Admiral Jacob van Wassenaer Obdam with Egbert Bartholomeusz Kortenaer as his flag captain, who had sailed to the Baltic in support of Denmark, had 41 ships with 1,413 guns while the Swedes, under Lord High Admiral Carl Gustaf Wrangel, had 45 ships with 1,838 guns. The Dutch were grouped into three squadrons, while the Swedes separated their ships into four. The seven Danish ships with about 280 guns were unable to assist their Dutch allies because of adverse northern winds and could only watch. Obdam initially received written instructions from the Grand Pensionary, Johan de Witt, that were very complicated and confusing to him. He requested the orders to be given to him again "in three words", with de Witt replying with a single sentence: "Save Copenhagen and punch in the face anyone who tries to prevent it". The "anyone" was a reference to the English, whose powerful fleet had recently defeated the Dutch in the First Anglo-Dutch War, leading to the Dutch suspecting an English fleet present might come to the aid of the Swedish, although the English simply observed the fighting from a distance, being allied to neither side.

The Swedes attacked aggressively, but failed to gain the upper hand, primarily because the approaching Dutch had the weather gage. The Dutch forced the Swedish fleet to end the blockade of the Danish capital, enabling its resupply by Dutch armed transport ships, which eventually forced Charles Gustav to abandon the siege entirely.

The Swedes lost five ships in the action compared to one Dutch ship, however, the remaining allied ships were more damaged. Also, considering the slightly fewer losses of men in the Swedish navy, 1,200 compared to 1,400 (439 killed, 269 captured and slightly more than 650 wounded allies), the battle is considered a tactical draw. Strategically, however, it was a major allied victory.

== Background ==
The peace in Roskilde 27 February 1658 lasted only a short time. On August 7 of the same year, Charles X Gustav's troops landed again on Zealand. The stronghold of Kronborg near Elsinore fell, as did most of Denmark. Charles Gustav had started this second Danish war with the aim of wiping out Denmark both in name and kingdom. Copenhagen began to be besieged. The Dutch ambassador in Copenhagen was worried about the future. During the 17th century, the Dutch Republic was a sailing nation with great trade interests; not least in the Baltic Sea. If Denmark fell, the only sea connection with this sea would be completely controlled by Sweden.

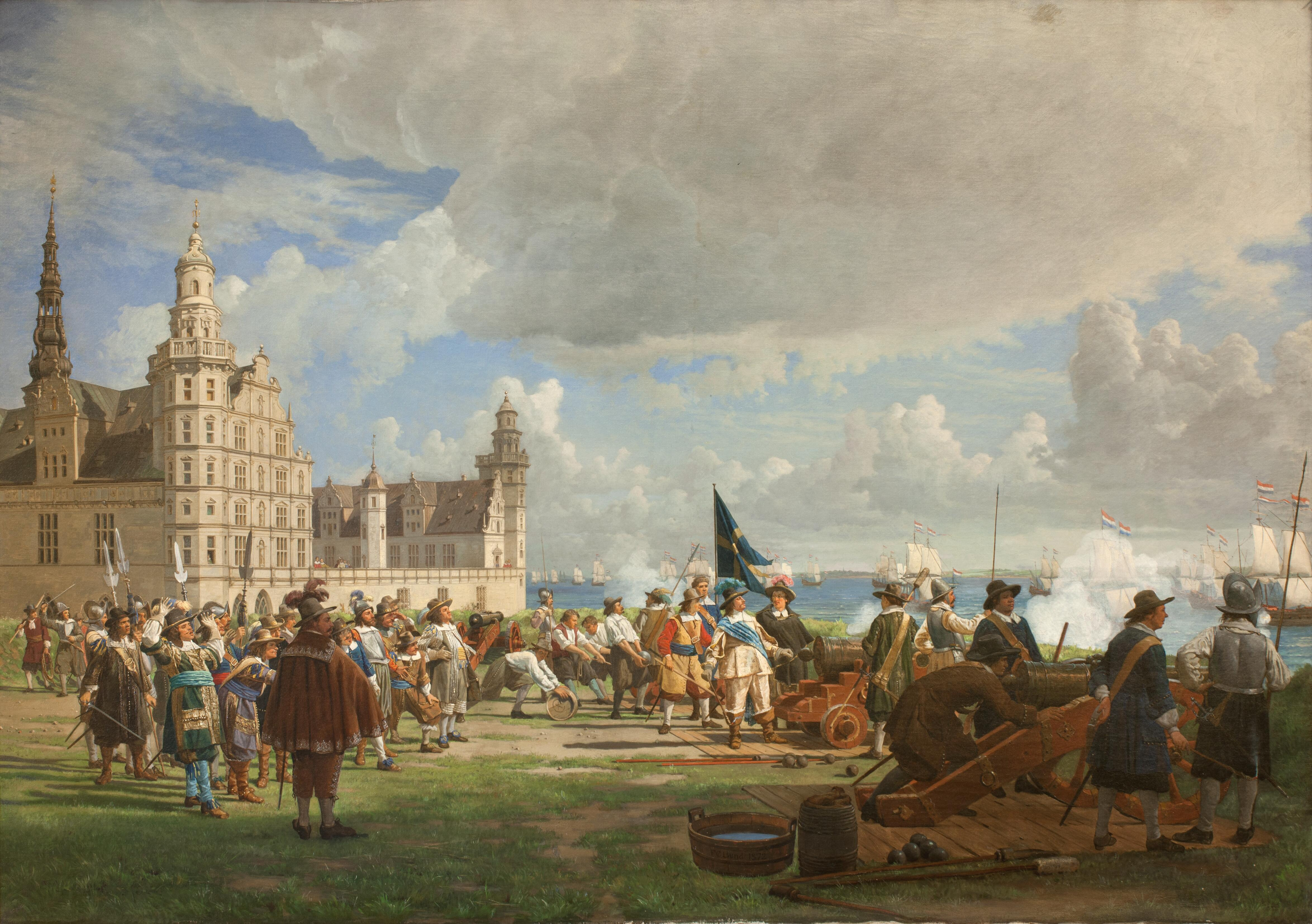
The Dutch fleet, led by admiral Obdam, enters the Sound on October 29, 1658

The Dutch acted quickly. On October 7, 1658, the large Dutch fleet set sail and nineteen days later, anchors were lowered north of the Sound, at a base called "Lappen". From Kullaberg in northwestern Scania, the Swedes reported the number of enemy ships; 39 warships and 8 transport ships with soldiers and provisions to the trapped Copenhagen. A fleet of 1,278 guns, 4,501 sailors and 1,000 soldiers were waiting for the right weather. Down in the Sound, by the island of Ven, the Swedish fleet consisted of 31 warships, 14 armored merchant ships, 1,838 guns and 6,649 men.

== Battle ==
At dawn on October 29, the Dutch eased anchor. A favorable and strong northwesterly wind was blowing. The Dutch Admiral Jacob Obdam's order was to reach the closed Copenhagen. Jacob Obdam, however, had personal problems. Paralyzed by gout, sitting on an armchair on deck, he was allowed to lead the battle from his admiral ship Eendracht.

Charles X Gustav stood with his staff on the ramparts of Kronborg Castle. In the end, the king hoped that the Dutch would side with the Swedes and greet Kronborg with a salute. That did not happen. The Dutch ships sailed along the Scanian coast. Helsingborg's lake bastions opened fire and in response received heavy fire. At eight o'clock in the morning, the two admiral ships closed in on each other. On board the Swedish Victoria was the Swedish Admiral Wrangel. Before the battle, Admiral Obdam had ordered the Swedes' masts, tackles and trains to be aimed at. Victoria soon became unmanageable in this way:

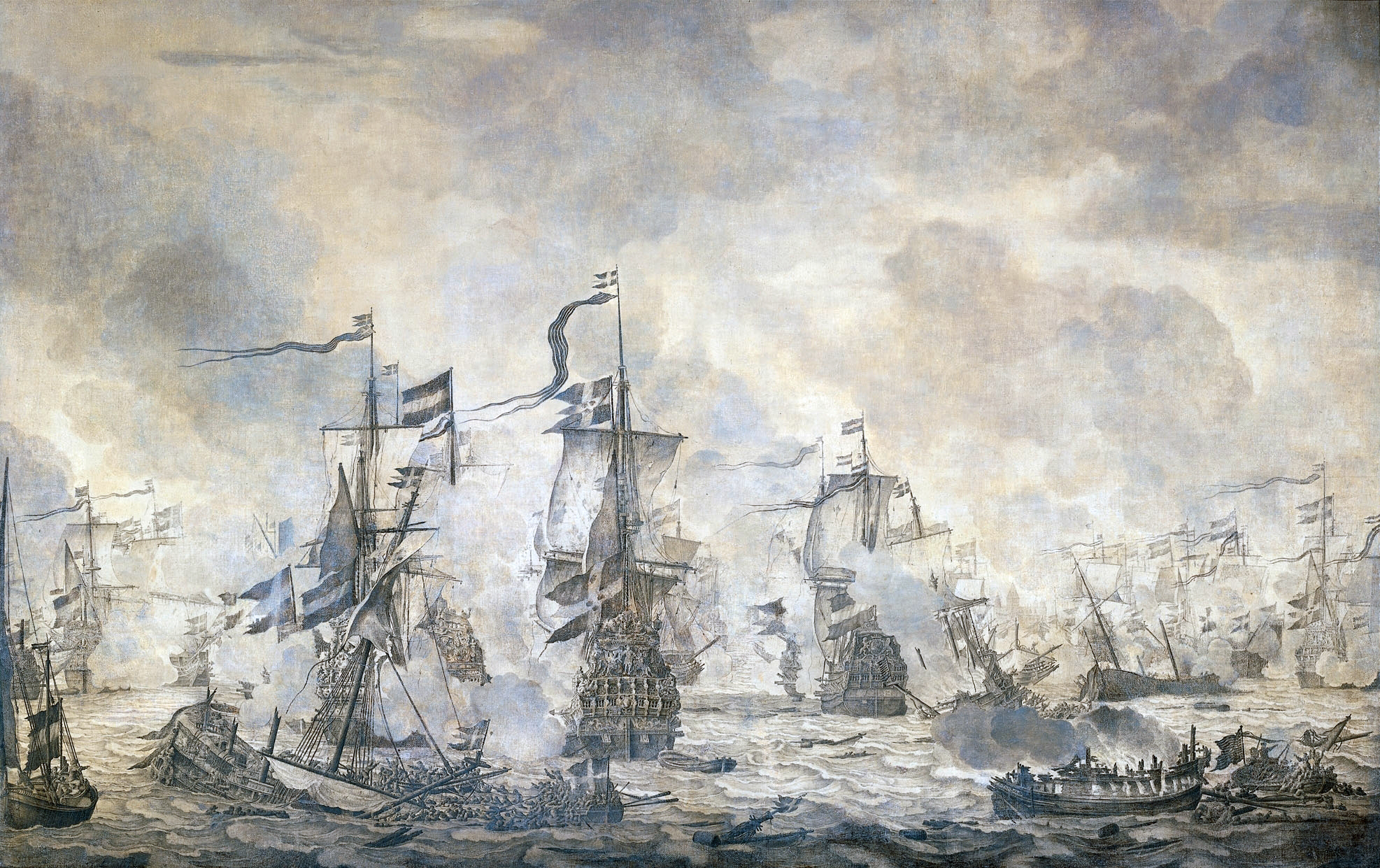
Battle of the Sound by Willem van de Velde the Elder.

"The admiral's ship Victoria was in a heavy fencing to such an extent disgraced and tormented that it could not go forward, backward, or overstays, preferably while its mezzanine rod was fired at in the middle." Wrangel was forced to interrupt the battle and the ship drifted helplessly across the strait towards Elsinore.

The battle took place over the entire water surface north of the island of Ven. The Swedes suffered heavy losses. Some Swedish ships ran aground on the Scanian coast. The Dutch had boarded and captured the ships Rose, Delmenhorst and Pelikanen with blank weapons. Svenska Morgonstiernan sank after being pierced by Dutch fire. On the Swedish Leopard, almost the entire crew of 153 men were unable to fight. Captain Anders Crabath stranded the ship off the coast of Ven.

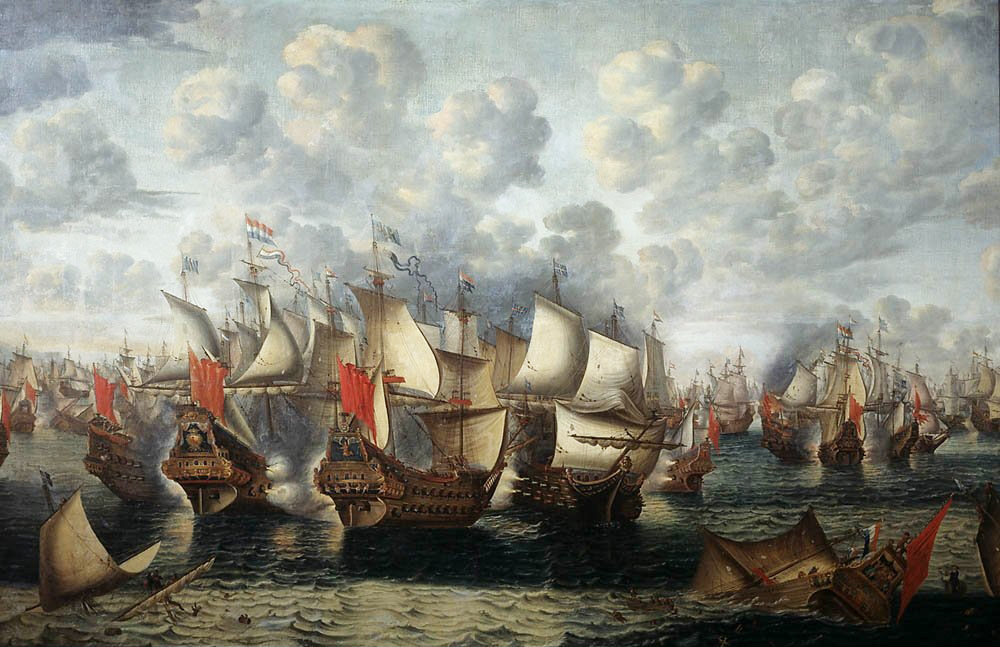
First Phase of the Battle of the Sound, Jan Abrahamsz Beerstraaten

The Dutch also suffered losses. Swedish Admiral Klas Hansson Bjelkenstjerna on the 60-gun ship Draken met the Dutch Vice Admiral Witte de With on the 54-gun ship Brederode. Fire broke out on both ships. "Eventually the Swedish ship Wismar also came to it, lay down in front of the bow and thus the Dutchman was overpowered since the vice admiral with quite a lot of people up there was shot dead, the flag on it was taken down and it finally sank under the landside of Zealand."

Admiral Obdam's ship Eendracht threatened to sink. The Admiral's flag had to therefore be transferred to another ship. Unable to move from his chair, the admiral was hoisted over to another ship.

South of Ven, several ships sank. In Swedish diary entries, it is noted that in the days after the battle, several flagpoles from masts could be seen sticking out above the water surface.

== Aftermath ==
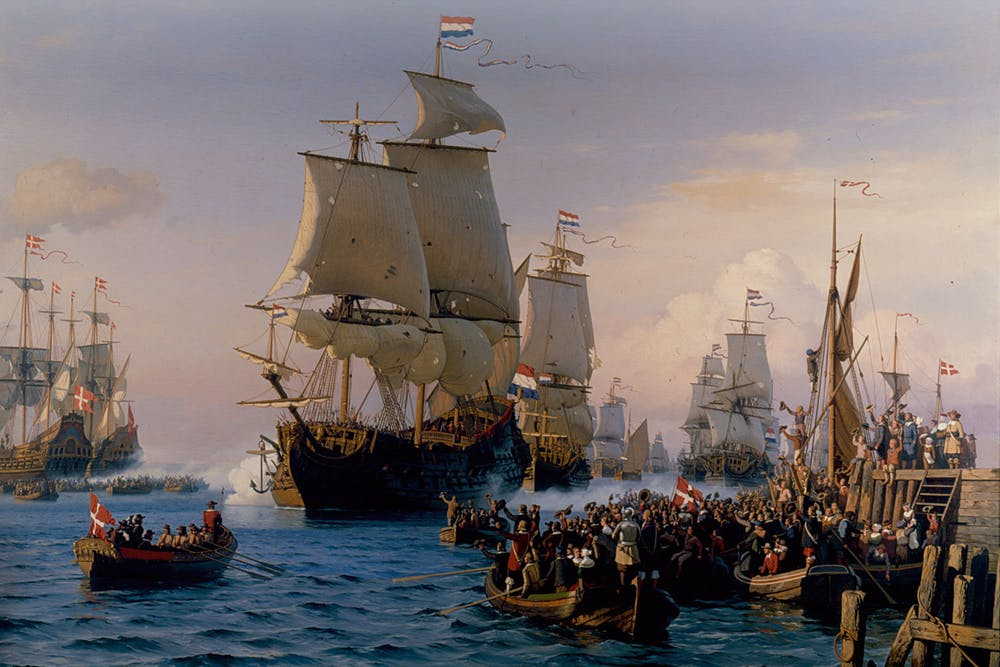
The Dutch fleet relieves Copenhagen

The Dutch broke through the Swedish blockade and were able to unite with the trapped Danish fleet in Copenhagen. The Danes had tried to reach the battle, but the strong headwind had prevented this. While ringing all the church bells in Copenhagen, the badly damaged Dutch ships slid towards the city. With the naval victory, the end was approaching for Charles Gustav's claim to power in Denmark.

Charles Gustav had seen the whole battle from land. Afterwards, the king personally boarded the badly wounded admiral's ship. In the morning, the day after the battle, orders were given that the damaged Swedish fleet would soon seek refuge in the deep channel next to Landskrona's fortress.

From Elsinore they set sail for Landskrona. Outside Ven it became windless. Admiral Wrangel then ordered that the ships be towed by hand into the protection of the fortress' cannons. In the morning of October 31, most of the ships had reached safety in this way. At the same time, a strong southerly wind began to blow. The Danes lightened sails and some Swedish ships were forced to flee north into the strait. Captain Speck on Swedish Amaranth turned on the enemy; with his 36 cannons he managed to delay the Danish ships Hannibal and Graa Ulff by a total of 86 cannons.

When anchored in Landskrona, the Swedish Sword ran aground. The ship capsized and sank, full of sick and wounded, many of whom drowned.

== Ship lists ==
Dutch Republic This page contains slightly different details for the Dutch ships
| Ship name | Guns | Notes |
Van (Vice Admiral Witte de With)
| Brederode (de With) | 59 | Ran aground, captured by Wismar and sank; de With killed |
| Landman | 40 | |
| Zeeridder | 22 | |
| Princesse Louise | 32 | |
| Cogge | 40 | |
| Windhont | 23 | |
| Prins Willem | 28 | |
| Wapen van Medemblick | 36 | |
| Groningen | 36 | |
Center (Lt. Admiral Jacob van Wassenaer Obdam)
| Eendracht (Obdam) | 72 | |
| Rotterdam | 52 | |
| Zon | 40 | |
| Wapen van Rotterdam | 40 | |
| Wapen van Dordrecht | 40 | |
| Halve Maen | 40 | |
| Duyvenvoorde | 40 | |
| Stavoren | 40 | |
| Deutecom | 24 | |
| Waegh | 40 | |
| Gouden Leeuw | 38 | |
| Hoorn | 28 | |
| Princes Albertina | 36 | |
Rear (Vice Admiral Pieter Floriszoon)
| Jozua (Floriszoon) | 50 | Pieter Floriszoon killed |
| Breda | 28 | Captured but abandoned and recaptured |
| Jupiter | 32 | |
| Alkmaar | 36 | |
| Westfriesland | 28 | |
| Wapen van Holland | 38 | |
| Eendracht | 38 | |
| Caleb | 40 | |
| Jonge Prins | 30 | |
| Wapen van Monnickendam | 26 | |
Transports
| Judith | 24 | |
| Vergulden Haen | 16 | |
| Liefde | 24 | |
| Medea | 24 | |
| Perel | 23 | |
| Fruytboom | 23 | |
Denmark
| Ship name | Guns | Notes |
Danish Squadron (Bjelke)
| Trefoldighed (Bjelke) | 66 | |
| Tre Løver | 60 | |
| Norske Løve | 48 | |
| Hannibal | 44 | |
| Graa Ulv | 36 | |
| Johannes | 20 | |
| Hojenhald | 8 | |
Sweden
| Ship name | Guns | Notes |
1st squadron (Sjohjelm)
| Cesar (Sjohjelm) | 54 | |
| Amarant | 46 | |
| Apollo | 46 | |
| Wismar | 44 | |
| Vestervik | 40 | |
| Fides | 36 | |
| Hjort | 36 | |
| Södermanland | 38 | |
| Svan | 38 | |
| Östergötland | 36 | |
| Halfmåne | 28 | |
2nd squadron (Carl Gustaf Wrangel and Strussflycht)
| Victoria (C.G. Wrangel) | 74 | |
| Måne | 46 | |
| Merkurius | 46 | |
| Mars | 44 | |
| Svärd | 44 | |
| Pelican | 40 | Captured by Wapen van Rotterdam |
| Örn | 38 | |
| Samson | 32 | |
| Morgonstjerna (merchantman) | 48 | Captured by Eendracht |
| Goteborgsfalk (merchantman) | 24 | |
| Krona | 68 | |
3rd squadron (Bjelkenstjerna)
| Drake (Bjelkenstjerna) | 66 | |
| Carolus | 54 | |
| Falk | 40 | |
| Nordstjerna | 40 | |
| Delmenhorst | 36 | Captured by Hollandia and Wapen van Medemblik |
| Leopard | 36 | Damaged by Brederode; burnt after action |
| Rafael | 36 | |
| Samson | 36 | |
| Jägare | 26 | |
| Konung David (merchantman) | 42 | |
| St Johannes (merchantman) | 36 | |
| Kalmarkastell (merchantman) | 32 | |
4th squadron (G. Wrangel)
| Hercules (G. Wrangel) | 58 | |
| Maria | 46 | |
| Småland | 46 | |
| Svenska Lejon | 40 | |
| Svan | 36 | |
| Fenix | 30 | |
| Fortuna | 30 | |
| Salvator | 30 | |
| Hök | 28 | |
| Rose (merchantman) | 40 | Captured by Landman |
| Ångermanland (merchantman) | 20 | |
