= Battle of Colberger Heide =

1644 battle of the Torstenson War

- Part of the Torstenson War
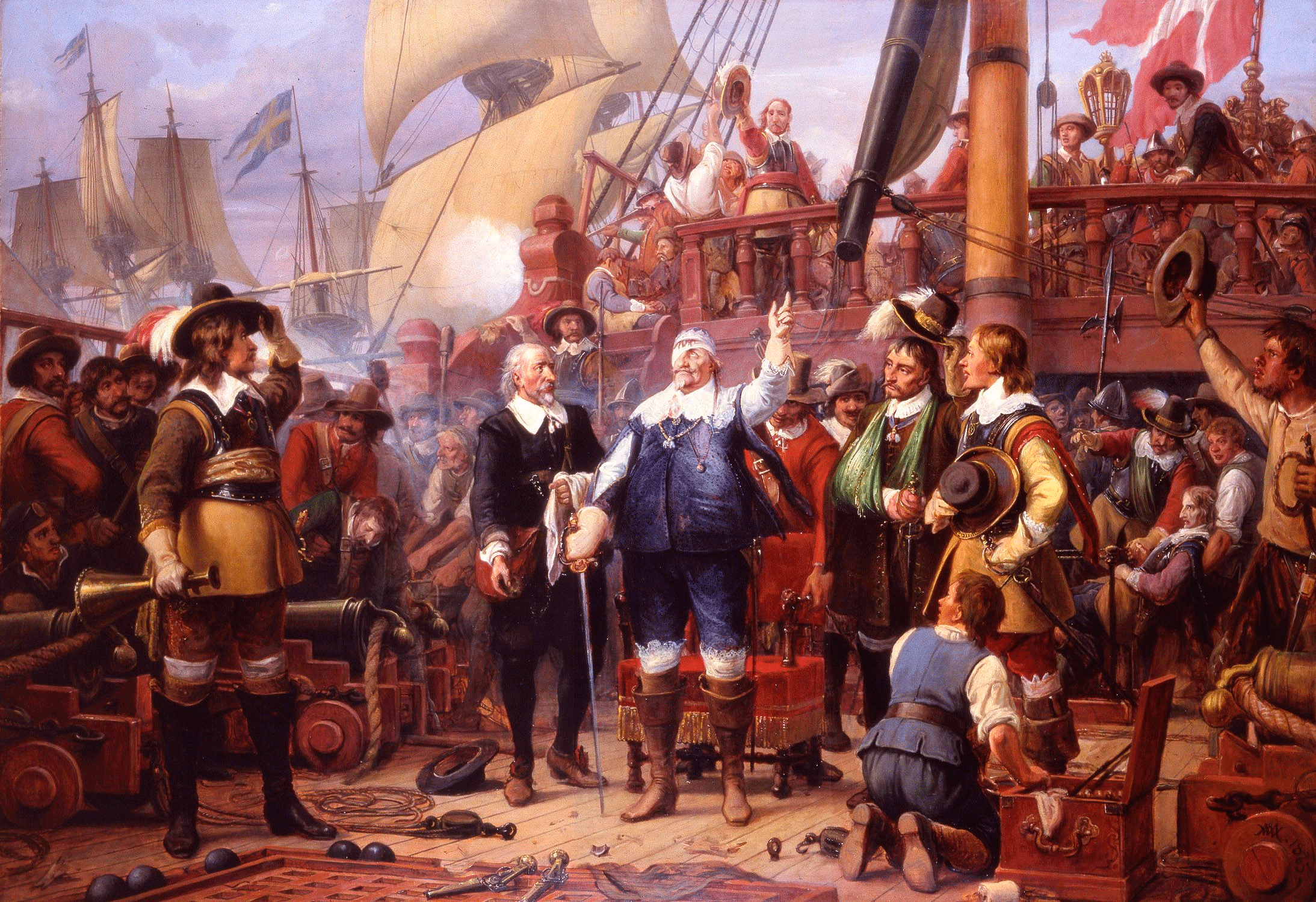
- Battle of Kolberg Heath, Wilhelm Marstrand
Date	1 July 1644
Location	Off Fehmarn, Baltic Sea
Result	See § Outcome

Belligerents
Denmark–Norway	Swedish Empire

Commanders and leaders
Christian IV (WIA) (Denmark–Norway) Jørgen Vind †	Klas Fleming; Klas Bjelkenstjerna

Strength
40 warships	34 warships

Casualties and losses
207 killed and wounded	101 killed and wounded

The Battle of Colberger Heide (also Kolberger Heide or Colberg Heath) took place on 1 July 1644 during the Torstenson War, off the coast of Schleswig-Holstein. The battle was indecisive, but a minor success for the Dano-Norwegian fleet commanded by Jørgen Vind, assisted by Grabow and King Christian IV, over a Swedish fleet commanded by Klas Fleming, assisted by Ulfsparre and Bjelkenstjerna.

== Course of the battle ==
The Dano-Norwegian fleet consisted of 40 ships with about 927 guns, and the Swedish fleet consisted of 34 ships with 1018 guns and 7 fireships.

The Dano-Norwegian fleet, coming from the east, and the Swedish fleet, coming from the west, met just north of the island of Fehmarn (Femern). The Swedes turned and sailed south along the west side of Fehmarn, inshore of a shoal, while the Danes followed a little further offshore. The Swedes turned north and swung around before resuming their westward course alongside the Danes. As the battle progressed the fleets turned before the wind, north and then back east south of the island of Langeland. As they approached the island of Lolland the Swedes turned south and eventually ended up in Kiel Bay while the Danes continued south-east, anchoring to the east of Fehmarn.

== Casualties ==
Neither side had lost a ship. Dano-Norwegian casualties were 37 killed and 170 wounded, and Swedish casualties were 32 killed and 69 wounded. Among the Dano-Norwegian casualties were commander Jørgen Vind, who died of his wounds soon after the battle, and the king, whose wounds included the loss of an eye.

== Outcome ==
The exact result of the battle is disputed by historians. Some claim that the battle ended with a Dano-Norwegian victory, with others claiming that it ended inconclusively.

== Impact ==
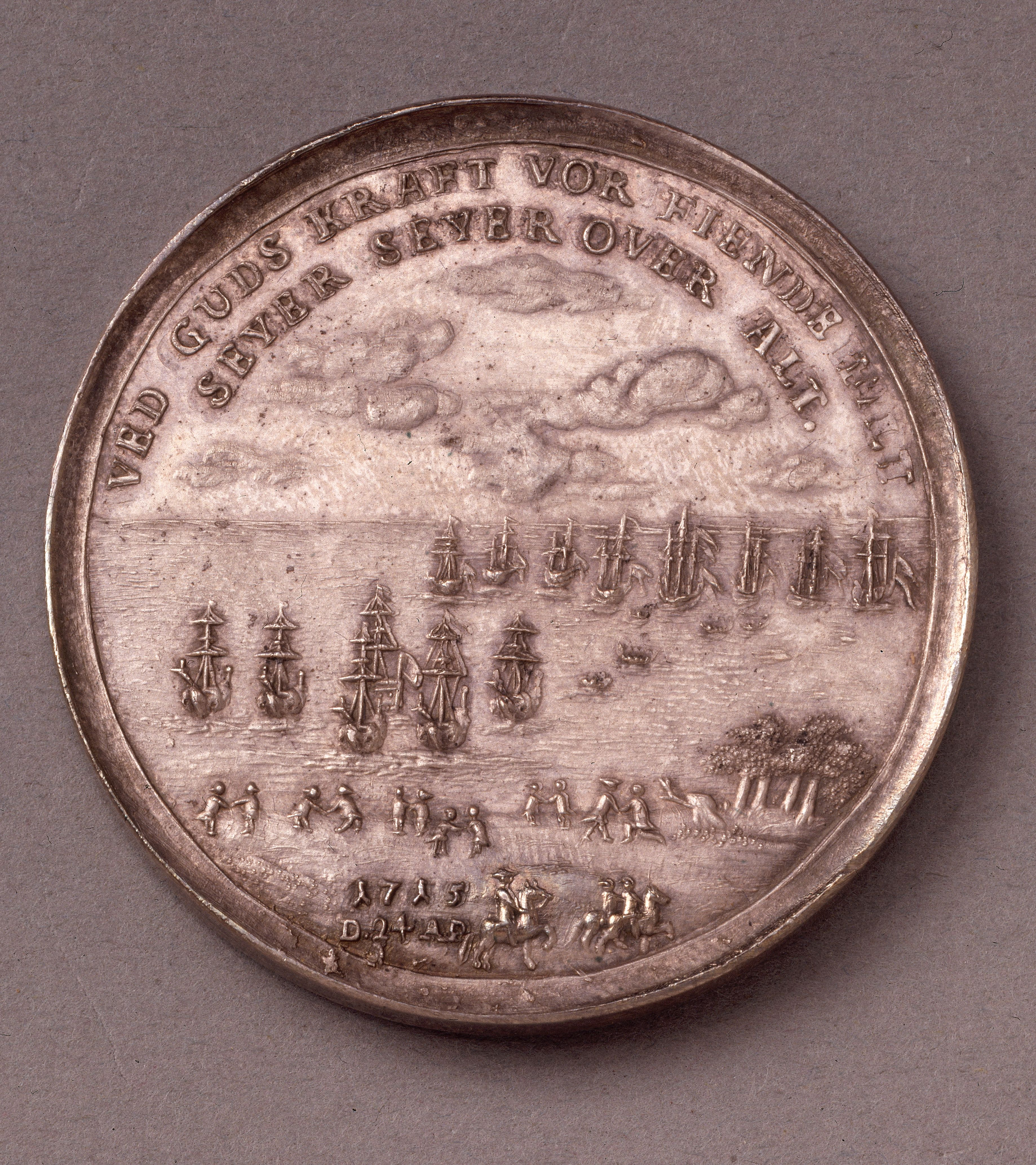
A Danish 1715 medal commemorating the battle.

While the Dano-Norwegian fleet gained a minor success when it subsequently managed to incarcerate the Swedish fleet at the Bay of Kiel, the battle was not decisive: in a subsequent encounter, the Dano-Norwegian navy was utterly defeated off the Fehmarn coast. The significance of the battle lies rather in it being retrospectively perceived as the last Dano-Norwegian victory over her long-time adversary, Sweden, in the two countries' struggle for control of the dominium maris baltici, as well as the heroization of the Dano-Norwegian king's personal commitment during the battle, memorized in the famous Marstrand painting and the first lines of the Danish royal anthem Kong Christian stod ved højen mast.

== List of ships involved ==
=== Denmark-Norway ===
First Squadron:

- Patientia 48 (1st Sq. flag)
- Oldenborg 42
- Stormar 32 (Henrik Mund)
- Fides 28
- Svan 26 (Lucas Henriksen)
- Prinds Christian (merchantman)
- Lam 16
- Havhest 14
- Jomfrusvend 6
- Ørn 4

Second Squadron:

- Tre Løver 46
- Lindorm 38
- Kronet Fisk 20
- Emanuel (merchantman)
- Forgyldte Stokfisk (merchantman)
- S. Jacob (merchantman)
- S. Peter (merchantman)
- Hvide Björn 14
- Sorte Björn 14
- Postillion 14

Third Squadron:

- Trefoldighed 48 (3rd Sq. flag)
- Pelican 36
- Graa Ulv 30
- Norske Løve 30
- Neptunus 28
- Sorte Rytter 24
- Tvende Løver 22
- Josua (merchantman)
- Hollandske Fregat 12
- Højenhald 8

Fourth Squadron:

- St Sophia 40 (4th Sq. flag)
- Tre Kroner 30 (Corfits Ulfeldt)
- Delmenhorst 28 (Hans Knudsen)
- Nelleblad 24
- Røte Gans (merchantman)
- Unge Ulv (merchantman)
- Markat 16
- Gak Med 12
- Samsons Gallej 9
- Flyvende Hjort 8

The Dano-Norwegian merchant ships averaged around 20 guns each.

=== Sweden ===
Van:

- Scepter 58 (Van flag)
- Drake 40
- Göteborg 36
- Leopard 36
- Rafael 36
- Jupiter 34
- Regina 34 (Abraham Duquesne)
- Smålands Lejon 32
- Katta 22
- Tiger 18
- Måne 16
- 2 fireships

Center:

- Krona 68 (Center flag)
- Nyckel 34
- Stockholm 34
- Samson 32
- Apollo 26
- Merkurius 26
- Salvator 26
- Vestervik 26
- Vestgöta Lejon 26
- Rekompens 22
- Svan 22
- St Jakob 12
- 2 fireships

Rear:

- Göta Ark 72 (Rear flag)
- Svärd 32
- Mars 30
- Andromeda 26
- Jägare 26
- Vesterviks Fortuna 24
- Akilles 22
- Enhorn 18
- Falk 18
- Gamla Fortuna 18
- Papegoja 12
- 3 fireships

The fireships were named Meerman, Caritas, Meerweib, Bona, Jungru, St Mikael and 1 other. 4 had previously been used as horse transports and were barely ready.
