= Jan Abrahamsz Beerstraaten =

Dutch painter

- Baptised: 31 May 1622
- Died: 1 July 1666; Amsterdam
- Occupation: Painter
- Children: Abraham Beerstraaten

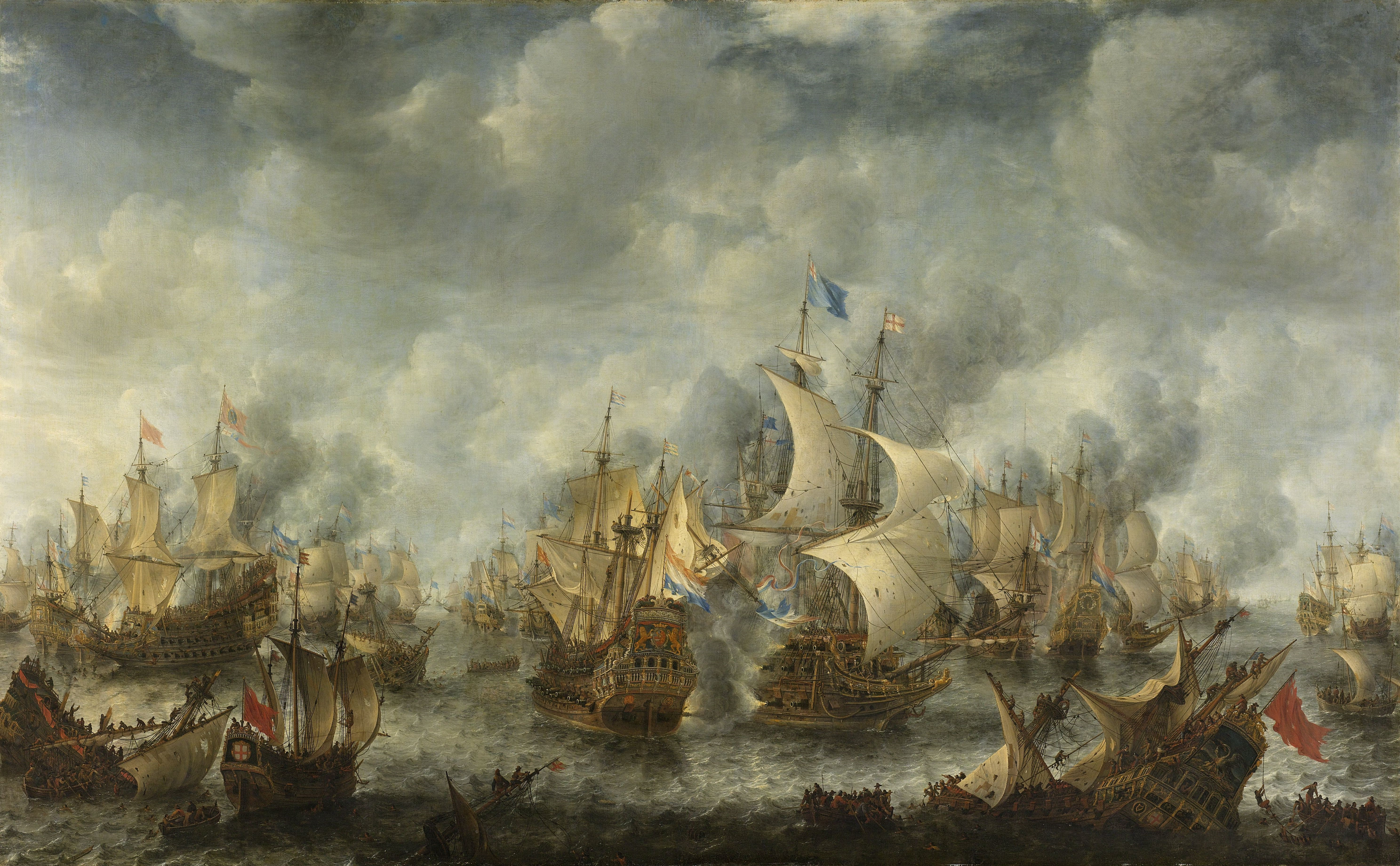
The Battle of Scheveningen, 10 August 1653 by Jan Abrahamsz Beerstraaten, painted c. 1654, depicts the final battle of the First Anglo-Dutch War (National Maritime Museum)

Jan Abrahamsz Beerstraaten or Johannes (Beerstrat or Bierstraten) (bapt. 31 March 1622 in Amsterdam – 1 July 1666) was a Dutch painter of marine art, particularly of events of the First Anglo-Dutch War and Dutch-Swedish War. Van Beerstraten depicted ports (Civitavecchia) and cityscapes of Amsterdam, as well as many cities and villages in the Netherlands. He captured castles, churches and other buildings that no longer exist.

== Biography ==
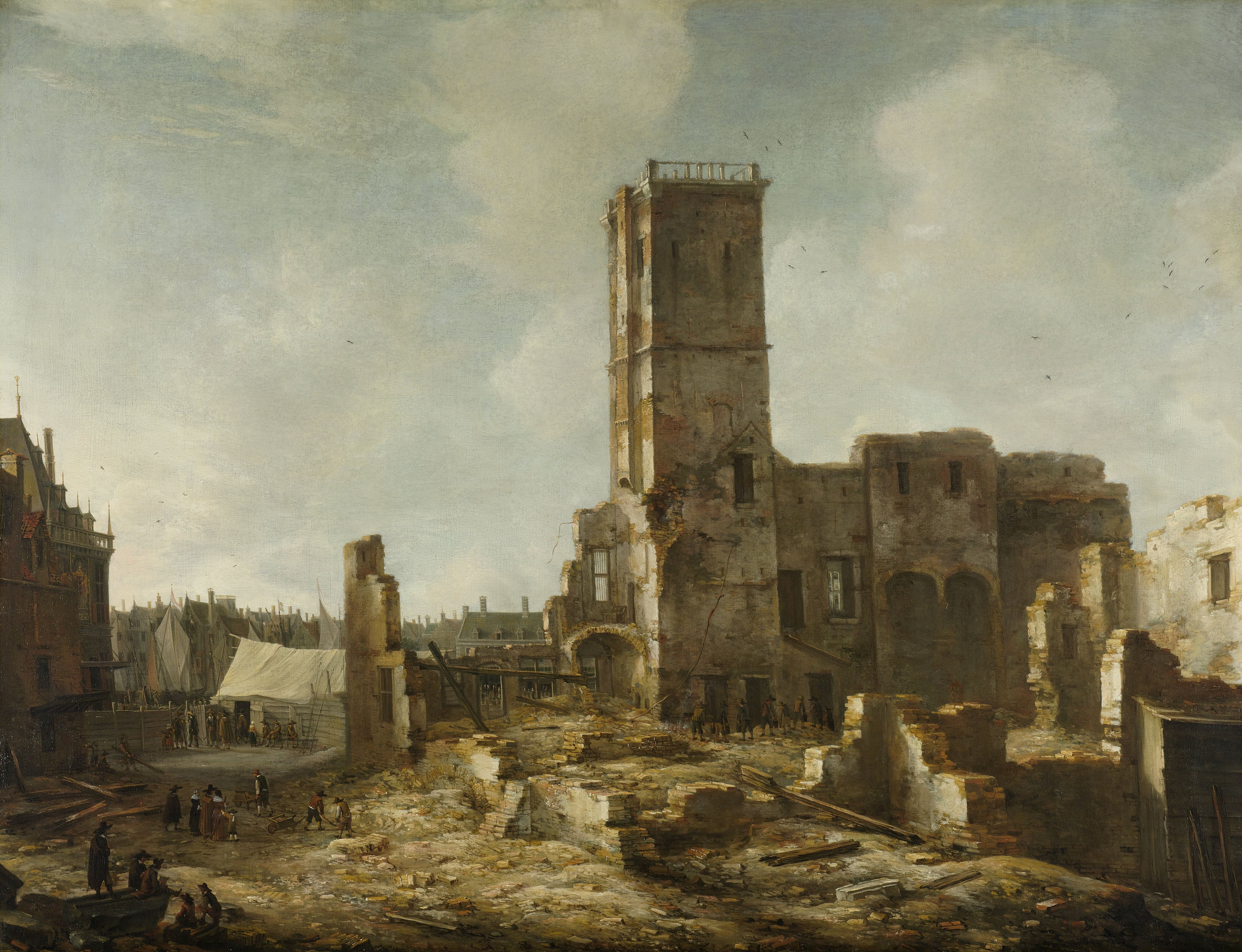
The Ruins of the Old Town Hall of Amsterdam after the Fire of 7 July 1652

Jan Abrahamsz, painter, was the son of Abraham Danielsz., a table clothmaker from Emden. He married on 30 August 1642, living at Elandstraat in the Jordaan. From this marriage twelve children were born. In 1651 he bought a new house at Rozengracht (174) opposite a labyrinth. In 1652 he watched the fire of the old townhall and produced one of his best works. In 1658 Rembrandt, Hendrickje Stoffels and Titus van Rijn became neighbors. In 1662, together with his eldest son, he traveled to Friesland, Groningen and many other places in Holland. In 1664 his wife died after a delivery and three children likely because of the plague.

In May 1665 he remarried in the church at Sloterdijk. On 1 July 1666 Van Beerstraten was buried in Westerkerk; his widow died three weeks later after a delivery. Four children were taken to the orphanage; the youngest sons survived, one was a school teacher and the other a carpenter.

Van Beerstraten was a pupil of Pieter Cornelisz van Soest; he owned a painting by Wouwerman, Pieter de Hoogh and Jan van der Heyden, and kept a large collection of books in his attic according to his inventory. There is some confusion about the identity of four landscape painters named Beerstraaten; Johannis, this Jan Abrahamsz, Abraham, Johannes and Anthonie. Currently, the RKD records Jan and Johannis as the same person, and Abraham Beerstraaten, who specialized in winterscapes, is considered to be his oldest son. Abraham Storck who cooperated with his son, inherited his unfinished paintings.

== Selected works ==
- Winter View of Leyden, 1660 – Hermitage Museum
- Skating at Slooten, near Amsterdam – Metropolitan Museum of Art
- Winter Landscape, 1655 – J. Paul Getty Museum
- Imaginary view of a port, with the façade of Santa Maria Maggiore in Rome, also known as The Old Port of Genes – Louvre
- Port – National Museum of Serbia, Belgrade
- Imaginary view of a port with the chevet of Lyon Cathedral – Louvre
- View of the Yacht of the Princes of Orange and Other Ships – Museum of Fine Arts, Boston
- The Castle of Muiden in Winter – National Gallery, London
- 5 works now at the Rijksmuseum, Amsterdam
- J.A. Beerstraten (1622-1666) - Schilderij, gezicht op de Martinikerk te Sneek
- Sailing man-of-war (watercolour on paper) – Courtauld Gallery
- A Dutch Flagship and a Fluyt Running into a Mediterranean Harbour – National Maritime Museum
- The Battle of Scheveningen – National Maritime Museum

=== Gallery ===
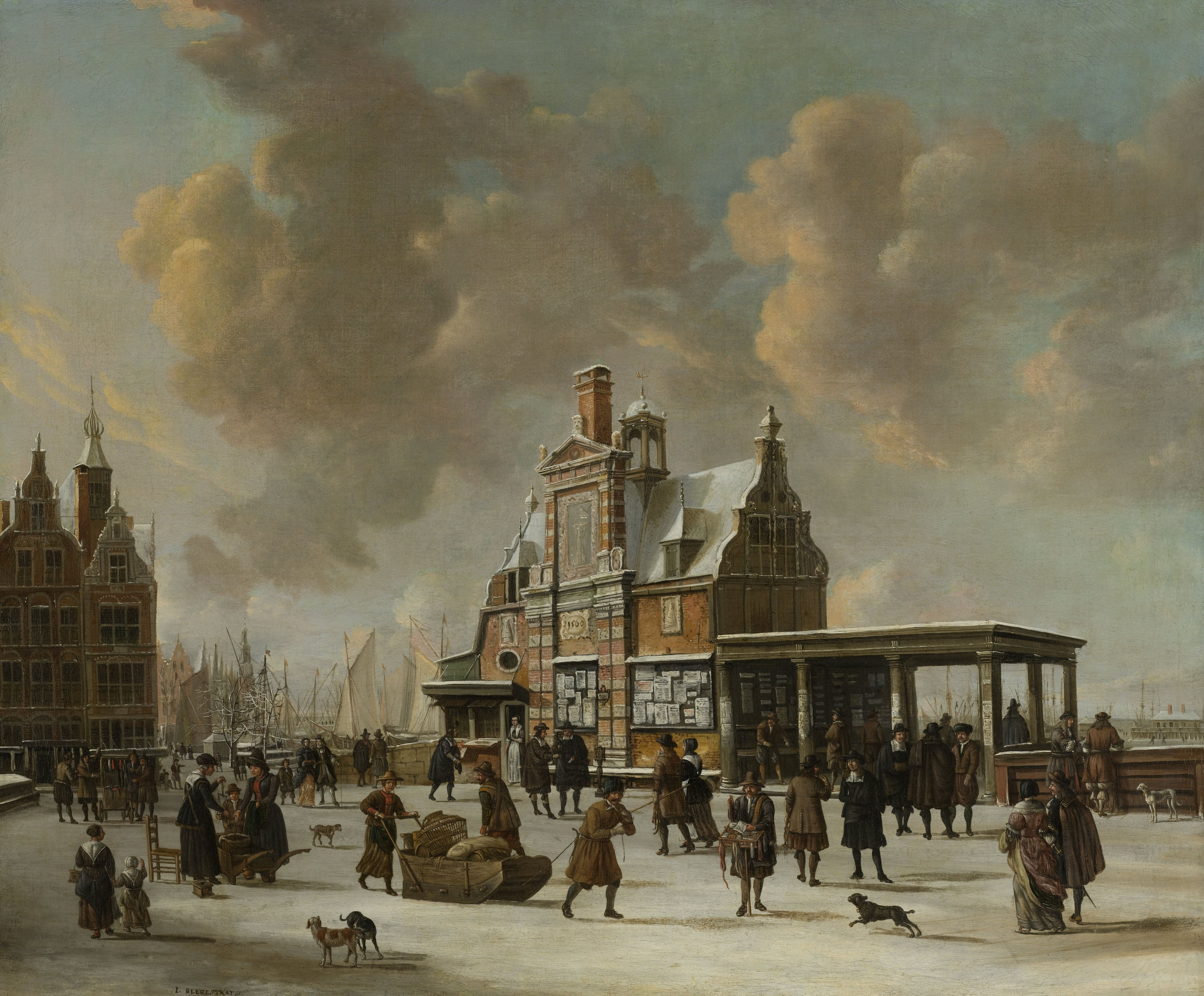
The Paalhuis and the Nieuwe Brug (Rijksmuseum)

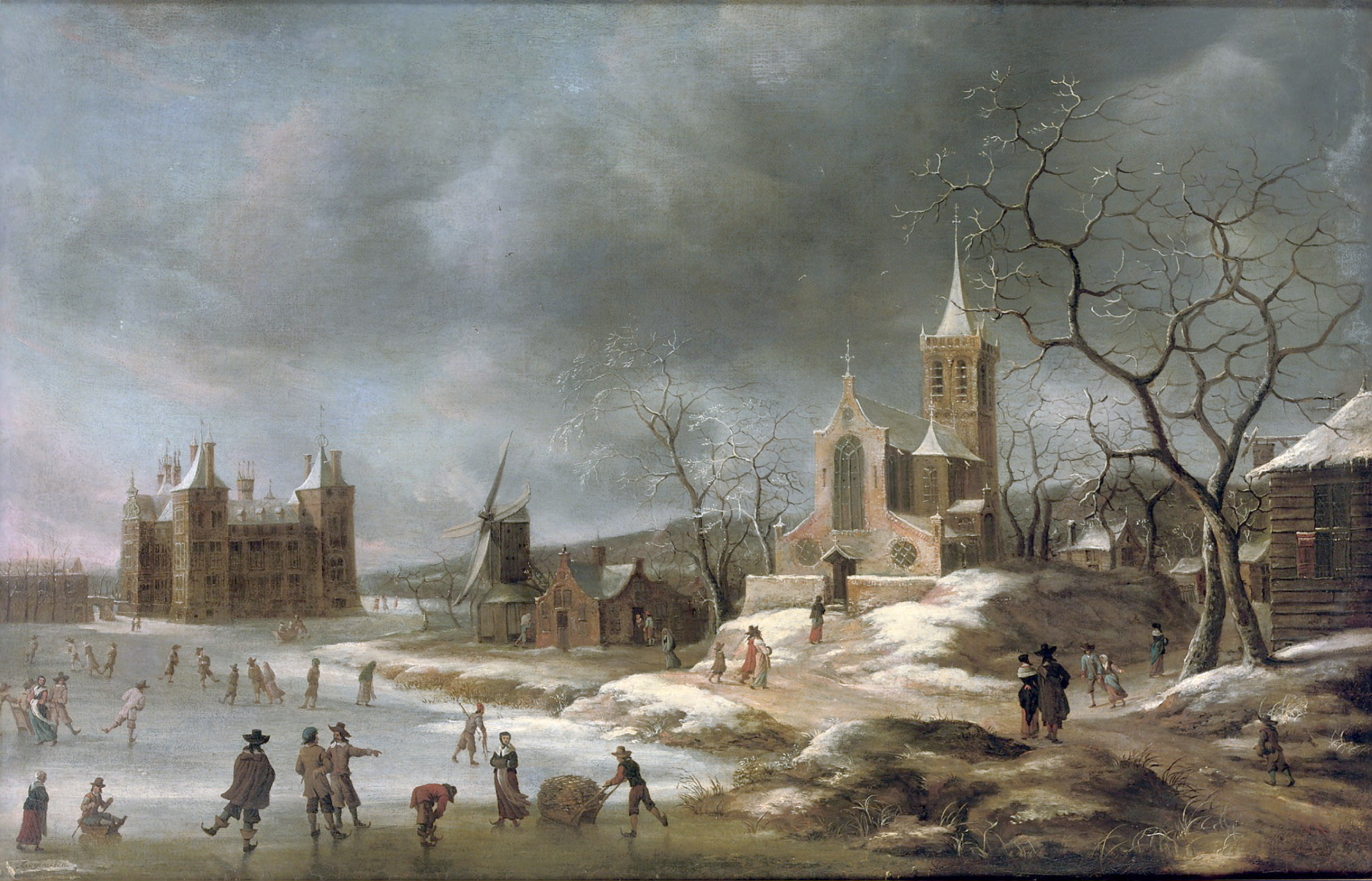
A winter landscape with activities on the ice near Castle Buren

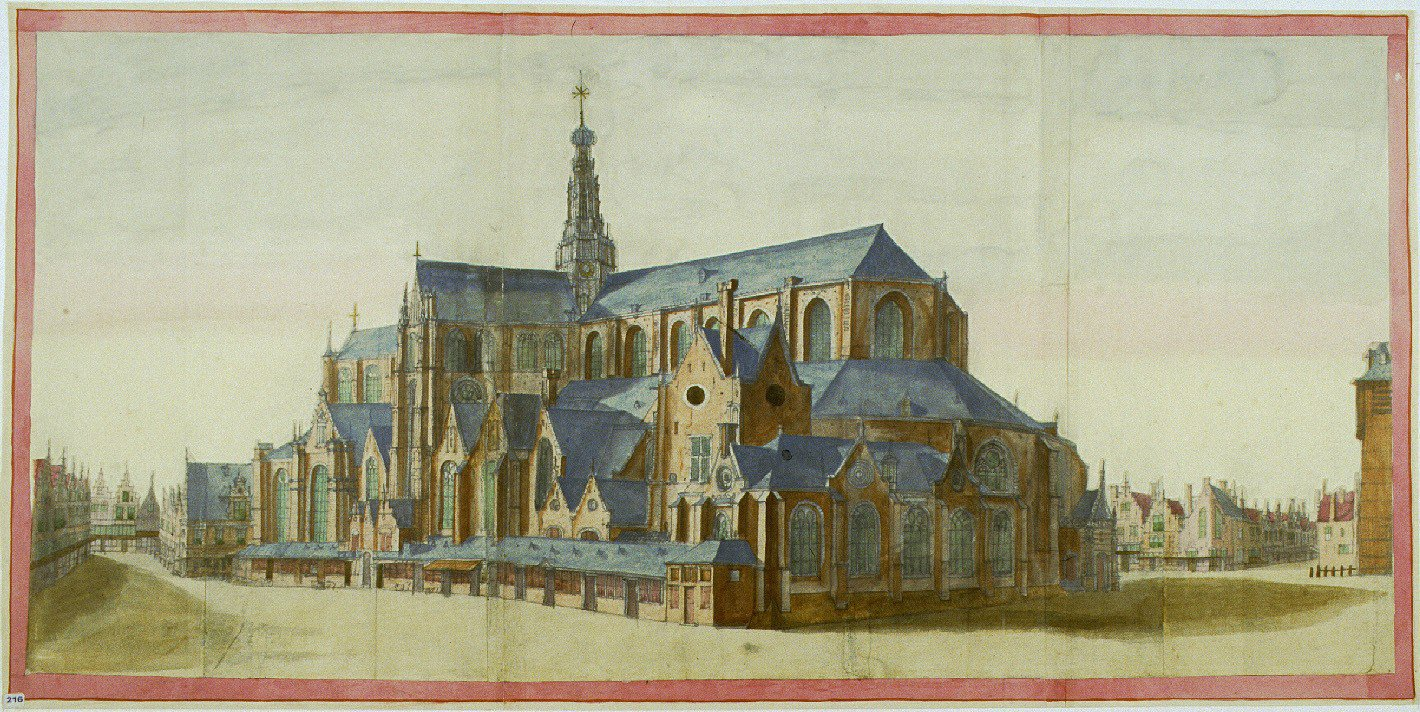
Bavokerk na uitbreiding door Salomon de Bray 1659

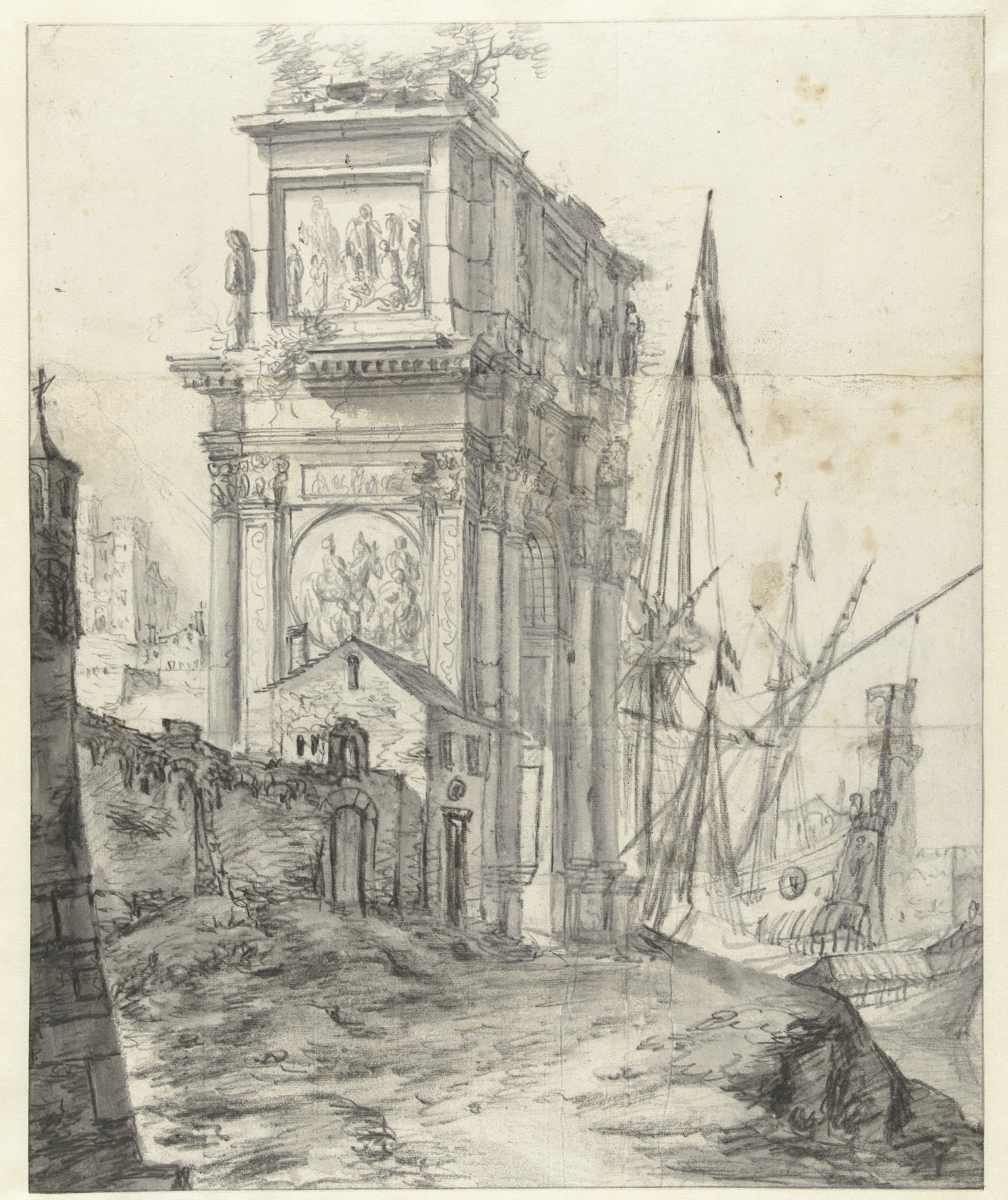
Capriccio met antieke triomfboog
