= Müllrose =

- Town
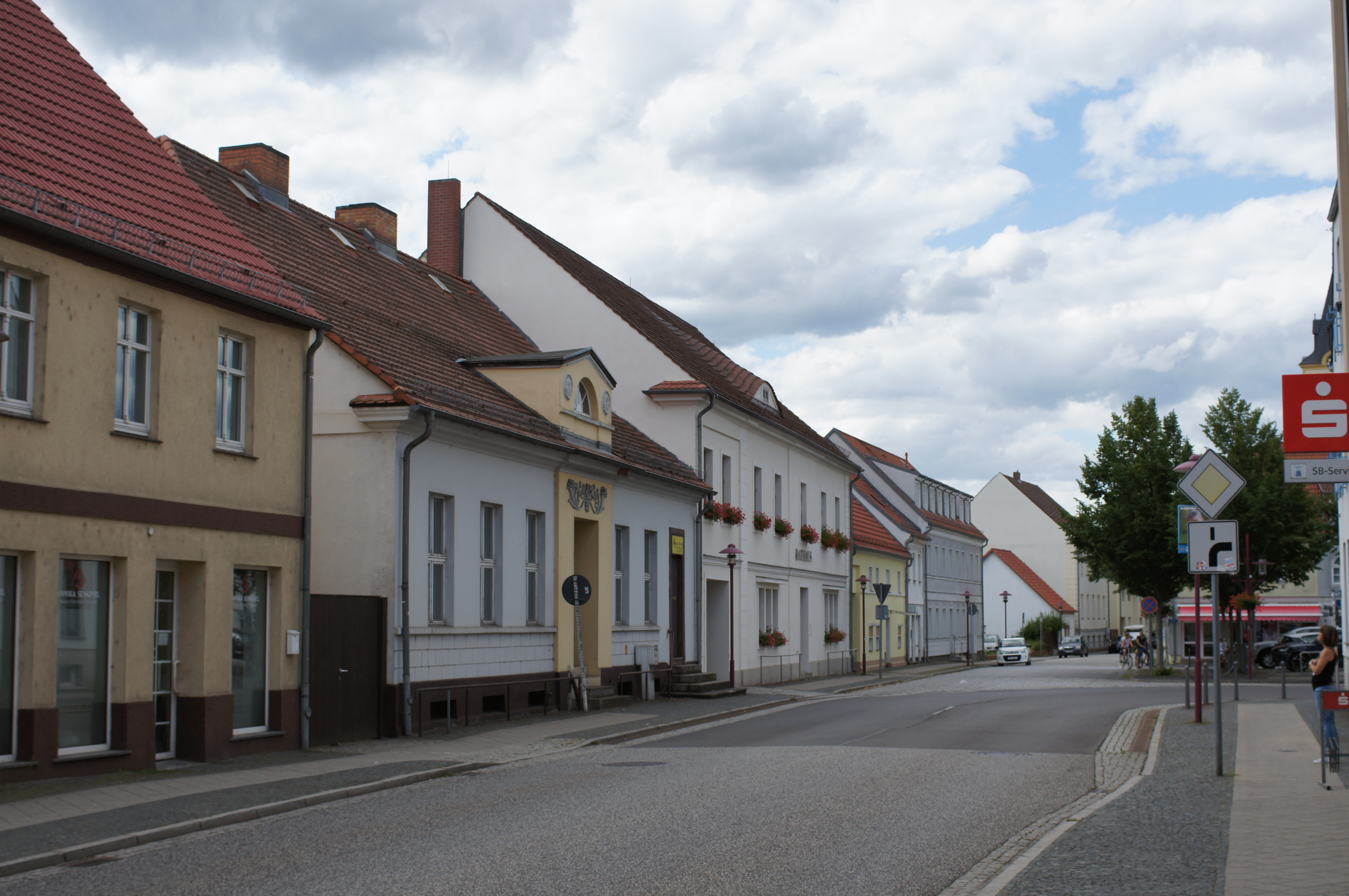

- Coat of arms

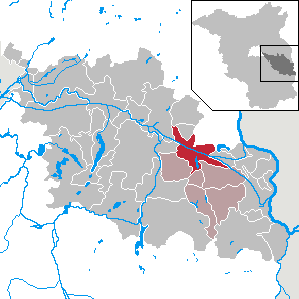
- Location of Müllrose within Oder-Spree district
- Interactive map of Müllrose
- Location within Germany Location within Brandenburg
- Coordinates: 52°15′N 14°25′E
- Country: Germany
- State: Brandenburg
- District: Oder-Spree
- Municipal assoc.: Schlaubetal

Government
  - Mayor (2024–29): Thomas Kühl

Area
  - Total: 69.24 km^{2} (26.73 sq mi)
- Elevation: 42 m (138 ft)

Population (2025-12-31)
  - Total: 4,646
  - Density: 67.10/km^{2} (173.8/sq mi)
- Time zone: UTC+01:00 (CET)
  - Summer (DST): UTC+02:00 (CEST)
- Postal codes: 15299
- Dialling codes: 033606
- Vehicle registration: LOS
- Website: www.muellrose.de

Müllrose (pronounced [mʏlˈʁoːzə]; Lower Sorbian: Miłoraz) is a town in the Oder-Spree district, in Brandenburg, in eastern Germany. It is situated on the Oder-Spree Canal, 15 km southwest of Frankfurt (Oder). A part of the town is located in the Schlaube Valley Nature Park, named after the Schlaube, a 20 kilometres long river.

== Overview ==
Müllrose is also situated at the northern bank of the Großer Müllroser See, a lake between Müllrose in the north and the municipality Mixdorf in the south. The lake covers an area of 1.32 km^{2} (0.51 sq mi). The watermill Müllrose was first mentioned in a document in 1275 and is still in use today.

== History ==
Müllrose, known in Polish as Miłoradz, is located in the Lubusz Land, a territory which formed part of Poland since its establishment in the mid-10th century. In the 13th century, it was annexed by the Margraviate of Brandenburg, and from 1373 to 1415 it was part of the Bohemian (Czech) Crown. From 1815 to 1947, Müllrose was part of the Prussian Province of Brandenburg.

After World War II, Müllrose was incorporated into the State of Brandenburg from 1947 to 1952 and the Bezirk Frankfurt of East Germany from 1952 to 1990. Since 1990 Müllrose is again part of Brandenburg.

== Demography ==
Development of Population since 1875 within the Current Boundaries (Blue Line: Population; Dotted Line: Comparison to Population Development of Brandenburg state; Grey Background: Time of Nazi rule; Red Background: Time of Communist rule)

Müllrose: Population development
within the current boundaries (2020)

Year	Pop.	±% p.a.
1875	2,710	—
1890	2,826	+0.28%
1910	2,876	+0.09%
1925	3,146	+0.60%
1933	3,249	+0.40%
1939	3,164	−0.44%
1946	3,515	+1.51%
1950	3,805	+2.00%
1964	3,271	−1.07%
1971	3,383	+0.48%
1981	3,171	−0.65%
1985	3,242	+0.56%
1989	3,139	−0.80%
1990	3,051	−2.80%
1991	3,044	−0.23%
1992	3,011	−1.08%
1993	3,053	+1.39%
1994	3,085	+1.05%
1995	3,140	+1.78%
1996	3,298	+5.03%
1997	3,565	+8.10%
1998	3,862	+8.33%

Year	Pop.	±% p.a.
1999	4,021	+4.12%
2000	4,180	+3.95%
2001	4,290	+2.63%
2002	4,337	+1.10%
2003	4,400	+1.45%
2004	4,428	+0.64%
2005	4,437	+0.20%
2006	4,503	+1.49%
2007	4,530	+0.60%
2008	4,504	−0.57%
2009	4,477	−0.60%
2010	4,444	−0.74%
2011	4,367	−1.73%
2012	4,432	+1.49%
2013	4,463	+0.70%
2014	4,514	+1.14%
2015	4,566	+1.15%
2016	4,571	+0.11%
2017	4,587	+0.35%
2018	4,630	+0.94%
2019	4,636	+0.13%
2020	4,632	−0.09%
