= Großer Müllroser See =

Lake in Brandenburg, Germany

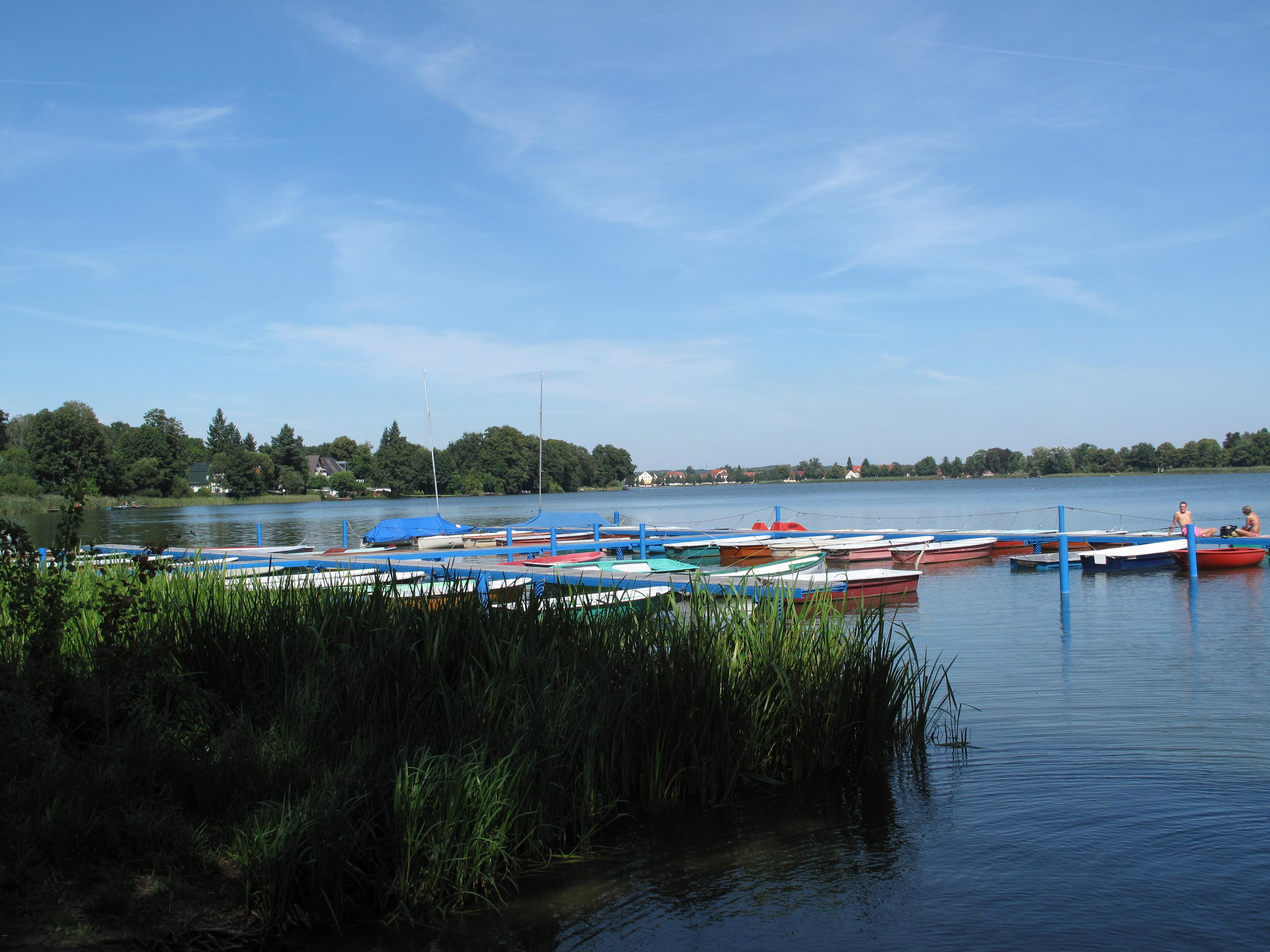

- Location within Brandenburg
- Location: Brandenburg, district Oder-Spree, Schlaube Valley Nature Park
- Coordinates: 52°14′N 14°25′E
- Primary inflows: Schlaube
- Primary outflows: Schlaube
- Basin countries: Germany
- Max. length: 2,900 m (9,500 ft)
- Max. width: 640 m (2,100 ft)
- Surface area: 1.32 km^{2} (0.51 sq mi)
- Max. depth: 8 m (26 ft)
- Water volume: 4.34×10^{6} m^{3} (153×10^{6} cu ft)
- Surface elevation: 41.6 m (136 ft)
- Settlements: Müllrose

The Großer Müllroser See is a lake in Brandenburg, Germany. It is located in the district Oder-Spree between the town Müllrose in the north and the municipality Mixdorf in the south. The lake covers an area of 1,32 km^{2}. At an elevation of 41,6 m, its depth is maximal 8 m.

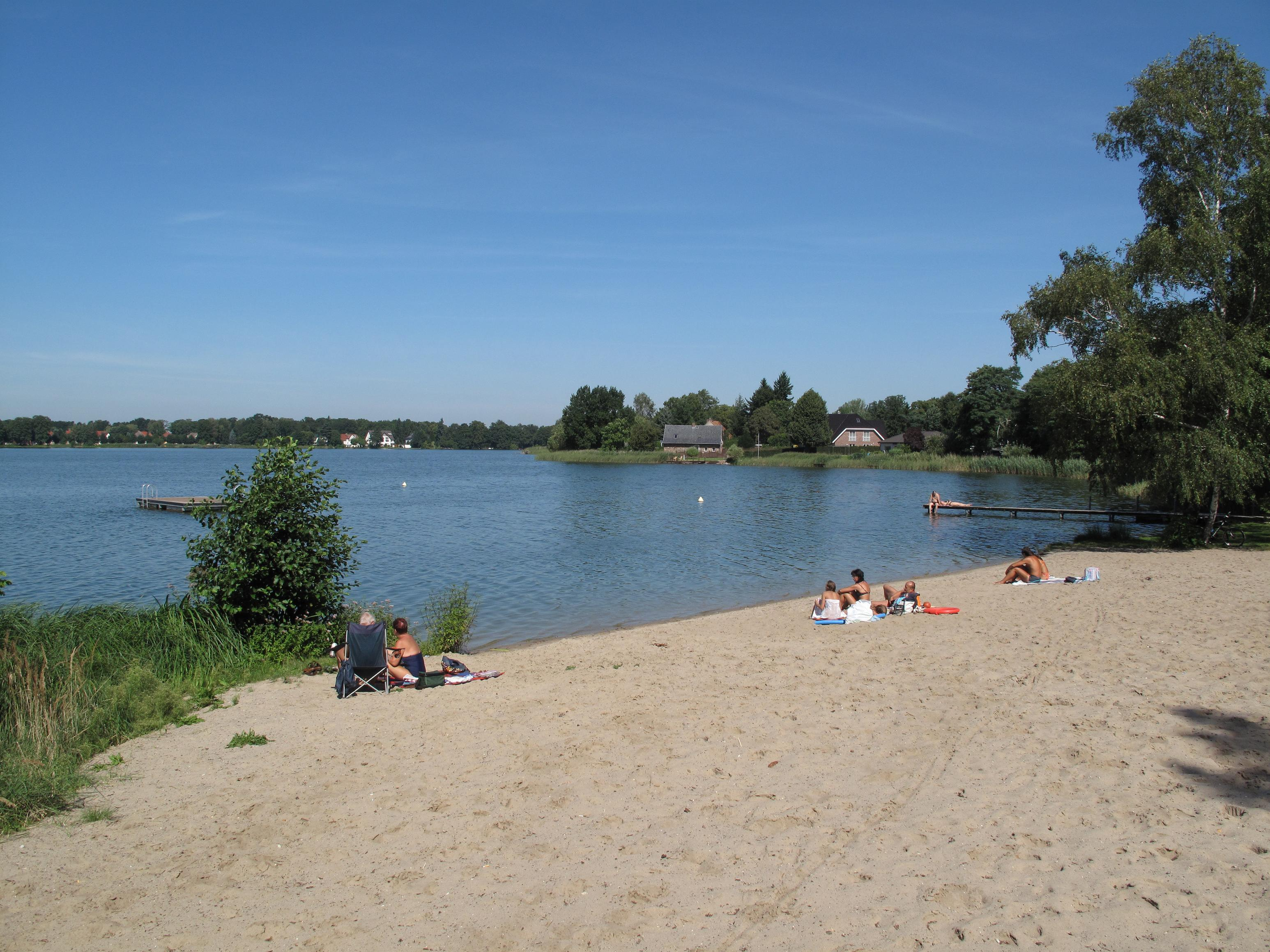
Beach at the eastern shore

The lake is the largest water in the Schlaube Valley Nature Park and flown through by the river Schlaube, which runs over a distance of 20 kilometers through the Schlaube-Valley (German: Schlaubetal), a tunnel valley of the last glacial period. An approximately 9 kilometres long walking path leads around the lake. At the eastern and western shore there are public lidos/beaches, one of them with a diving tower. On the sea are operating some passenger ships. The watermill Müllrose at the northern shore was first mentioned in a document in 1275 and is still in use today.
