= Reichenwalde =

- Municipality
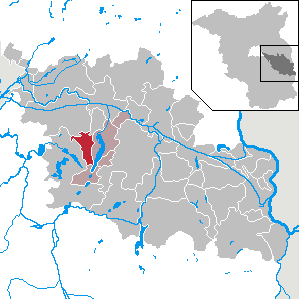
- Location of Reichenwalde within Oder-Spree district
- Interactive map of Reichenwalde
- Location within Germany Location within Brandenburg
- Coordinates: 52°15′53″N 13°59′54″E
- Country: Germany
- State: Brandenburg
- District: Oder-Spree
- Municipal assoc.: Scharmützelsee
- Subdivisions: 3 Ortsteile

Government
  - Mayor (2024–29): Joachim Kettner

Area
  - Total: 26.03 km^{2} (10.05 sq mi)
- Elevation: 52 m (171 ft)

Population (2025-12-31)
  - Total: 1,223
  - Density: 46.98/km^{2} (121.7/sq mi)
- Time zone: UTC+01:00 (CET)
  - Summer (DST): UTC+02:00 (CEST)
- Postal codes: 15526
- Dialling codes: 033631
- Vehicle registration: LOS
- Website: www.amt-scharmuetzelsee.de

Reichenwalde is a municipality in the Oder-Spree district, in Brandenburg, Germany.

== History ==
From 1815 to 1947, Reichenwalde was part of the Prussian Province of Brandenburg.

After World War II, Reichenwalde was incorporated into the State of Brandenburg from 1947 to 1952 and the Bezirk Frankfurt of East Germany from 1952 to 1990. Since 1990, Reichenwalde is again part of Brandenburg.

== Demography ==
Development of population since 1875 within the current boundaries (Blue line: Population; Dotted line: Comparison to population development of Brandenburg state; Grey background: Time of Nazi rule; Red background: Time of communist rule)

Reichenwalde: Population development
within the current boundaries (2013)

Year	Pop.	±% p.a.
1875	1,112	—
1890	1,099	−0.08%
1910	1,150	+0.23%
1925	1,160	+0.06%
1933	1,245	+0.89%
1939	1,193	−0.71%
1946	1,414	+2.46%
1950	1,453	+0.68%
1964	1,242	−1.11%
1971	1,187	−0.64%
1981	1,065	−1.08%
1985	1,001	−1.54%
1989	984	−0.43%
1990	990	+0.61%
1991	968	−2.22%
1992	955	−1.34%
1993	971	+1.68%
1994	978	+0.72%
1995	987	+0.92%
1996	997	+1.01%

Year	Pop.	±% p.a.
1997	1,002	+0.50%
1998	1,061	+5.89%
1999	1,086	+2.36%
2000	1,087	+0.09%
2001	1,108	+1.93%
2002	1,118	+0.90%
2003	1,121	+0.27%
2004	1,109	−1.07%
2005	1,097	−1.08%
2006	1,095	−0.18%
2007	1,106	+1.00%
2008	1,104	−0.18%
2009	1,119	+1.36%
2010	1,122	+0.27%
2011	1,122	+0.00%
2012	1,119	−0.27%
2013	1,113	−0.54%
2014	1,104	−0.81%
2015	1,115	+1.00%
2016	1,138	+2.06%

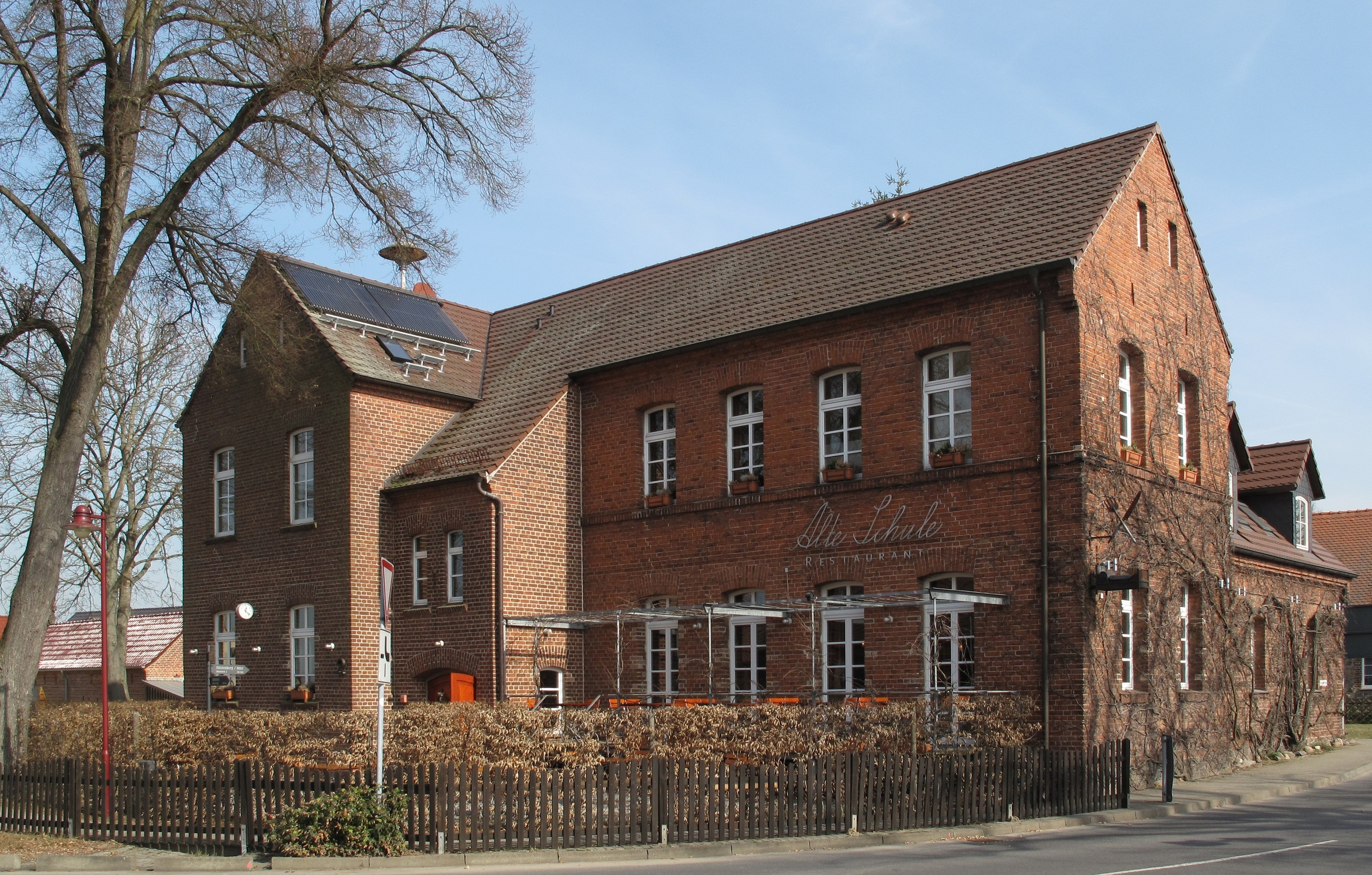
Old School Reichenwalde

== Notable people ==
- Wolfgang Kohlhaase (1931-2022) - acclaimed screenwriter, who lived in Reichenwalde
