= Dubrower Berge =

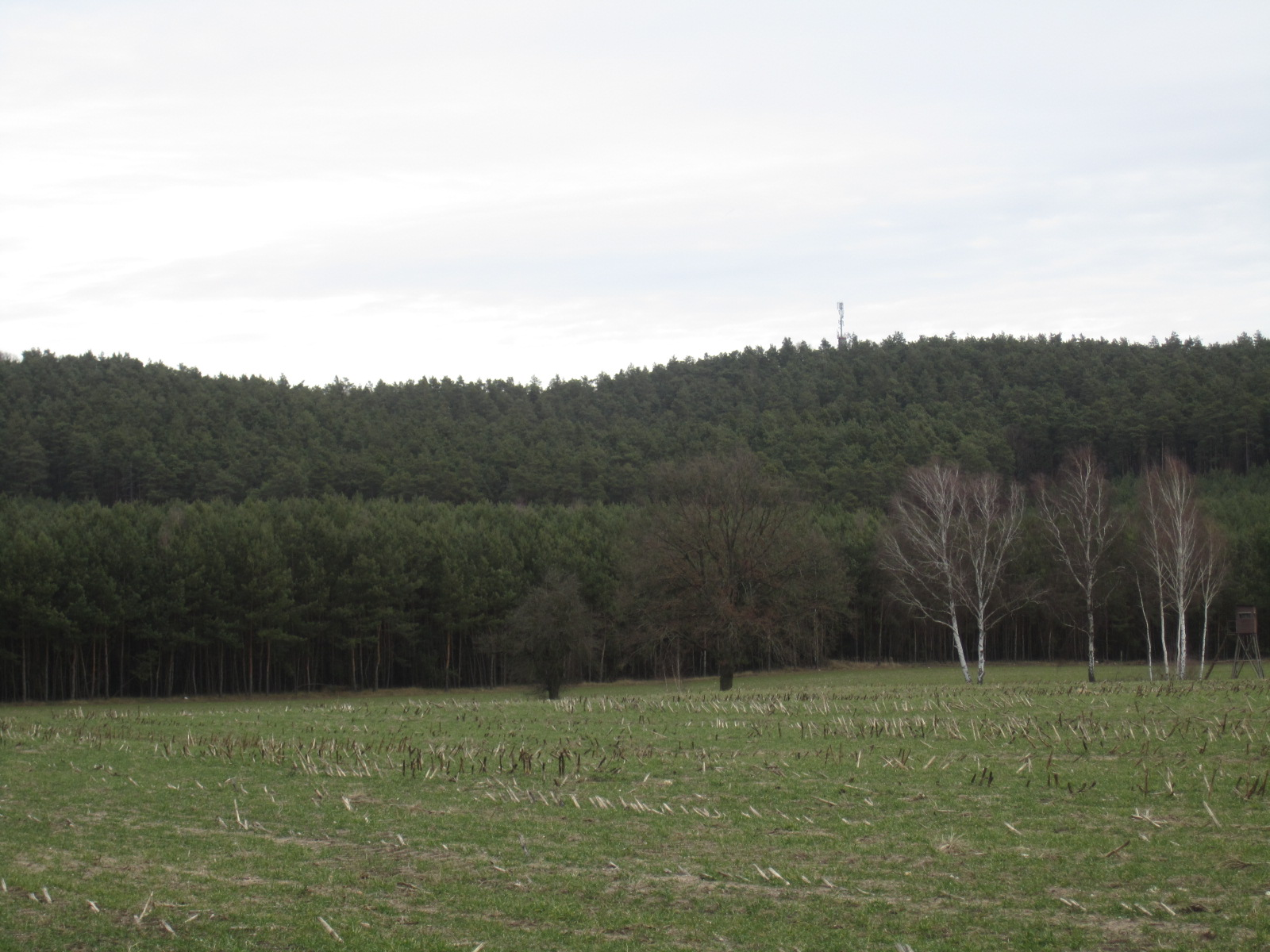
- The Dubrower Berge from the southwest

Highest point
- Peak: unnamed summit
- Elevation: 150 m above NHN

Geography
- Location within Brandenburg
- State(s): Langewahl Brandenburg, Germany
- Range coordinates: 52°18′48″N 14°06′38″E

Geology
- Orogeny: terminal moraines
- Rock age(s): Saale glaciation (ca. 140,000 years ago), reshaped during the Weichselian glaciation (ca. 20.000 Jahre), Tertiary rocks older than 5 MYA
- Rock type(s): predominantly glacial material (sand, gravel, drifts and erratics, till), interspersed with late Tertiary blocks, and periglacial deposits

The Dubrower Berge are an ice age range of hills (end moraines) in the German state of Brandenburg. They lie about six kilometres southeast of Fürstenwalde/Spree in the county of Oder-Spree in the triangle between the villages of Langewahl, Alt Golm in the municipality of Rietz-Neuendorf and Neu Golm in the municipality of Bad Saarow.

The name is derived from the Slavic dub which means oak.

The Dubrower Berge are easy to reach from Berlin or Frankfurt/Oder on the A12 autobahn, just 2 kilometres to the north.

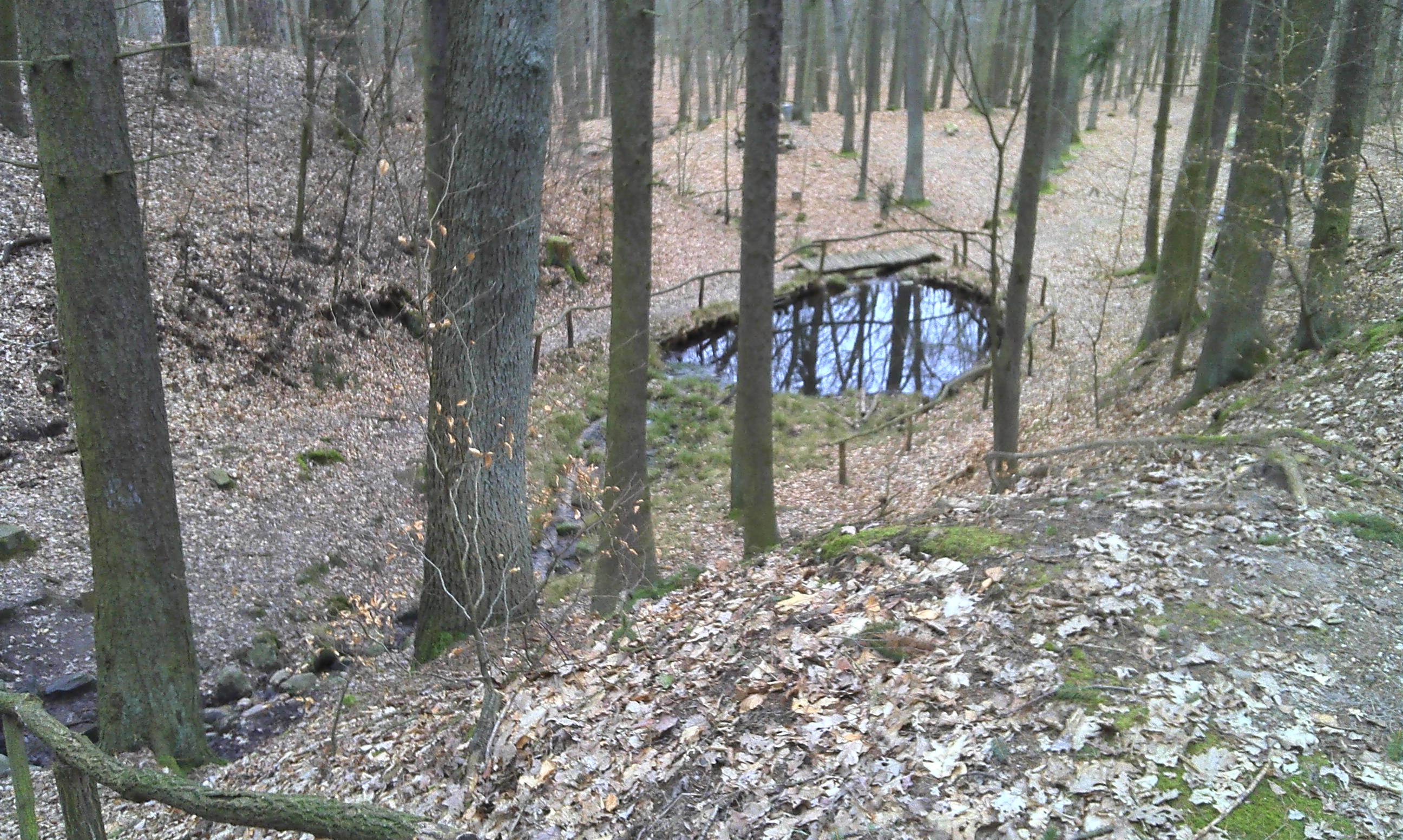
Osterquelle

A transmission tower has been erected at their highest point, 150 metres above sea level (NN).

The extensive stands of woods and variety of landscapes in the Dubrower Berge and surrounding area are used by hikers and cyclists. Near the village of Langewahl in the Dubrower Berge is the Osterquelle spring.

== See also ==
- Rauen Hills
