= Groß Lindow =

- Municipality
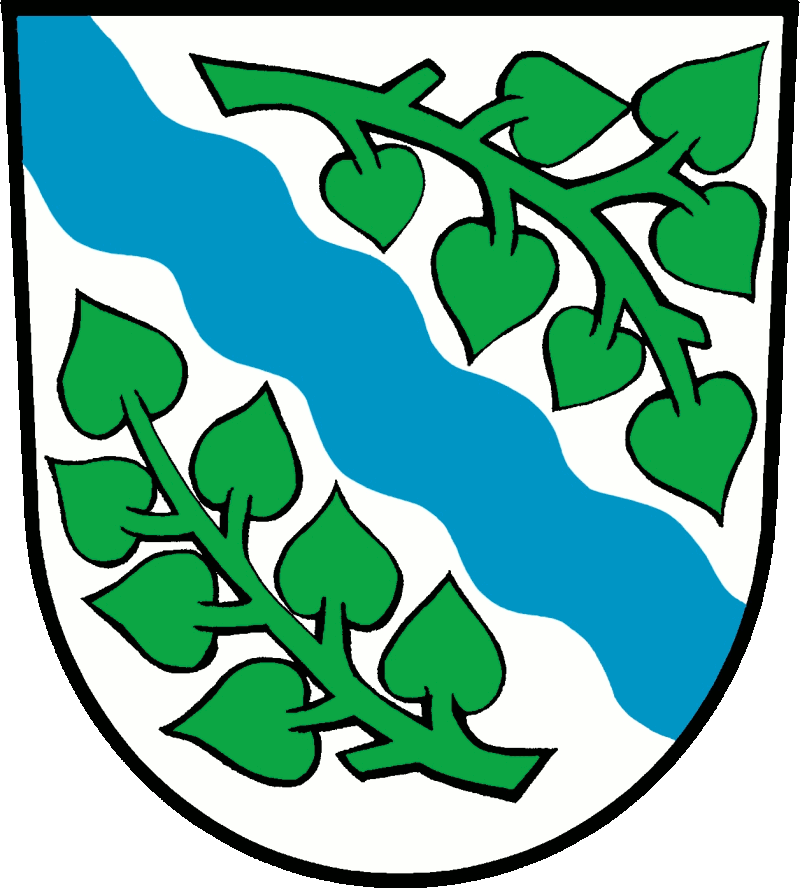
- Coat of arms

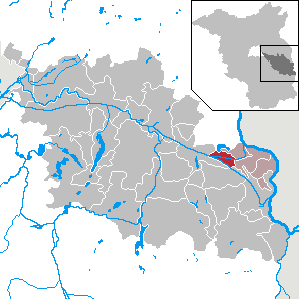
- Location of Groß Lindow within Oder-Spree district
- Interactive map of Groß Lindow
- Location within Germany Location within Brandenburg
- Coordinates: 52°14′N 14°32′E
- Country: Germany
- State: Brandenburg
- District: Oder-Spree
- Municipal assoc.: Brieskow-Finkenheerd
- Subdivisions: 4 districts

Government
  - Mayor (2024–29): Rene Weiner

Area
  - Total: 15.26 km^{2} (5.89 sq mi)
- Elevation: 32 m (105 ft)

Population (2025-12-31)
  - Total: 1,638
  - Density: 107.3/km^{2} (278.0/sq mi)
- Time zone: UTC+01:00 (CET)
  - Summer (DST): UTC+02:00 (CEST)
- Postal codes: 15295
- Dialling codes: 033609
- Vehicle registration: LOS

Groß Lindow is a municipality in the Oder-Spree district, in Brandenburg, Germany.

== History ==
From 1815 to 1947, Groß Lindow was part of the Prussian Province of Brandenburg.

After World War II, Groß Lindow was incorporated into the State of Brandenburg from 1947 to 1952 and the Bezirk Frankfurt of East Germany from 1952 to 1990. Since 1990, Groß Lindow is again part of Brandenburg.

== Demography ==
Development of population since 1875 within the current Boundaries (Blue Line: Population; Dotted Line: Comparison to Population development in Brandenburg state; Grey Background: Time of Nazi Germany; Red Background: Time of communist East Germany)

Groß Lindow: Population development
within the current boundaries (2013)

Year	Pop.	±% p.a.
1875	1,147	—
1890	1,092	−0.33%
1910	1,246	+0.66%
1925	1,425	+0.90%
1933	2,338	+6.38%
1939	2,183	−1.14%
1946	2,326	+0.91%
1950	2,332	+0.06%
1964	1,714	−2.18%
1971	1,628	−0.73%
1981	1,442	−1.21%
1985	1,350	−1.63%
1989	1,300	−0.94%
1990	1,278	−1.69%
1991	1,264	−1.10%
1992	1,271	+0.55%
1993	1,319	+3.78%
1994	1,398	+5.99%
1995	1,464	+4.72%
1996	1,493	+1.98%

Year	Pop.	±% p.a.
1997	1,560	+4.49%
1998	1,630	+4.49%
1999	1,731	+6.20%
2000	1,796	+3.76%
2001	1,825	+1.61%
2002	1,871	+2.52%
2003	1,883	+0.64%
2004	1,912	+1.54%
2005	1,878	−1.78%
2006	1,857	−1.12%
2007	1,844	−0.70%
2008	1,836	−0.43%
2009	1,840	+0.22%
2010	1,837	−0.16%
2011	1,779	−3.16%
2012	1,738	−2.30%
2013	1,720	−1.04%
2014	1,737	+0.99%
2015	1,734	−0.17%
2016	1,716	−1.04%
