= Neißemünde =

- Municipality
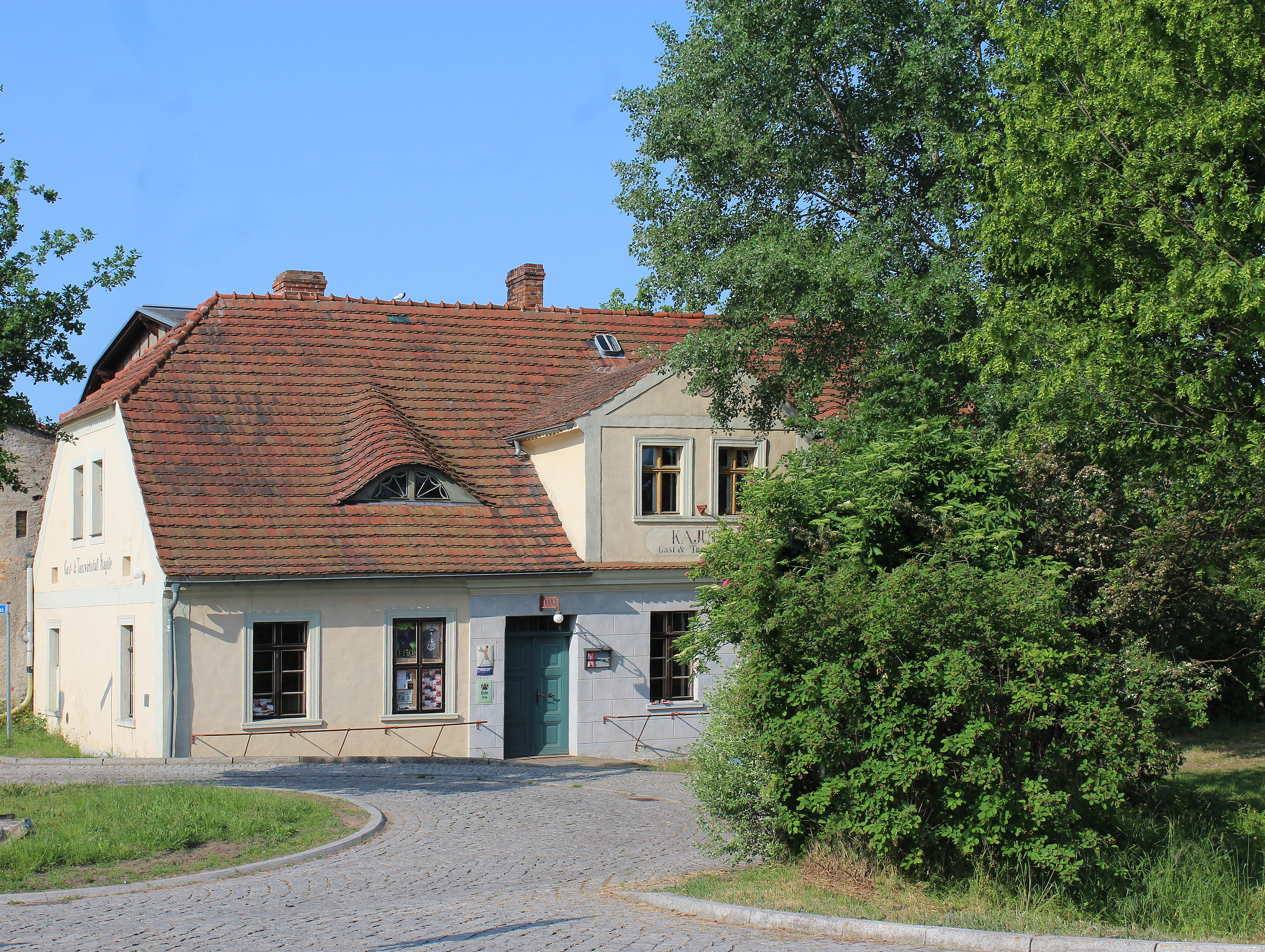

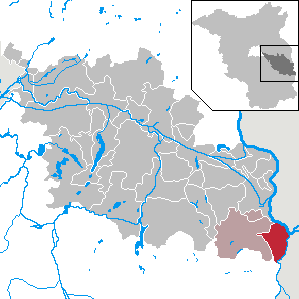
- Location of Neißemünde within Oder-Spree district
- Interactive map of Neißemünde
- Location within Germany Location within Brandenburg
- Coordinates: 52°04′00″N 14°43′00″E
- Country: Germany
- State: Brandenburg
- District: Oder-Spree
- Municipal assoc.: Neuzelle
- Subdivisions: 4 districts

Government
  - Mayor (2024–29): Manuela Mosig

Area
  - Total: 42.28 km^{2} (16.32 sq mi)
- Elevation: 35 m (115 ft)

Population (2025-12-31)
  - Total: 1,579
  - Density: 37.35/km^{2} (96.73/sq mi)
- Time zone: UTC+01:00 (CET)
  - Summer (DST): UTC+02:00 (CEST)
- Postal codes: 15898
- Dialling codes: 033652 and 033657
- Vehicle registration: LOS

Neißemünde (German pronunciation: [naɪsəˈmʏndə], lit. 'Mouth of the Neisse') is a municipality in the Oder-Spree district, in Brandenburg, in eastern Germany, on the border with Poland. It belongs to the Amt ("collective municipality") Neuzelle, which has its administrative seat in the neighbouring Neuzelle municipality.

== Geography ==
The municipal area is located in the historic Lower Lusatia region, close to the border with Żytowań in Poland. Near the village of Ratzdorf, the Lusatian Neisse discharges into the Oder River. Both rivers mark the German eastern border along the Oder–Neisse line.

=== Subdivision ===
Since 31 December 2001, the Neißemünde municipality consists of the following four villages:

- Breslack (Lower Sorbian: Brjazowy Ług)
- Coschen (Kóšyna)
- Ratzdorf (Radšow)
- Wellmitz (Wjelmice)

== History ==
The municipality of Neißemünde was formed on 31 December 2001 by merging the municipalities of Breslack, Coschen, Ratzdorf and Wellmitz.

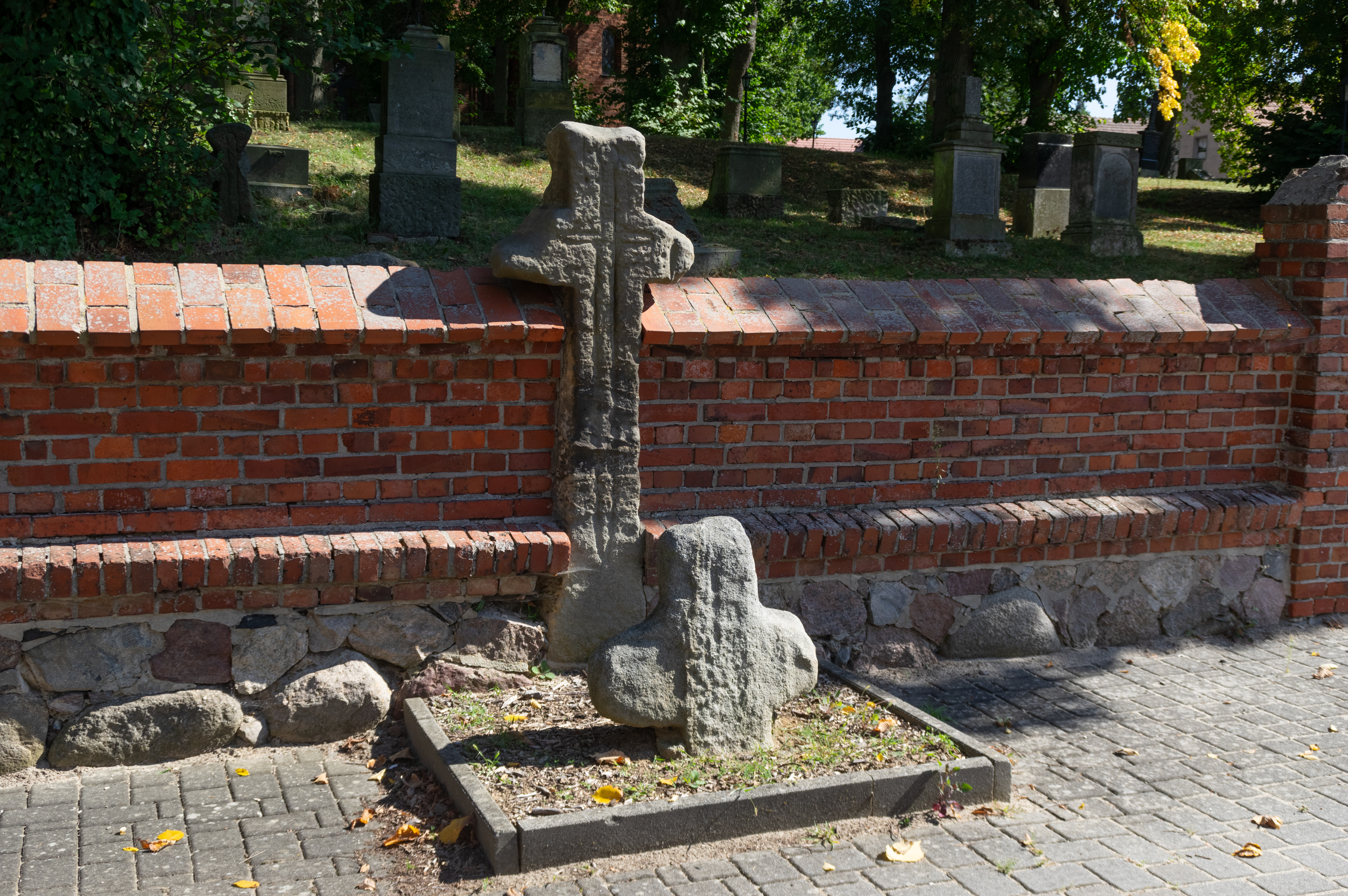
Medieval stone crosses in Wellmitz

Archaeological excavations of Globular Amphora culture artifacts denote a settlement of the area since the Neolithic. The region along the Oder and Neisse rivers was settled by Polabian Slavs (Sorbs) from about 600 onwards and in 965 became part of the Imperial March of Lusatia. Afterwards, it was at various times under Polish, Bohemian and Saxon rule. The village of Wellmitz was first mentioned in a 1300 deed issued by Margrave Theoderic IV. The estates then belonged to the Cistercian abbey of Neuzelle, confirmed by Emperor Charles IV in 1370.

In 1846 Wellmitz and Coschen were connected to the Lower Silesian-Mark Railway line from Berlin to Wrocław. The village of Ratzdorf was heavily affected by the 1997 Central European flood; reconstruction was funded, inter alia, through a substantial donation by US singer Michael Jackson.

From 1815 to 1947, the constituent localities of Neißemünde were part of the Province of Brandenburg of Prussia (from 1871 also part of the German Empire).

After World War II, Breslack, Coschen, Ratzdorf and Wellmitz were incorporated into the State of Brandenburg from 1947 to 1952 and the Bezirk Frankfurt of East Germany from 1952 to 1990. Since 1990 they are again part of Brandenburg, since 2001 united as the municipality of Neißemünde.

== Demography ==
Development of Population since 1875 within the Current Boundaries (Blue Line: Population; Dotted Line: Comparison to Population Development of Brandenburg state; Grey Background: Time of Nazi rule; Red Background: Time of Communist rule)

Neißemünde: Population development
within the current boundaries (2013)

Year	Pop.	±% p.a.
1875	2,719	—
1890	2,691	−0.07%
1910	2,459	−0.45%
1925	2,515	+0.15%
1933	2,570	+0.27%
1939	2,474	−0.63%
1946	3,555	+5.32%
1950	3,644	+0.62%
1964	2,842	−1.76%
1971	2,569	−1.43%
1981	2,046	−2.25%
1985	2,007	−0.48%
1989	1,918	−1.13%
1990	1,874	−2.29%

Year	Pop.	±% p.a.
1991	1,842	−1.71%
1992	1,817	−1.36%
1993	1,811	−0.33%
1994	1,809	−0.11%
1995	1,843	+1.88%
1996	1,854	+0.60%
1997	1,909	+2.97%
1998	1,925	+0.84%
1999	1,896	−1.51%
2000	1,917	+1.11%
2001	1,903	−0.73%
2002	1,912	+0.47%
2003	1,890	−1.15%
2004	1,880	−0.53%

Year	Pop.	±% p.a.
2005	1,884	+0.21%
2006	1,868	−0.85%
2007	1,840	−1.50%
2008	1,807	−1.79%
2009	1,795	−0.66%
2010	1,761	−1.89%
2011	1,747	−0.80%
2012	1,728	−1.09%
2013	1,687	−2.37%
2014	1,666	−1.24%
2015	1,610	−3.36%
2016	1,590	−1.24%
