= Wiesenau =

- Municipality
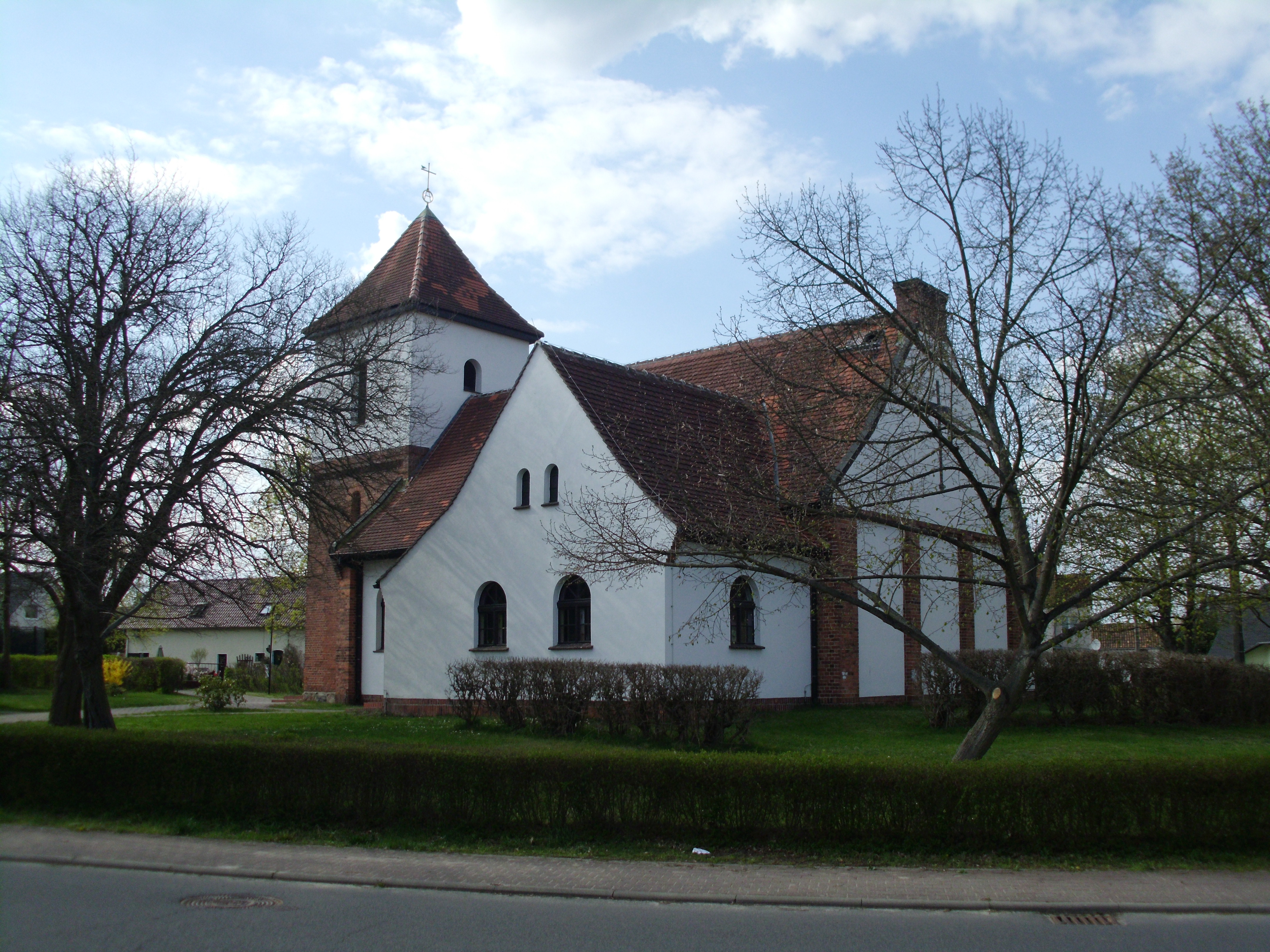
- Village church

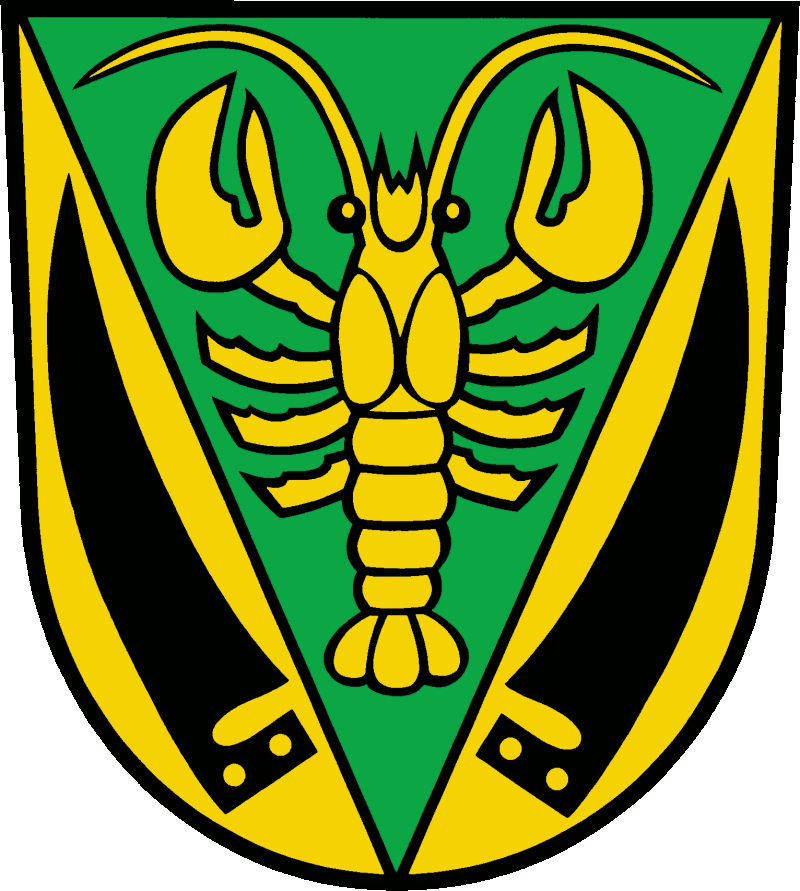
- Coat of arms

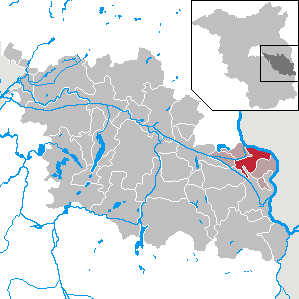
- Location of Wiesenau within Oder-Spree district
- Interactive map of Wiesenau
- Location within Germany Location within Brandenburg
- Coordinates: 52°14′N 14°36′E
- Country: Germany
- State: Brandenburg
- District: Oder-Spree
- Municipal assoc.: Brieskow-Finkenheerd

Government
  - Mayor (2024–29): Karsten Wolff

Area
  - Total: 29.59 km^{2} (11.42 sq mi)
- Elevation: 39 m (128 ft)

Population (2025-12-31)
  - Total: 1,204
  - Density: 40.69/km^{2} (105.4/sq mi)
- Time zone: UTC+01:00 (CET)
  - Summer (DST): UTC+02:00 (CEST)
- Postal codes: 15295
- Dialling codes: 033609
- Vehicle registration: LOS
- Website: http://www.brieskow-finkenheerd.de/

Wiesenau (Lower Sorbian: Łuka, pronounced [ˈwuka]) is a municipality in the Oder-Spree district, in Brandenburg, Germany.

== History ==
From 1815 to 1947, Wiesenau was part of the Prussian Province of Brandenburg.

After World War II, Wiesenau was incorporated into the State of Brandenburg from 1947 to 1952 and the Bezirk Frankfurt of East Germany from 1952 to 1990. Since 1990 Wiesenau has been part of Brandenburg.

== Demography ==
Development of population since 1875 within the current Boundaries (Blue Line: Population; Dotted Line: Comparison to Population development in Brandenburg state; Grey Background: Time of Nazi Germany; Red Background: Time of communist East Germany)

Wiesenau: Population development
within the current boundaries (2013)

Year	Pop.	±% p.a.
1875	1,235	—
1890	1,258	+0.12%
1910	1,316	+0.23%
1925	1,385	+0.34%
1933	1,611	+1.91%
1939	1,602	−0.09%
1946	1,358	−2.33%
1950	1,514	+2.76%
1964	1,517	+0.01%
1971	1,485	−0.30%
1981	1,296	−1.35%
1985	1,281	−0.29%
1989	1,275	−0.12%
1990	1,247	−2.20%
1991	1,244	−0.24%
1992	1,237	−0.56%
1993	1,236	−0.08%
1994	1,253	+1.38%
1995	1,267	+1.12%
1996	1,283	+1.26%

Year	Pop.	±% p.a.
1997	1,316	+2.57%
1998	1,384	+5.17%
1999	1,406	+1.59%
2000	1,434	+1.99%
2001	1,460	+1.81%
2002	1,453	−0.48%
2003	1,468	+1.03%
2004	1,438	−2.04%
2005	1,429	−0.63%
2006	1,411	−1.26%
2007	1,416	+0.35%
2008	1,401	−1.06%
2009	1,354	−3.35%
2010	1,334	−1.48%
2011	1,291	−3.22%
2012	1,271	−1.55%
2013	1,250	−1.65%
2014	1,266	+1.28%
2015	1,270	+0.32%
2016	1,259	−0.87%
