= Wendisch Rietz =

- Municipality
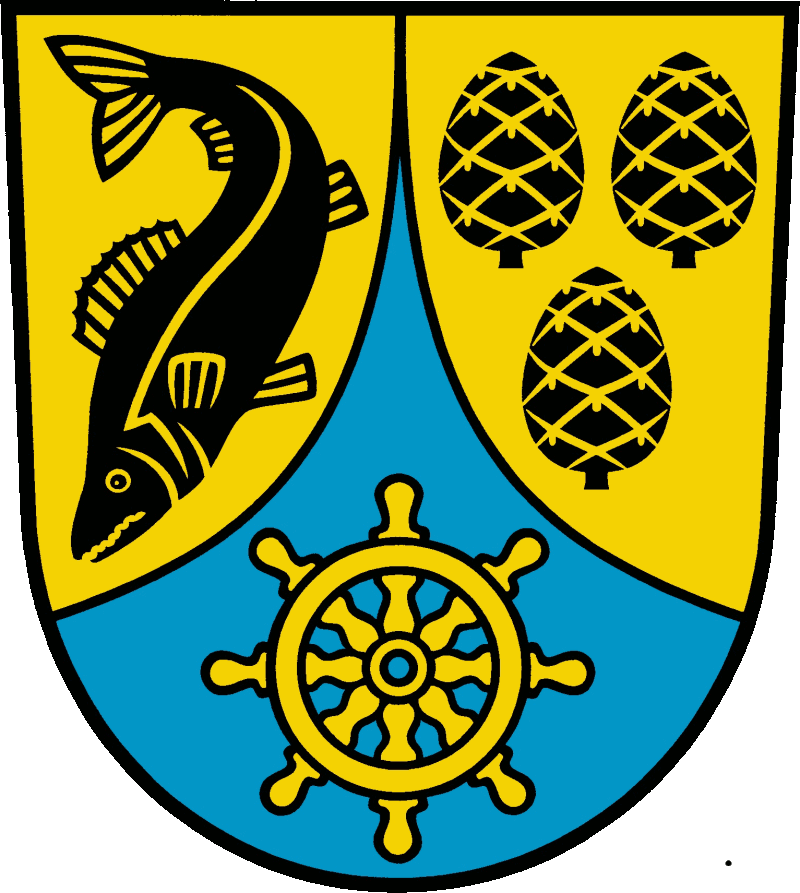
- Coat of arms

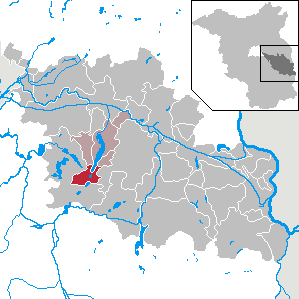
- Location of Wendisch Rietz within Oder-Spree district
- Interactive map of Wendisch Rietz
- Location within Germany Location within Brandenburg
- Coordinates: 52°12′00″N 14°01′00″E
- Country: Germany
- State: Brandenburg
- District: Oder-Spree
- Municipal assoc.: Scharmützelsee

Government
  - Mayor (2024–29): Andreas Diebert

Area
  - Total: 25.07 km^{2} (9.68 sq mi)
- Elevation: 51 m (167 ft)

Population (2025-12-31)
  - Total: 1,658
  - Density: 66.13/km^{2} (171.3/sq mi)
- Time zone: UTC+01:00 (CET)
  - Summer (DST): UTC+02:00 (CEST)
- Postal codes: 15864
- Dialling codes: 033679
- Vehicle registration: LOS
- Website: www.amt-scharmuetzelsee.de

Wendisch Rietz is a municipality in the Oder-Spree district, in Brandenburg, Germany.

== History ==
From 1815 to 1947, Wendisch Rietz was part of the Prussian Province of Brandenburg, from 1947 to 1952 of the State of Brandenburg, from 1952 to 1990 of the Bezirk Frankfurt of East Germany and since 1990 again of Brandenburg.

== Demography ==
Development of population since 1875 within the current Boundaries (Blue Line: Population; Dotted Line: Comparison to Population development in Brandenburg state; Grey Background: Time of Nazi Germany; Red Background: Time of communist East Germany)

Wendisch Rietz: Population development
within the current boundaries (2013)

Year	Pop.	±% p.a.
1875	248	—
1890	252	+0.11%
1910	249	−0.06%
1925	398	+3.18%
1933	398	+0.00%
1939	415	+0.70%
1946	1,012	+13.58%
1950	949	−1.59%
1964	861	−0.69%
1971	784	−1.33%
1981	1,031	+2.78%
1985	1,063	+0.77%
1989	1,050	−0.31%
1990	1,055	+0.48%
1991	1,092	+3.51%
1992	1,093	+0.09%
1993	1,080	−1.19%
1994	1,119	+3.61%
1995	1,066	−4.74%
1996	1,065	−0.09%

Year	Pop.	±% p.a.
1997	1,075	+0.94%
1998	1,100	+2.33%
1999	1,231	+11.91%
2000	1,306	+6.09%
2001	1,337	+2.37%
2002	1,345	+0.60%
2003	1,407	+4.61%
2004	1,410	+0.21%
2005	1,424	+0.99%
2006	1,428	+0.28%
2007	1,421	−0.49%
2008	1,421	+0.00%
2009	1,421	+0.00%
2010	1,406	−1.06%
2011	1,442	+2.56%
2012	1,467	+1.73%
2013	1,489	+1.50%
2014	1,506	+1.14%
2015	1,531	+1.66%
2016	1,531	+0.00%
