= Demnitz =

River in Germany

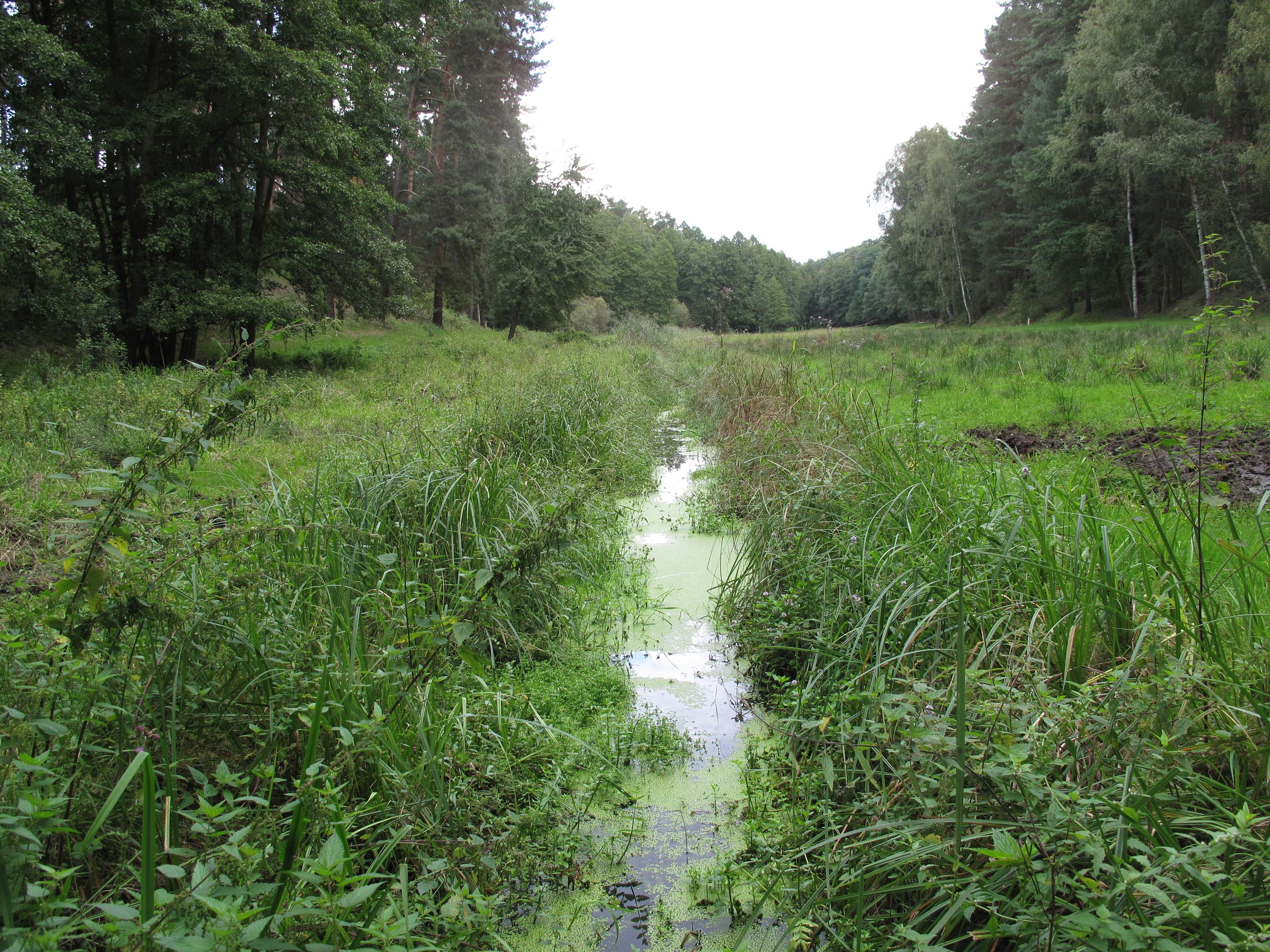

Location
- Country: Germany
- State: Brandenburg

Physical characteristics
- Mouth
  - location: Oelsener See
  - coordinates: 52.1479°N 14.4096°E

Basin features
- Progression: Oelse→ Spree→ Havel→ Elbe→ North Sea

Demnitz (German pronunciation: [ˈdeːmnɪts]) is a small river of Brandenburg, Germany. It flows into the Oelsener See, which is drained by the Oelse, near Grunow-Dammendorf.

== See also ==
- List of rivers of Brandenburg
