= Oelse =

River in Germany

Coordinates: 52.1771°N 14.2626°E

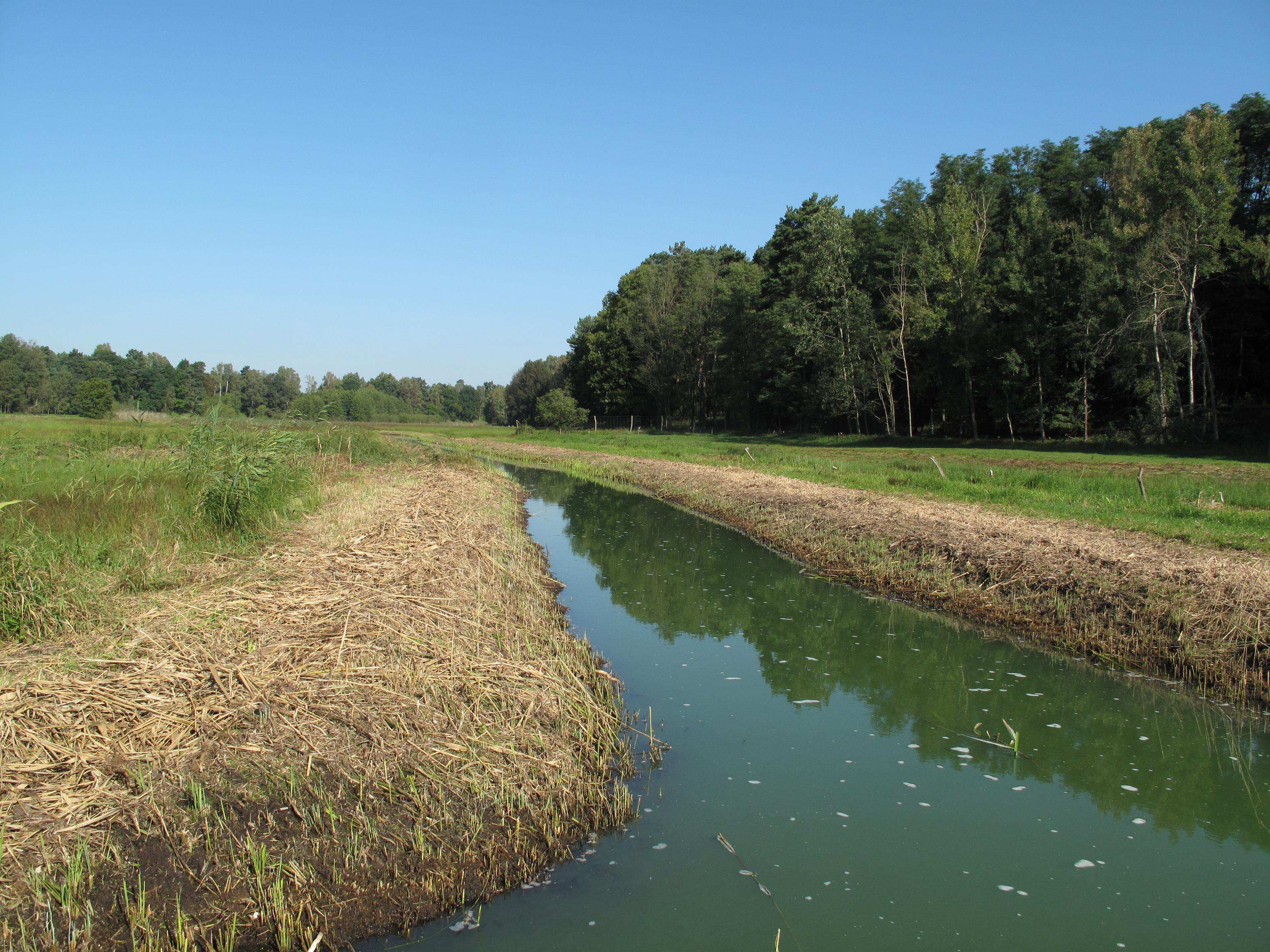

Location
- Country: Germany
- State: Brandenburg
- District: Oder-Spree

Physical characteristics
- Source
  - location: Möschensee
  - elevation: 68.3 m (224 ft)
- Mouth
  - location: Spree near Beeskow
  - elevation: 40.4 m (133 ft)

Basin features
- Progression: Spree→ Havel→ Elbe→ North Sea

The Oelse is a river in the district Oder-Spree, Brandenburg, Germany. It is situated in the Schlaube Valley Nature Park and runs from the Möschensee (lake) in the east from Groß Muckrow (part of Friedland) to the river Spree near Beeskow. Its name derives from the sorbian ol'ša (English: alder tree).

== See also ==
- List of rivers of Brandenburg
