= Vogelsang, Brandenburg =

Vogelsang
- Municipality
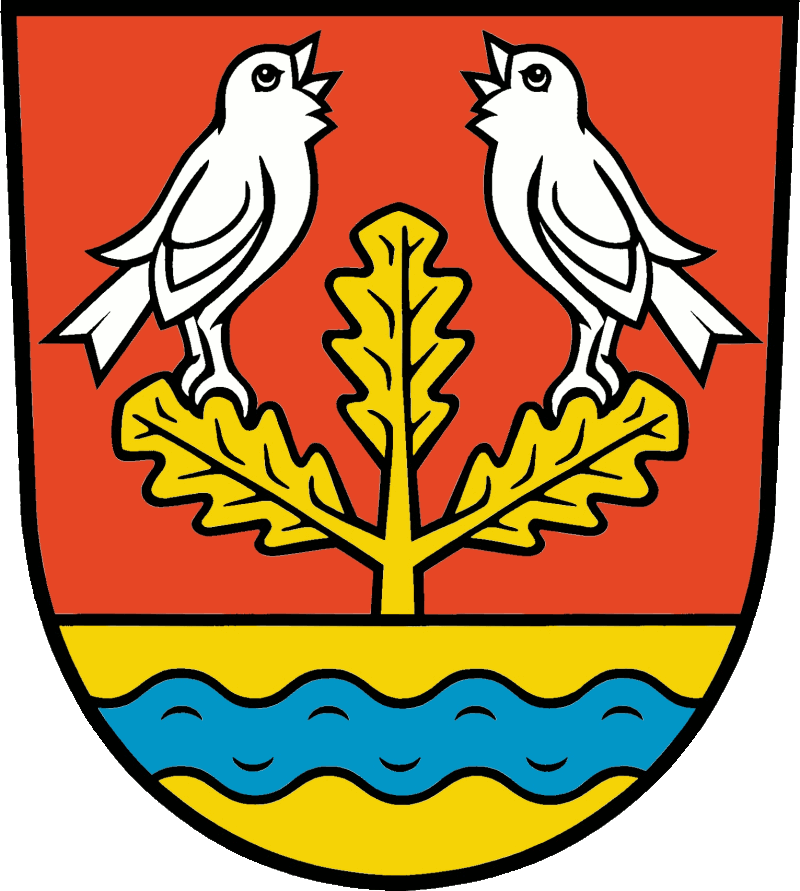
- Coat of arms

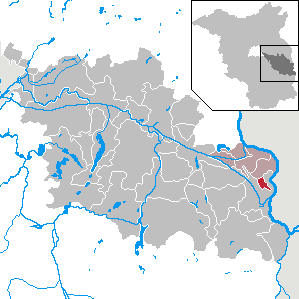
- Location of Vogelsang within Oder-Spree district
- Interactive map of Vogelsang
- Location within Germany Location within Brandenburg
- Coordinates: 52°10′59″N 14°40′00″E
- Country: Germany
- State: Brandenburg
- District: Oder-Spree
- Municipal assoc.: Brieskow-Finkenheerd

Government
  - Mayor (2024–29): Frank-Michael Schulze

Area
  - Total: 5.79 km^{2} (2.24 sq mi)
- Elevation: 27 m (89 ft)

Population (2025-12-31)
  - Total: 736
  - Density: 127/km^{2} (329/sq mi)
- Time zone: UTC+01:00 (CET)
  - Summer (DST): UTC+02:00 (CEST)
- Postal codes: 15890
- Dialling codes: 03364
- Vehicle registration: LOS

Vogelsang is a municipality in the Oder-Spree district, in Brandenburg, Germany. It is located near the border with Poland.

== History ==
From 1815 to 1947, Vogelsang was part of the Prussian Province of Brandenburg.

After World War II, Vogelsang was incorporated into the State of Brandenburg from 1947 to 1952 and the Bezirk Frankfurt of East Germany from 1952 to 1990. Since 1990, Vogelsang is again part of Brandenburg.

== Demography ==
Development of population since 1875 within the current Boundaries (Blue Line: Population; Dotted Line: Comparison to Population development in Brandenburg state; Grey Background: Time of Nazi Germany; Red Background: Time of communist East Germany)

Vogelsang: Population development
within the current boundaries (2013)

| Year | Pop. | ±% p.a. |
|---|---|---|
| 1875 | 653 | — |
| 1890 | 798 | +1.35% |
| 1910 | 963 | +0.94% |
| 1925 | 958 | −0.03% |
| 1933 | 930 | −0.37% |
| 1939 | 896 | −0.62% |
| 1946 | 532 | −7.18% |
| 1950 | 754 | +9.11% |
| 1964 | 772 | +0.17% |
| 1971 | 719 | −1.01% |
| 1981 | 647 | −1.05% |
| 1985 | 620 | −1.06% |
| 1989 | 593 | −1.11% |
| 1990 | 557 | −6.07% |
| 1991 | 549 | −1.44% |
| 1992 | 561 | +2.19% |
| 1993 | 588 | +4.81% |
| 1994 | 608 | +3.40% |
| 1995 | 649 | +6.74% |
| 1996 | 683 | +5.24% |

| Year | Pop. | ±% p.a. |
|---|---|---|
| 1997 | 748 | +9.52% |
| 1998 | 787 | +5.21% |
| 1999 | 821 | +4.32% |
| 2000 | 811 | −1.22% |
| 2001 | 831 | +2.47% |
| 2002 | 824 | −0.84% |
| 2003 | 863 | +4.73% |
| 2004 | 842 | −2.43% |
| 2005 | 837 | −0.59% |
| 2006 | 805 | −3.82% |
| 2007 | 799 | −0.75% |
| 2008 | 807 | +1.00% |
| 2009 | 779 | −3.47% |
| 2010 | 773 | −0.77% |
| 2011 | 768 | −0.65% |
| 2012 | 763 | −0.65% |
| 2013 | 747 | −2.10% |
| 2014 | 728 | −2.54% |
| 2015 | 735 | +0.96% |
| 2016 | 727 | −1.09% |
