= Brieskow-Finkenheerd =

- Municipality
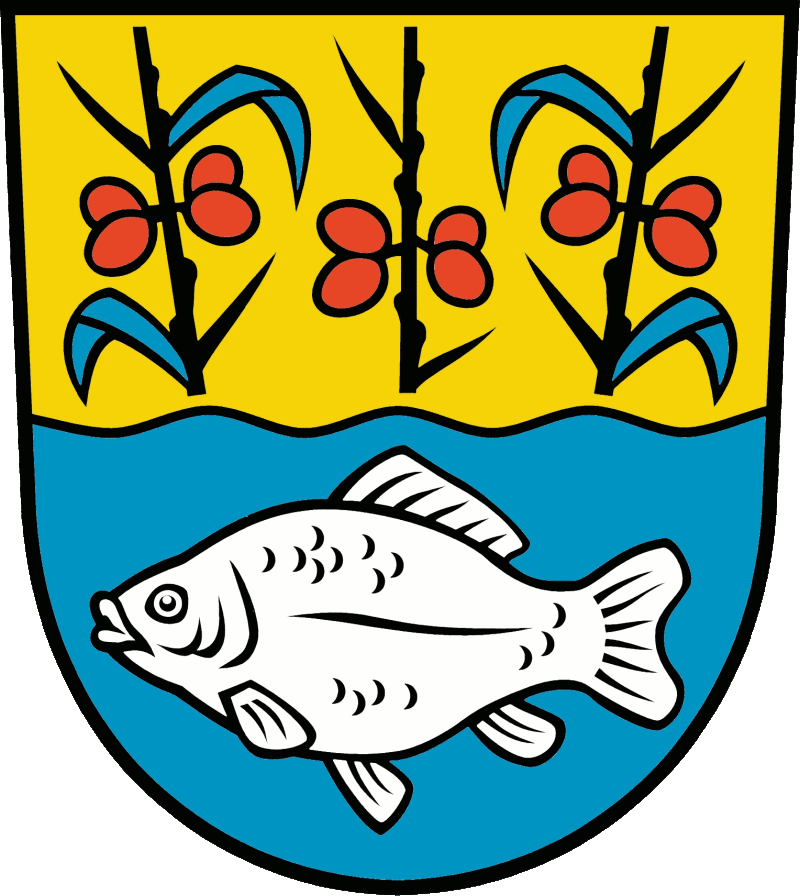
- Coat of arms

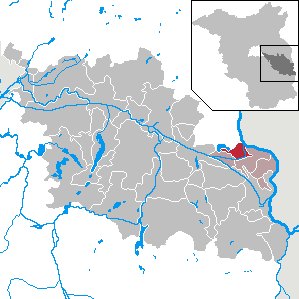
- Location of Brieskow-Finkenheerd within Oder-Spree district
- Interactive map of Brieskow-Finkenheerd
- Location within Germany Location within Brandenburg
- Coordinates: 52°16′00″N 14°34′59″E
- Country: Germany
- State: Brandenburg
- District: Oder-Spree
- Municipal assoc.: Brieskow-Finkenheerd

Government
  - Mayor (2024–29): Horst Siebke (SPD)

Area
  - Total: 13.47 km^{2} (5.20 sq mi)
- Elevation: 35 m (115 ft)

Population (2025-12-31)
  - Total: 2,253
  - Density: 167.3/km^{2} (433.2/sq mi)
- Time zone: UTC+01:00 (CET)
  - Summer (DST): UTC+02:00 (CEST)
- Postal codes: 15295
- Dialling codes: 033609
- Vehicle registration: LOS
- Website: www.amt-b-f.de

Brieskow-Finkenheerd is a municipality in the Oder-Spree district, in Brandenburg, Germany. It is located near the border with Poland.

== History ==
From 1815 to 1947, Brieskow-Finkenheerd was part of the Prussian Province of Brandenburg.

After World War II, Brieskow-Finkenheerd was incorporated into the State of Brandenburg from 1947 to 1952 and the Bezirk Frankfurt of East Germany from 1952 to 1990. Since 1990, Brieskow-Finkenheerd is again part of Brandenburg.

== Demography ==
Development of Population since 1875 within the Current Boundaries (Blue Line: Population; Dotted Line: Comparison to Population Development of Brandenburg state; Grey Background: Time of Nazi rule; Red Background: Time of Communist rule)

Brieskow-Finkenheerd: Population development
within the current boundaries (2013)

Year	Pop.	±% p.a.
1875	1,127	—
1890	1,359	+1.26%
1910	1,582	+0.76%
1925	2,220	+2.28%
1933	2,902	+3.41%
1939	2,942	+0.23%
1946	3,022	+0.38%
1950	3,472	+3.53%
1964	3,592	+0.24%
1971	3,431	−0.65%
1981	2,961	−1.46%
1985	2,753	−1.80%
1989	2,654	−0.91%
1990	2,633	−0.79%
1991	2,571	−2.35%
1992	2,523	−1.87%
1993	2,482	−1.63%
1994	2,535	+2.14%
1995	2,570	+1.38%
1996	2,593	+0.89%

Year	Pop.	±% p.a.
1997	2,643	+1.93%
1998	2,682	+1.48%
1999	2,679	−0.11%
2000	2,686	+0.26%
2001	2,716	+1.12%
2002	2,662	−1.99%
2003	2,651	−0.41%
2004	2,610	−1.55%
2005	2,585	−0.96%
2006	2,570	−0.58%
2007	2,539	−1.21%
2008	2,524	−0.59%
2009	2,476	−1.90%
2010	2,446	−1.21%
2011	2,388	−2.37%
2012	2,352	−1.51%
2013	2,348	−0.17%
2014	2,317	−1.32%
2015	2,320	+0.13%
2016	2,300	−0.86%

== Personalities ==
- Heinrich Tessenow (1876-1950), architect, designed the settlement Glückauf in Brieskow-Finkenheerd
