= Schlaube =

River in Germany

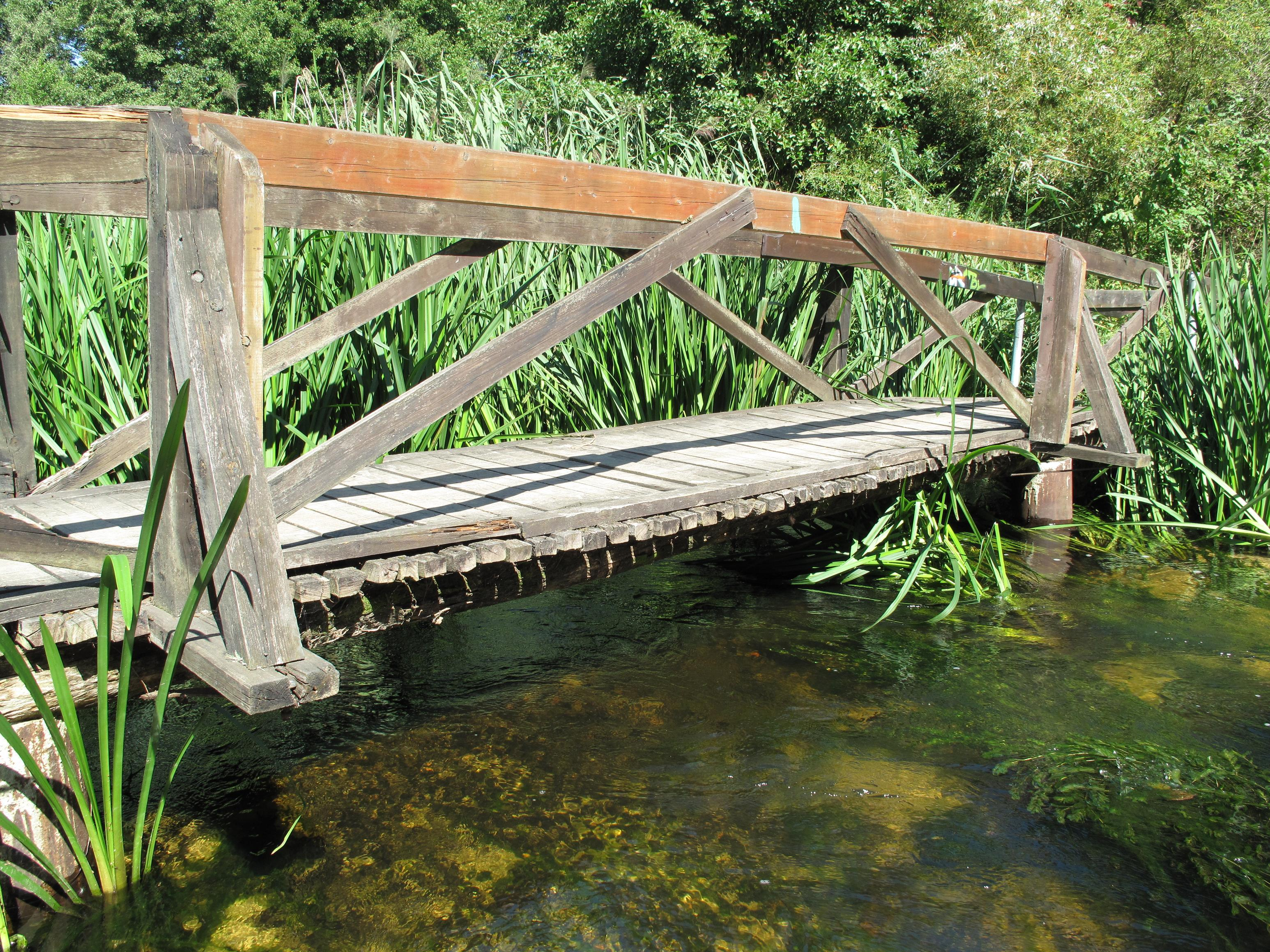

Location
- Country: Germany
- State: Brandenburg
- District: Oder-Spree
- Location: Schlaube Valley Nature Park

Physical characteristics
- Source
  - location: Wirchenberge, east of Groß Muckrow (part of Friedland)
  - elevation: 91 m (299 ft)
- Mouth
  - location: „Kleiner Müllroser See“ in Müllrose
  - coordinates: 52.2489°N 14.4128°E
  - elevation: 41 m (135 ft)
- Length: 20 km (12 mi)

Basin features
- Progression: Oder–Spree Canal→ Oder→ Baltic Sea

The Schlaube is a river in the district Oder-Spree, Brandenburg, Germany. It is in the Schlaube Valley Nature Park and flows more than 20 kilometres (12 mi) through the Schlaube-Valley (German: Schlaubetal), a tunnel valley of the last glacial period.

Its source is east of Groß Muckrow (part of Friedland) in the Wirchenberge (hill). After passing some lakes, including the Großer Müllroser See, the Schlaube ends in Müllrose into the Kleiner Müllroser See, which is connected with the Oder-Spree Canal.

== See also ==
- List of rivers of Brandenburg
