= Ziltendorf =

- Municipality
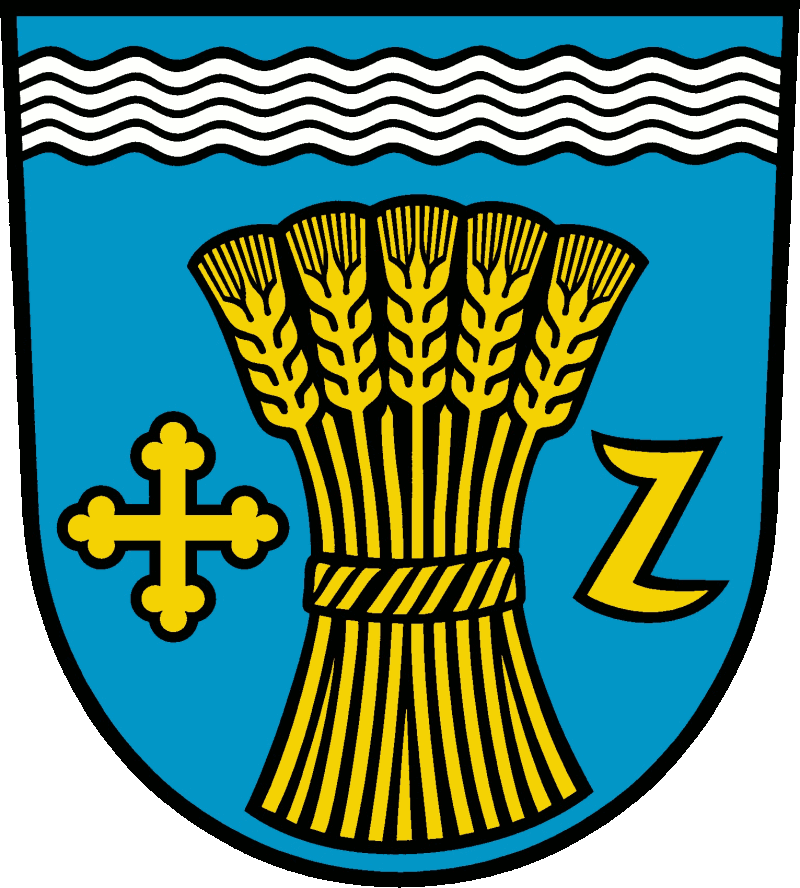
- Coat of arms

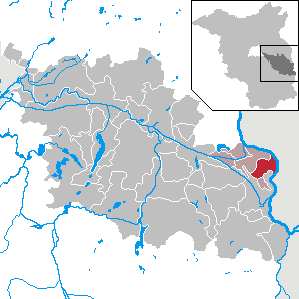
- Location of Ziltendorf within Oder-Spree district
- Interactive map of Ziltendorf
- Location within Germany Location within Brandenburg
- Coordinates: 52°13′00″N 14°39′00″E
- Country: Germany
- State: Brandenburg
- District: Oder-Spree
- Municipal assoc.: Brieskow-Finkenheerd
- Subdivisions: 2 districts

Government
  - Mayor (2024–29): Heiko Hillebrand

Area
  - Total: 29.21 km^{2} (11.28 sq mi)
- Elevation: 23 m (75 ft)

Population (2025-12-31)
  - Total: 1,413
  - Density: 48.37/km^{2} (125.3/sq mi)
- Time zone: UTC+01:00 (CET)
  - Summer (DST): UTC+02:00 (CEST)
- Postal codes: 15295
- Dialling codes: 033653
- Vehicle registration: LOS
- Website: www.ziltendorf.com

Ziltendorf is a municipality in the Oder-Spree district, in Brandenburg, Germany.

== History ==
From 1815 to 1947, Ziltendorf was part of the Prussian Province of Brandenburg.

After World War II, Ziltendorf was incorporated into the State of Brandenburg from 1947 to 1952 and the Bezirk Frankfurt of East Germany from 1952 to 1990. Since 1990, Ziltendorf has been part of Brandenburg.

== Demography ==
Development of Population since 1875 within the Current Boundaries (Blue Line: Population; Dotted Line: Comparison to Population Development of Brandenburg state; Grey Background: Time of Nazi rule; Red Background: Time of Communist rule)

Ziltendorf: Population development
within the current boundaries (2013)

Year	Pop.	±% p.a.
1875	1,197	—
1890	1,361	+0.86%
1910	1,376	+0.05%
1925	1,431	+0.26%
1933	1,503	+0.62%
1939	1,414	−1.01%
1946	1,699	+2.66%
1950	2,026	+4.50%
1964	1,772	−0.95%
1971	1,849	+0.61%
1981	1,648	−1.14%
1985	1,566	−1.27%
1989	1,523	−0.69%
1990	1,493	−1.97%
1991	1,474	−1.27%
1992	1,473	−0.07%
1993	1,488	+1.02%
1994	1,500	+0.81%
1995	1,499	−0.07%
1996	1,503	+0.27%

Year	Pop.	±% p.a.
1997	1,548	+2.99%
1998	1,568	+1.29%
1999	1,624	+3.57%
2000	1,658	+2.09%
2001	1,654	−0.24%
2002	1,668	+0.85%
2003	1,693	+1.50%
2004	1,695	+0.12%
2005	1,692	−0.18%
2006	1,685	−0.41%
2007	1,672	−0.77%
2008	1,650	−1.32%
2009	1,635	−0.91%
2010	1,613	−1.35%
2011	1,591	−1.36%
2012	1,584	−0.44%
2013	1,573	−0.69%
2014	1,561	−0.76%
2015	1,570	+0.58%
2016	1,528	−2.68%

== Mayor ==
Danny Langhagel (CDU) was elected in May 2014 for a term of five years.
