= Lawitz =

- Municipality
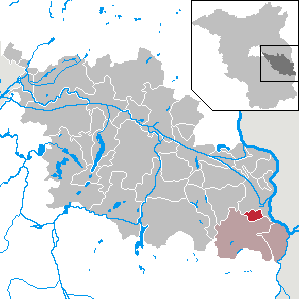
- Location of Lawitz within Oder-Spree district
- Interactive map of Lawitz
- Location within Germany Location within Brandenburg
- Coordinates: 52°06′56″N 14°38′18″E
- Country: Germany
- State: Brandenburg
- District: Oder-Spree
- Municipal assoc.: Neuzelle

Government
  - Mayor (2024–29): Andreas Grund

Area
  - Total: 6.00 km^{2} (2.32 sq mi)
- Elevation: 42 m (138 ft)

Population (2025-12-31)
  - Total: 556
  - Density: 92.7/km^{2} (240/sq mi)
- Time zone: UTC+01:00 (CET)
  - Summer (DST): UTC+02:00 (CEST)
- Postal codes: 15898
- Dialling codes: 033652
- Vehicle registration: LOS

Lawitz (Lower Sorbian Ławojce) is a municipality in the Oder-Spree district, in Brandenburg, Germany.

== History ==
From 1815 to 1947, Lawitz was part of the Prussian Province of Brandenburg.

After World War II, Lawitz was incorporated into the State of Brandenburg from 1947 to 1952 and the Bezirk Frankfurt of East Germany from 1952 to 1990. Since 1990, Lawitz is again part of Brandenburg.

== Demography ==
Development of Population since 1875 within the Current Boundaries (Blue Line: Population; Dotted Line: Comparison to Population Development of Brandenburg state; Grey Background: Time of Nazi rule; Red Background: Time of Communist rule)

Lawitz: Population development
within the current boundaries (2013)

Year	Pop.	±% p.a.
1875	424	—
1890	405	−0.31%
1910	365	−0.52%
1925	329	−0.69%
1933	360	+1.13%
1939	366	+0.28%
1946	475	+3.79%
1950	451	−1.29%
1964	386	−1.11%
1971	357	−1.11%
1981	330	−0.78%
1985	351	+1.55%
1989	370	+1.33%
1990	375	+1.35%
1991	375	+0.00%
1992	386	+2.93%
1993	383	−0.78%
1994	416	+8.62%
1995	431	+3.61%
1996	467	+8.35%

Year	Pop.	±% p.a.
1997	528	+13.06%
1998	621	+17.61%
1999	696	+12.08%
2000	703	+1.01%
2001	696	−1.00%
2002	690	−0.86%
2003	685	−0.72%
2004	683	−0.29%
2005	679	−0.59%
2006	670	−1.33%
2007	662	−1.19%
2008	641	−3.17%
2009	643	+0.31%
2010	628	−2.33%
2011	604	−3.82%
2012	606	+0.33%
2013	613	+1.16%
2014	605	−1.31%
2015	602	−0.50%
2016	596	−1.00%
