= Rietz-Neuendorf =

- Municipality
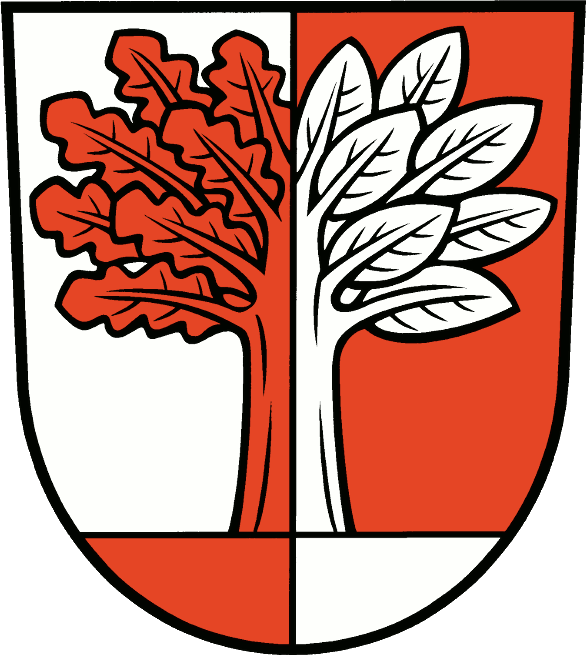
- Coat of arms

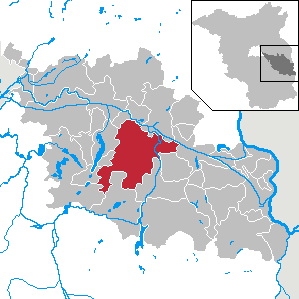
- Location of Rietz-Neuendorf within Oder-Spree district
- Interactive map of Rietz-Neuendorf
- Location within Germany Location within Brandenburg
- Coordinates: 52°13′59″N 14°10′00″E
- Country: Germany
- State: Brandenburg
- District: Oder-Spree
- Subdivisions: 14 districts

Government
  - Mayor (2020–28): Oliver Radzio (CDU)

Area
  - Total: 183.07 km^{2} (70.68 sq mi)
- Elevation: 79 m (259 ft)

Population (2025-12-31)
  - Total: 4,143
  - Density: 22.63/km^{2} (58.61/sq mi)
- Time zone: UTC+01:00 (CET)
  - Summer (DST): UTC+02:00 (CEST)
- Postal codes: 15526, 15848, 15864
- Dialling codes: 033672
- Vehicle registration: LOS
- Website: www.rietz-neuendorf.de

Rietz-Neuendorf is a municipality in the Oder-Spree district, in Brandenburg, Germany

== History ==
The municipality of Rietz-Neuendorf was formed on 31 December 2001 by merging the municipalities of Ahrensdorf, Birkholz, Buckow, Drahendorf, Görzig, Groß Rietz, Herzberg, Neubrück (Spree), Pfaffendorf, Sauen and Wilmersdorf.

From 1815 to 1947, the constituent localities of Rietz-Neuendorf were part of the Prussian Province of Brandenburg, from 1947 to 1952 of the State of Brandenburg, from 1952 to 1990 of the Bezirk Frankfurt of East Germany and since 1990 again of Brandenburg, since 2001 united as Rietz-Neuendorf.

Nearby are the Dubrower Berge, a range of wooded hills popular with hikers and cyclists.

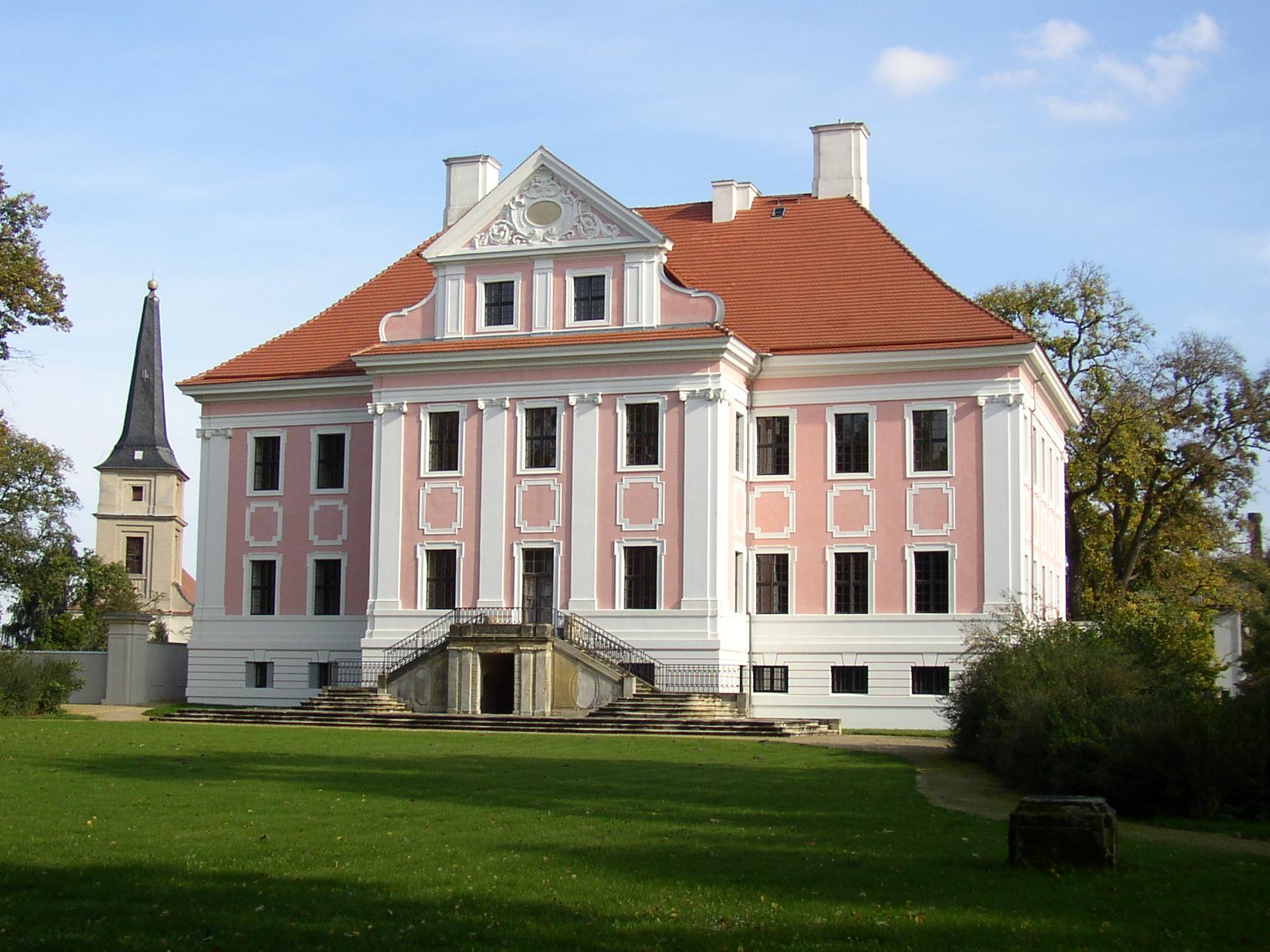
Gross Rietz castle

== Climate ==
The city experiences a degraded oceanic climate, common in the border of Germany-Poland (Köppen: Cfb). But due to its location to the east and interior (much more than most German cities), the climate is semicontinental, approaching Dfb, characterized for this using old normals and 0 °C isotherm.

The climate is similar with the south coast of Massachusetts (not island) where the strong continental influence is moderated by the sea, but still possessing extremes (hot summers but not above the pleasant threshold and cold winters with several days below zero but without the Arctic outbreaks). The west winds are weakened in their position in Central Europe, but more humid and hotter subtropics can still advance, making the city have four defined seasons of the year. The ecology of the area is the fruit of the mix of influences that sweep the eastern half of Germany, half west of Poland and the southernmost tip of Scandinavia.

Climate data for Rietz Neuendorf (Herzberg), elevation: 104 m, 1961-1990 normals and extremes
Month	Jan	Feb	Mar	Apr	May	Jun	Jul	Aug	Sep	Oct	Nov	Dec	Year
Record high °C (°F)	13.2 (55.8)	17.8 (64.0)	24.3 (75.7)	30.9 (87.6)	33.3 (91.9)	33.8 (92.8)	35.7 (96.3)	36.1 (97.0)	31.4 (88.5)	28.6 (83.5)	19.8 (67.6)	15.1 (59.2)	36.1 (97.0)
Mean daily maximum °C (°F)	1.2 (34.2)	3.1 (37.6)	7.6 (45.7)	13.0 (55.4)	18.6 (65.5)	22.0 (71.6)	23.5 (74.3)	23.2 (73.8)	19.1 (66.4)	13.5 (56.3)	6.9 (44.4)	2.7 (36.9)	12.9 (55.2)
Daily mean °C (°F)	−1.2 (29.8)	−0.1 (31.8)	3.4 (38.1)	7.9 (46.2)	13.1 (55.6)	16.5 (61.7)	17.9 (64.2)	17.6 (63.7)	13.9 (57.0)	9.3 (48.7)	4.1 (39.4)	0.4 (32.7)	8.6 (47.4)
Mean daily minimum °C (°F)	−3.6 (25.5)	−2.7 (27.1)	0.1 (32.2)	3.6 (38.5)	8.3 (46.9)	11.8 (53.2)	13.2 (55.8)	13.0 (55.4)	10.0 (50.0)	6.2 (43.2)	1.8 (35.2)	−1.8 (28.8)	5.0 (41.0)
Record low °C (°F)	−22.7 (−8.9)	−20.9 (−5.6)	−17.0 (1.4)	−6.1 (21.0)	−2.4 (27.7)	1.5 (34.7)	6.0 (42.8)	5.6 (42.1)	0.9 (33.6)	−5.4 (22.3)	−16.5 (2.3)	−21.5 (−6.7)	−22.7 (−8.9)
Average precipitation mm (inches)	39.0 (1.54)	34.0 (1.34)	36.0 (1.42)	41.0 (1.61)	59.0 (2.32)	65.0 (2.56)	53.0 (2.09)	63.0 (2.48)	41.0 (1.61)	39.0 (1.54)	44.0 (1.73)	50.0 (1.97)	564 (22.21)
Average precipitation days (≥ 1.0 mm)	10.0	8.0	9.0	9.0	9.0	9.0	9.0	8.0	8.0	8.0	10.0	11.0	108
Mean monthly sunshine hours	46.2	70.1	123.2	165.1	225.3	228.2	228.9	217.1	157.2	115.3	50.9	37.4	1,664.9
Source: NOAA

== Demography ==
Development of population since 1875 within the current Boundaries (Blue Line: Population; Dotted Line: Comparison to Population development in Brandenburg state; Grey Background: Time of Nazi Germany; Red Background: Time of communist East Germany)

Recent Population Development and Projections (Population Development before Census 2011 (blue line); Recent Population Development according to the Census in Germany in 2011 (blue bordered line); Official projections for 2005-2030 (yellow line); for 2017-2030 (scarlet line); for 2020-2030 (green line)

Rietz-Neuendorf: Population development
within the current boundaries (2020)

Year	Pop.	±% p.a.
1875	5,070	—
1890	5,468	+0.51%
1910	5,632	+0.15%
1925	5,511	−0.14%
1939	5,384	−0.17%
1950	7,446	+2.99%
1964	5,769	−1.81%

Year	Pop.	±% p.a.
1971	5,626	−0.36%
1981	4,672	−1.84%
1985	4,688	+0.09%
1990	4,529	−0.69%
1995	4,515	−0.06%
2000	4,576	+0.27%
2005	4,482	−0.41%

Year	Pop.	±% p.a.
2010	4,232	−1.14%
2015	4,124	−0.52%
2016	4,109	−0.36%
2017	4,080	−0.71%
2018	4,102	+0.54%
2019	4,098	−0.10%
2020	4,108	+0.24%
