= Diensdorf-Radlow =

- Municipality
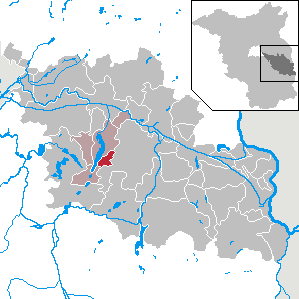
- Location of Diensdorf-Radlow within Oder-Spree district
- Interactive map of Diensdorf-Radlow
- Location within Germany Location within Brandenburg
- Coordinates: 52°13′59″N 14°03′00″E
- Country: Germany
- State: Brandenburg
- District: Oder-Spree
- Municipal assoc.: Scharmützelsee
- Subdivisions: 2 districts

Government
  - Mayor (2024–29): Stefan Petrick

Area
  - Total: 9.34 km^{2} (3.61 sq mi)
- Elevation: 45 m (148 ft)

Population (2025-12-31)
  - Total: 636
  - Density: 68.1/km^{2} (176/sq mi)
- Time zone: UTC+01:00 (CET)
  - Summer (DST): UTC+02:00 (CEST)
- Postal codes: 15864
- Dialling codes: 033677
- Vehicle registration: LOS
- Website: www.amt-scharmuetzelsee.de

Diensdorf-Radlow is a municipality in the Oder-Spree district, in Brandenburg, Germany.

== History ==
On 1 January 1962, the municipality of Diensdorf-Radlow was formed by merging the municipalities of Diensdorf and Radlow.

From 1815 to 1947, the constituent localities of Diensdorf-Radlow were part of the Prussian Province of Brandenburg.

After World War II, Diensdorf and Radlow were incorporated into the State of Brandenburg from 1947 to 1952 and the Bezirk Frankfurt of East Germany from 1952 to 1990. Since 1990, Diensdorf-Radlow is again part of Brandenburg.

== Demography ==
Development of Population since 1875 within the Current Boundaries (Blue Line: Population; Dotted Line: Comparison to Population Development of Brandenburg state; Grey Background: Time of Nazi rule; Red Background: Time of Communist rule)

Diensdorf-Radlow: Population development
within the current boundaries (2013)

Year	Pop.	±% p.a.
1875	300	—
1890	304	+0.09%
1910	364	+0.90%
1925	402	+0.66%
1933	387	−0.47%
1939	413	+1.09%
1946	631	+6.24%
1950	633	+0.08%
1964	526	−1.31%
1971	526	+0.00%
1981	545	+0.36%
1985	560	+0.68%
1989	535	−1.14%
1990	532	−0.56%
1991	521	−2.07%
1992	526	+0.96%
1993	513	−2.47%
1994	491	−4.29%
1995	510	+3.87%
1996	524	+2.75%

Year	Pop.	±% p.a.
1997	533	+1.72%
1998	535	+0.38%
1999	558	+4.30%
2000	551	−1.25%
2001	567	+2.90%
2002	540	−4.76%
2003	555	+2.78%
2004	558	+0.54%
2005	554	−0.72%
2006	548	−1.08%
2007	555	+1.28%
2008	541	−2.52%
2009	567	+4.81%
2010	570	+0.53%
2011	565	−0.88%
2012	558	−1.24%
2013	553	−0.90%
2014	567	+2.53%
2015	564	−0.53%
2016	567	+0.53%
