= Langewahl =

- Municipality
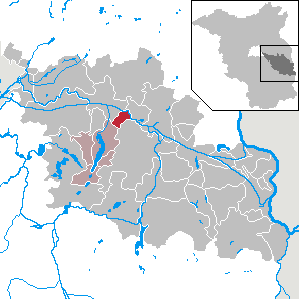
- Location of Langewahl within Oder-Spree district
- Interactive map of Langewahl
- Location within Germany Location within Brandenburg
- Coordinates: 52°20′N 14°06′E
- Country: Germany
- State: Brandenburg
- District: Oder-Spree
- Municipal assoc.: Scharmützelsee

Government
  - Mayor (2024–29): Bärbel Kleinschmidt (Ind.)

Area
  - Total: 13.27 km^{2} (5.12 sq mi)
- Elevation: 43 m (141 ft)

Population (2025-12-31)
  - Total: 846
  - Density: 63.8/km^{2} (165/sq mi)
- Time zone: UTC+01:00 (CET)
  - Summer (DST): UTC+02:00 (CEST)
- Postal codes: 15518
- Dialling codes: 03361
- Vehicle registration: LOS
- Website: www.amt-scharmuetzelsee.de

Langewahl is a municipality in the Oder-Spree district, in Brandenburg, Germany.

Nearby are the Dubrower Berge a range of wooded hills popular with hikers and cyclists.

== Demography ==
Development of population since 1875 within the current Boundaries (Blue Line: Population; Dotted Line: Comparison to Population development in Brandenburg state; Grey Background: Time of Nazi Germany; Red Background: Time of communist East Germany)

Langewahl: Population development
within the current boundaries (2013)

Year	Pop.	±% p.a.
1875	452	—
1890	516	+0.89%
1910	611	+0.85%
1925	749	+1.37%
1933	866	+1.83%
1939	963	+1.79%
1946	945	−0.27%
1950	944	−0.03%
1964	839	−0.84%
1971	824	−0.26%
1981	734	−1.15%
1985	720	−0.48%
1989	711	−0.31%
1990	704	−0.98%
1991	698	−0.85%
1992	693	−0.72%
1993	700	+1.01%
1994	691	−1.29%
1995	704	+1.88%
1996	704	+0.00%

Year	Pop.	±% p.a.
1997	716	+1.70%
1998	715	−0.14%
1999	729	+1.96%
2000	752	+3.16%
2001	786	+4.52%
2002	817	+3.94%
2003	836	+2.33%
2004	839	+0.36%
2005	831	−0.95%
2006	856	+3.01%
2007	846	−1.17%
2008	828	−2.13%
2009	824	−0.48%
2010	820	−0.49%
2011	812	−0.98%
2012	814	+0.25%
2013	819	+0.61%
2014	845	+3.17%
2015	850	+0.59%
2016	838	−1.41%
