= Scharmützelsee (Amt) =

- Amt
- Map of Oder-Spree highlighting Scharmützelsee
- Interactive map of Scharmützelsee
- Location within Germany Location within Brandenburg
- Coordinates: 52°17′N 14°04′E
- Country: Germany
- State: Brandenburg
- District: Oder-Spree
- Seat: Bad Saarow
- Subdivisions: 5 municipalities

Area
  - Total: 124.53 km^{2} (48.08 sq mi)

Population (2025-12-31)
  - Total: 10,605
  - Density: 85.160/km^{2} (220.56/sq mi)
- Time zone: UTC+01:00 (CET)
  - Summer (DST): UTC+02:00 (CEST)
- Website: www.amt-scharmuetzelsee.de

Amt Scharmützelsee is an Amt ("collective municipality") in the district of Oder-Spree, in Brandenburg, Germany. Its seat is in Bad Saarow.

The Amt Scharmützelsee consists of the following municipalities:

1. Bad Saarow
2. Diensdorf-Radlow
3. Langewahl
4. Reichenwalde
5. Wendisch Rietz

== Demography ==
Development of Population since 1875 within the Current Boundaries (Blue Line: Population; Dotted Line: Comparison to Population Development of Brandenburg state; Grey Background: Time of Nazi rule; Red Background: Time of Communist rule)

Recent Population Development and Projections (Population Development before Census 2011 (blue line); Recent Population Development according to the Census in Germany in 2011 (blue bordered line); Official projections for 2005-2030 (yellow line); for 2017-2030 (scarlet line); for 2020-2030 (green line)

Amt Scharmützelsee: Population development
within the current boundaries (2020)

Year	Pop.	±% p.a.
1875	3,365	—
1890	3,422	+0.11%
1910	3,800	+0.53%
1925	4,855	+1.65%
1939	6,521	+2.13%
1950	7,915	+1.78%
1964	7,593	−0.30%
1971	7,691	+0.18%
1981	7,840	+0.19%

Year	Pop.	±% p.a.
1985	7,896	+0.18%
1990	7,938	+0.11%
1995	7,889	−0.12%
2000	8,368	+1.19%
2005	8,699	+0.78%
2010	8,785	+0.20%
2015	9,311	+1.17%
2020	10,433	+2.30%
2025	10,605	+0.33%
