= Christa Zellmer =

German politician (1930–2002)

- Zellmer c. 1978

First Secretary of the Socialist Unity Party in Bezirk Frankfurt (Oder)
- In office 3 November 1988 – 11 November 1989
- Second Secretary: Günter Grell
- Preceded by: Hans-Joachim Hertwig
- Succeeded by: Bernd Meier

Personal details
- Born: Christa Holzheuer; 5 November 1930 Ströbitz, Province of Brandenburg, Free State of Prussia, Weimar Republic (now Cottbus-Ströbitz, Brandenburg, Germany)
- Died: 14 October 2002 (aged 71) Frankfurt (Oder), Brandenburg, Germany
- Party: Socialist Unity Party (1947–1989)
- Education: "Karl Marx" Party Academy (Dipl.-Ges.-Wiss.)
- Occupation: Politician; Party Functionary; Saleswoman
- Awards: Patriotic Order of Merit, 2nd class
- Central institution membership: 1975–1989: Full member, Central Committee; 1971–1975: Candidate member, Central Committee; Other offices held: 1966–1988: Secretary for Agitation and Propaganda, Socialist Unity Party in Bezirk Frankfurt (Oder); 1965–1966: Secretary, Bezirk Frankfurt (Oder) Council

Christa Zellmer (née Holzheuer; 5 November 1930 – 14 October 2002) was a German politician and party functionary of the Socialist Unity Party (SED).

One of only a handful of women in the SED's nomenklatura, Zellmer was a member of the Central Committee of the SED and briefly served as First Secretary of the SED in Bezirk Frankfurt (Oder) for a year on the eve of the Peaceful Revolution.

== Life and career ==
=== Early career ===
Zellmer was born as the daughter of a working-class family. After attending primary school, she completed a commercial apprenticeship and subsequently worked as a retail saleswoman. In 1950, she took over the management of a youth sales outlet in Cottbus.

In June 1947, she became a member of the ruling Socialist Unity Party (SED). From 1952 to 1965, she served as the secretary of the Bezirk Frankfurt (Oder) Democratic Women's League of Germany (DFD), a SED-controlled mass organization.

After studying at the SED's "Karl Marx" Party Academy and graduating with a diploma in social sciences (Dipl.-Ges.-Wiss.) in 1965, she was assigned as secretary to the Bezirk Frankfurt (Oder) Council, making her a full-time member of the Bezirk government.

In February 1966, she was made secretary for Agitation and Propaganda of the Bezirk Frankfurt (Oder) SED, succeeding Wilfried Maaß, who had been appointed deputy minister for culture. In 1967, she was one of only three women among the 119 members of the SED Bezirk secretariats.

She additionally became a candidate member of the Central Committee of the SED in June 1971 (VIII. Party Congress) and a full member in June 1975, serving until its collective resignation in December 1989.

During her 22-year tenure as secretary, she wrote two books about Bezirk Frankfurt (Oder).

Zellmer was awarded the Patriotic Order of Merit in bronze in 1969 and in silver in 1976.

=== Bezirk Frankfurt (Oder) SED First Secretary ===
On 28 September 1988, Bezirk Frankfurt (Oder) SED First Secretary Hans-Joachim Hertwig surprisingly died at the age of 60. Second Secretary Günter Grell was unusually passed over in favor of Zellmer, who was elected to succeeded Hertwig on 3 November 1988.

It was the first and only time that a woman became the First Secretary of a Bezirk SED.

=== Peaceful Revolution ===
During the Peaceful Revolution, on 11 November 1989, she and the entire Bezirk Frankfurt (Oder) SED Secretariat resigned, citing their shared responsibility for the accumulated problems in the Bezirk as the reason for their resignation. Zellmer asked Bernd Meier, party secretary at the Schwedt Petrochemical Combine, to succeed her.

=== Reunified Germany ===
Zellmer passed away in Frankfurt (Oder) in 2002 at the age of 71.
