= Neuzelle (Amt) =

- Amt
- Map of Oder-Spree highlighting Neuzelle
- Interactive map of Neuzelle
- Location within Germany Location within Brandenburg
- Coordinates: 52°05′N 14°38′E
- Country: Germany
- State: Brandenburg
- District: Oder-Spree
- Seat: Neuzelle
- Subdivisions: 3 municipalities

Area
  - Total: 184.27 km^{2} (71.15 sq mi)

Population (2025-12-31)
  - Total: 6,304
  - Density: 34.21/km^{2} (88.61/sq mi)
- Time zone: UTC+01:00 (CET)
  - Summer (DST): UTC+02:00 (CEST)
- Website: www.neuzelle.de

Amt Neuzelle is an Amt ("collective municipality") in the district of Oder-Spree, in Brandenburg, Germany. Its seat is in Neuzelle.

The Amt Neuzelle consists of the following municipalities:

1. Lawitz
2. Neißemünde
3. Neuzelle

== Demography ==
Development of population since 1875 within the current Boundaries (Blue Line: Population; Dotted Line: Comparison to Population development in Brandenburg state; Grey Background: Time of Nazi Germany; Red Background: Time of communist East Germany)

Recent Population Development and Projections (Population Development before Census 2011 (blue line); Recent Population Development according to the Census in Germany in 2011 (blue bordered line); Official projections for 2005-2030 (yellow line); for 2017-2030 (scarlet line); for 2020-2030 (green line)

Amt Neuzelle: Population development
within the current boundaries (2020)

| Year | Pop. | ±% p.a. |
|---|---|---|
| 1875 | 8,414 | — |
| 1890 | 8,151 | −0.21% |
| 1910 | 7,606 | −0.35% |
| 1925 | 7,469 | −0.12% |
| 1939 | 7,456 | −0.01% |
| 1950 | 10,374 | +3.05% |
| 1964 | 8,507 | −1.41% |
| 1971 | 7,684 | −1.44% |
| 1981 | 6,731 | −1.32% |

| Year | Pop. | ±% p.a. |
|---|---|---|
| 1985 | 6,537 | −0.73% |
| 1990 | 6,224 | −0.98% |
| 1995 | 6,692 | +1.46% |
| 2000 | 7,282 | +1.70% |
| 2005 | 7,204 | −0.22% |
| 2010 | 6,860 | −0.97% |
| 2015 | 6,514 | −1.03% |
| 2020 | 6,467 | −0.14% |
| 2025 | 6,304 | −0.51% |
