= Bernd Meier (politician) =

German politician (1944–2005)

First Secretary of the Socialist Unity Party in Bezirk Frankfurt (Oder)
- In office 15 November 1989 – February 1990
- Second Secretary: Axel Henschke
- Preceded by: Christa Zellmer
- Succeeded by: Position abolished
Volkskammer
Member of the Volkskammer for Bezirk Frankfurt (Oder)
In office 5 April 1990 – 2 October 1990
Preceded by	Constituency established
Succeeded by	Constituency abolished

Personal details
- Born: Bernd Meier; 28 December 1944 Cainsdorf, Free State of Saxony, Germany
- Died: 30 May 2005 (aged 60)
- Party: Independent (1990–2005)
- Other political affiliations: Party of Democratic Socialism (1989–1990); Socialist Unity Party (1963–1989)
- Education: "Karl Marx" Party Academy (Dipl.-Ges.-Wiss.)
- Occupation: Politician; Party Functionary; Machinist
- Awards: Artur Becker Medal
- Central institution membership: 1989–1990: Member, PDS Party Executive; 1979–1985: Member, FDJ Central Council; Other offices held: 1985–1989: First Secretary, Socialist Unity Party at PCK Schwedt; 1979–1985: First Secretary, Free German Youth in Bezirk Frankfurt; 1974–1978: Second Secretary, Free German Youth in Bezirk Frankfurt

Bernd Meier (28 December 1944 – 30 May 2005) was a German politician (SED/PDS) and official of the FDJ. He served as first party secretary of the party leadership ("Bezirksleitung") for the Frankfurt (Oder) region and then as a member of the national parliament (Volkskammer) during the eventful run-up to reunification.

== Life ==
Bernd Meier was born, the youngest of six siblings, during the closing months of the Second World War at Cainsdorf (then just outside Zwickau). His father, a carpenter, was killed in the war. He attended school locally between 1952 and 1962, joining the Free German Youth ("Freie Deutsche Jugend" / FDJ) - effectively the youth wing of East Germany's ruling Socialist Unity Party in 1960, and on leaving school undertaking an apprenticeship as a machinist at the Crossen-Mulde paper mill. After that he worked as an insulation-plumber at the PCK Petro-chemicals plant at Schwedt.

In 1963, the year of his nineteenth birthday, he joined the ruling SED (party). During 1964/65 he undertook his military service as a public service worker in Karl-Marx Stadt (as Chemnitz was known at that time). Next he was employed at the Buna Schkopau Chemicals plant and then back at the PCK plant at Schwedt. During 1967/68 studied at the regional "Karl Marx" Party Academy in Frankfurt. Between 1968 and 1971 he served as district secretary for the FDJ in the Angermünde and Schwedt district. Then, between 1971 and 1974, he studied at the party's "Karl Marx" academy, emerging with a degree in Social sciences. The degree and the institution that had awarded it marked him out as a party high-flyer, and between 1974 and 1978 he served as second secretary of the Frankfurt region FDJ. He then, in January 1979, succeeded Hans Andreas as the organisation's national first secretary, also becoming an FDJ national council member. In his home region he served as a member of the SED regional party leadership team ("Bezirksleitung") from February 1989 till 1990, and of its controlling secretariat till 1985. In addition, from June 1981 he became a delegate and chairmen of the Permanent Commission of Youth Questions, physical well-being ("Körperkultur") and Sport, attached to the Frankfurt (Oder) district council.

Under the Leninist precepts that defined the East German socio-political structure, comrades were required to live (and work) by the mantra "Where there is a comrade, the party is there too" (Wo ein Genosse ist, da ist die Partei). Between 1985 and 1989 Bernd Meier held the key position of secretary to the national party leadership at the Schwedt Petro-chemicals conglomerate where he was also party organiser on behalf of the Party Central Committee.

On 15 November 1989 Meier was elected first secretary for the Frankfurt party leadership team in succession to Christa Zellmer. The position was one of considerable power and "election" to it was traditionally a somewhat opaque top-down affair. It was a mark of how far the changes of 1989 had progressed that his own election was conducted in a conscientious and far from traditional manner as party officials at all level felt their way towards a more democratic way of doing things. Meier discussed the experience with a western interviewer a couple of months later. On 3 December 1989 he was elected a member of the working group mandated to prepare for the extraordinary SED party conference, at which, on 10 December 1989, he was elected a member of the SED party executive. By now it was obvious that the SED was no longer a "Marxist-Leninist party". During the conference the party accepted a proposal from Gregor Gysi, who had become party chairman earlier in the month, that the party adopt a new name, "Party of Democratic Socialism" / PDS in order to distance the reformed party from its repressive past. Between February and October 1990 Bernd Meier was a member of the PDS presidium. At East Germany's first (and as matters turned out last)free general election, held in March 1990, he was elected as a PDS member of the country's parliament ("Volkskammer"), representing the Frankfurt/Oder electoral district. He served as "business manager" (als " Parlamentarischer Geschäftsführer") for the (massively reduced) PDS group in the assembly.

Reunification took place, formally, in October 1990. Bernd Meier was not among the PDS Volkskammer members who transferred to the Bundestag, and he lived his final fifteen years away from the public sphere.
