= Brieskow-Finkenheerd (Amt) =

- Amt
- Map of Oder-Spree highlighting Brieskow-Finkenheerd
- Interactive map of Brieskow-Finkenheerd
- Location within Germany Location within Brandenburg
- Coordinates: 52°15′N 14°34′E
- Country: Germany
- State: Brandenburg
- District: Oder-Spree
- Seat: Brieskow-Finkenheerd
- Subdivisions: 5 municipalities

Area
  - Total: 93.37 km^{2} (36.05 sq mi)

Population (2025-12-31)
  - Total: 7,244
  - Density: 77.58/km^{2} (200.9/sq mi)
- Time zone: UTC+01:00 (CET)
  - Summer (DST): UTC+02:00 (CEST)
- Website: www.amt-b-f.de

Amt Brieskow-Finkenheerd is an Amt ("collective municipality") in the district of Oder-Spree, in Brandenburg, Germany. Its seat is in Brieskow-Finkenheerd.

The Amt Brieskow-Finkenheerd consists of the following municipalities:

1. Brieskow-Finkenheerd
2. Groß Lindow
3. Vogelsang
4. Wiesenau
5. Ziltendorf

== Demography ==
Development of Population since 1875 within the Current Boundaries (Blue Line: Population; Dotted Line: Comparison to Population Development of Brandenburg state; Grey Background: Time of Nazi rule; Red Background: Time of Communist rule)

Recent Population Development and Projections (Population Development before Census 2011 (blue line); Recent Population Development according to the Census in Germany in 2011 (blue bordered line); Official projections for 2005-2030 (yellow line); for 2017-2030 (scarlet line); for 2020-2030 (green line)

Amt Brieskow-Finkenheerd: Population development
within the current boundaries (2020)

Year	Pop.	±% p.a.
1875	5,359	—
1890	5,868	+0.61%
1910	6,483	+0.50%
1925	7,419	+0.90%
1939	9,037	+1.42%
1950	10,098	+1.01%
1964	9,367	−0.54%
1971	9,112	−0.39%
1981	7,994	−1.30%

Year	Pop.	±% p.a.
1985	7,570	−1.35%
1990	7,208	−0.98%
1995	7,449	+0.66%
2000	8,385	+2.40%
2005	8,421	+0.09%
2010	8,003	−1.01%
2015	7,629	−0.95%
2020	7,520	−0.29%
2025	7,244	−0.75%
