= Mixdorf =

- Municipality
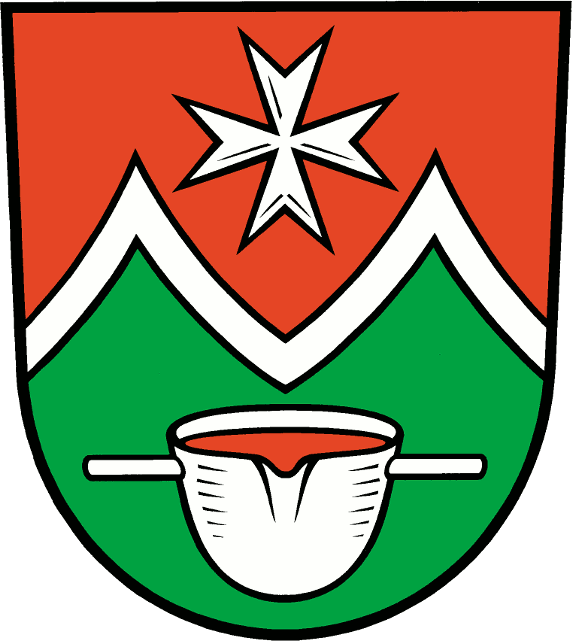
- Coat of arms

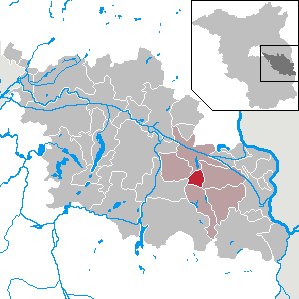
- Location of Mixdorf within Oder-Spree district
- Interactive map of Mixdorf
- Location within Germany Location within Brandenburg
- Coordinates: 52°12′N 14°24′E
- Country: Germany
- State: Brandenburg
- District: Oder-Spree
- Municipal assoc.: Schlaubetal

Government
  - Mayor (2024–29): Andreas Apel

Area
  - Total: 13.03 km^{2} (5.03 sq mi)
- Elevation: 61 m (200 ft)

Population (2025-12-31)
  - Total: 880
  - Density: 68/km^{2} (170/sq mi)
- Time zone: UTC+01:00 (CET)
  - Summer (DST): UTC+02:00 (CEST)
- Postal codes: 15299
- Dialling codes: 033655
- Vehicle registration: LOS

Mixdorf is a municipality in the Oder-Spree district, in Brandenburg, Germany.

== History ==
From 1815 to 1947, Mixdorf was part of the Prussian Province of Brandenburg.

After World War II, Mixdorf was incorporated into the State of Brandenburg from 1947 to 1952 and the Bezirk Frankfurt of East Germany from 1952 to 1990. Since 1990, Mixdorf is again part of Brandenburg.

== Demography ==
Development of Population since 1875 within the Current Boundaries (Blue Line: Population; Dotted Line: Comparison to Population Development of Brandenburg state; Grey Background: Time of Nazi rule; Red Background: Time of Communist rule)

Mixdorf: Population development
within the current boundaries (2020)

Year	Pop.	±% p.a.
1875	670	—
1890	317	−4.87%
1910	312	−0.08%
1925	307	−0.11%
1933	288	−0.80%
1939	268	−1.19%
1946	388	+5.43%
1950	360	−1.86%
1964	316	−0.93%
1971	313	−0.14%
1981	263	−1.73%
1985	279	+1.49%
1989	265	−1.28%
1990	262	−1.13%
1991	259	−1.15%
1992	277	+6.95%
1993	389	+40.43%
1994	634	+62.98%
1995	838	+32.18%
1996	958	+14.32%
1997	1,032	+7.72%
1998	1,063	+3.00%

Year	Pop.	±% p.a.
1999	1,074	+1.03%
2000	1,060	−1.30%
2001	1,055	−0.47%
2002	1,051	−0.38%
2003	1,043	−0.76%
2004	1,037	−0.58%
2005	1,020	−1.64%
2006	1,009	−1.08%
2007	993	−1.59%
2008	972	−2.11%
2009	958	−1.44%
2010	955	−0.31%
2011	940	−1.57%
2012	927	−1.38%
2013	914	−1.40%
2014	917	+0.33%
2015	906	−1.20%
2016	912	+0.66%
2017	907	−0.55%
2018	908	+0.11%
2019	902	−0.66%
2020	914	+1.33%
