= Schlaube Valley Nature Park =

Coordinates: 52°04′54″N 14°28′34″E

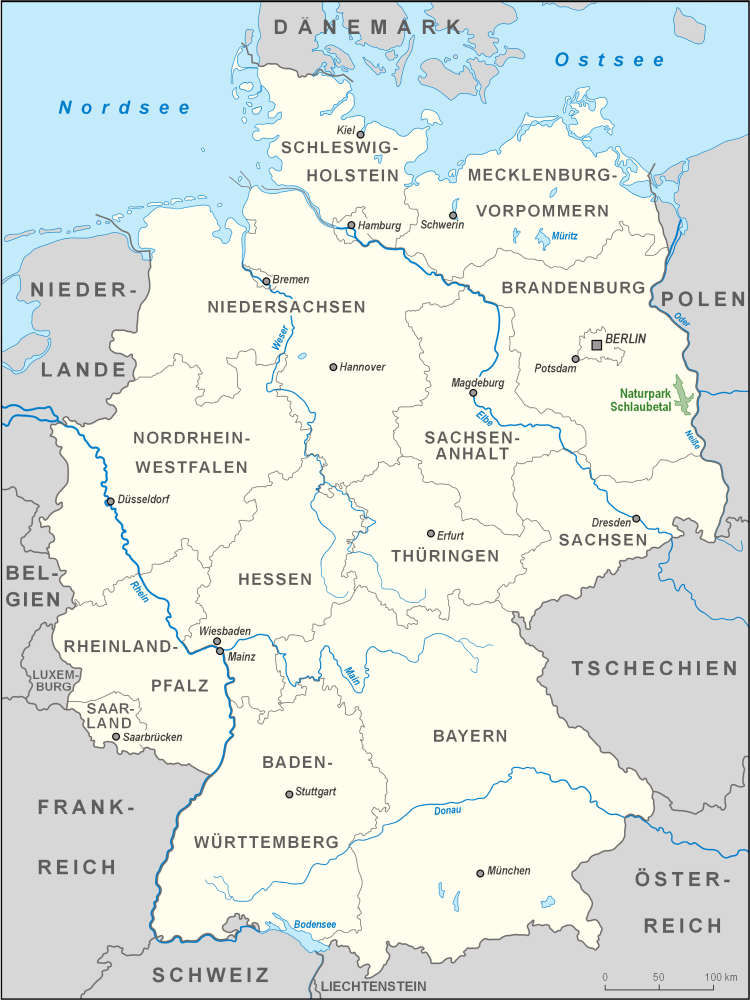

Schlaube Valley Nature Park is a nature park and reserve in the state of Brandenburg, Germany. It covers 225 square kilometres (87 sq mi). It was established on December 27, 1995.

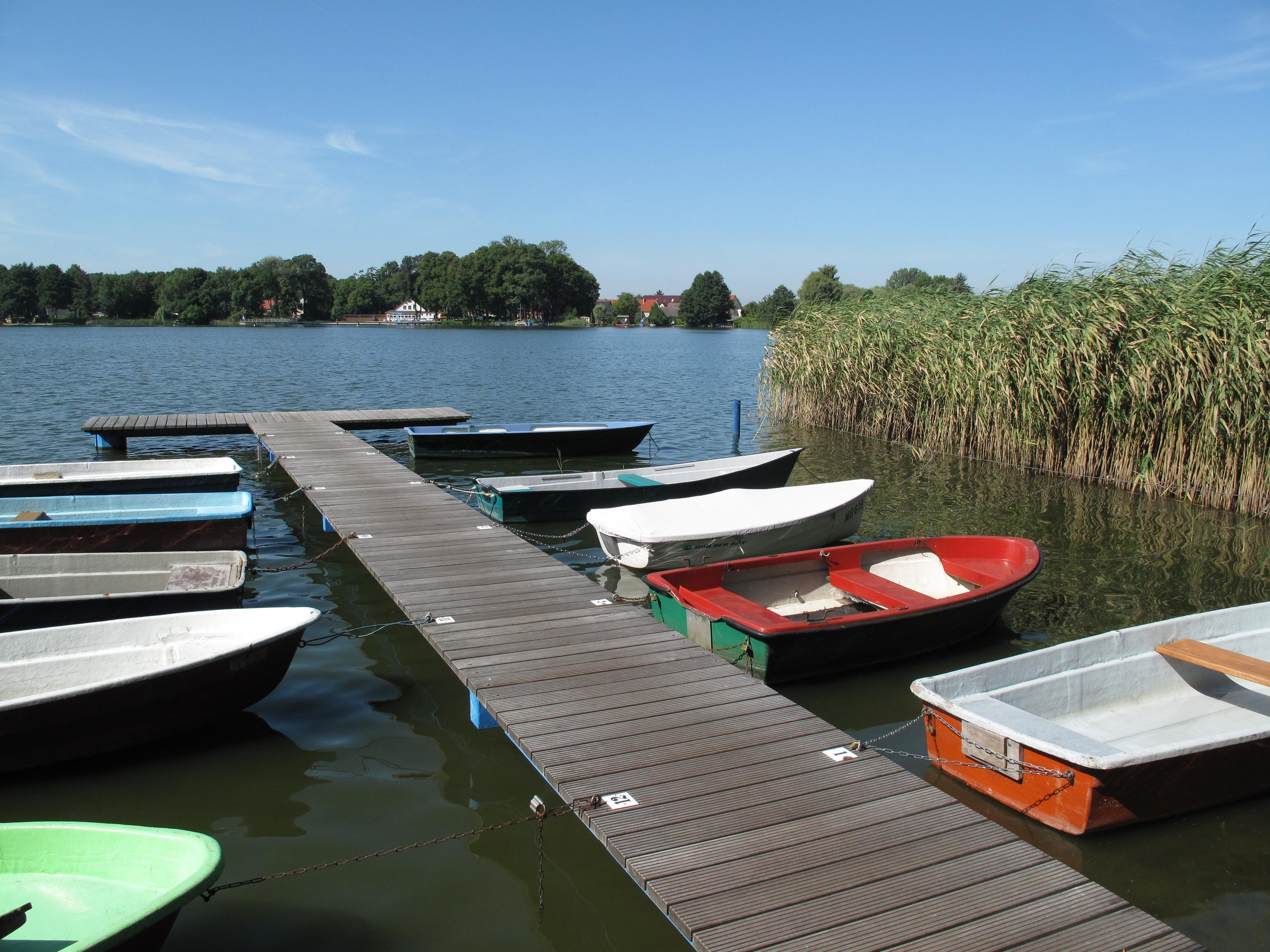
Großer Müllroser See

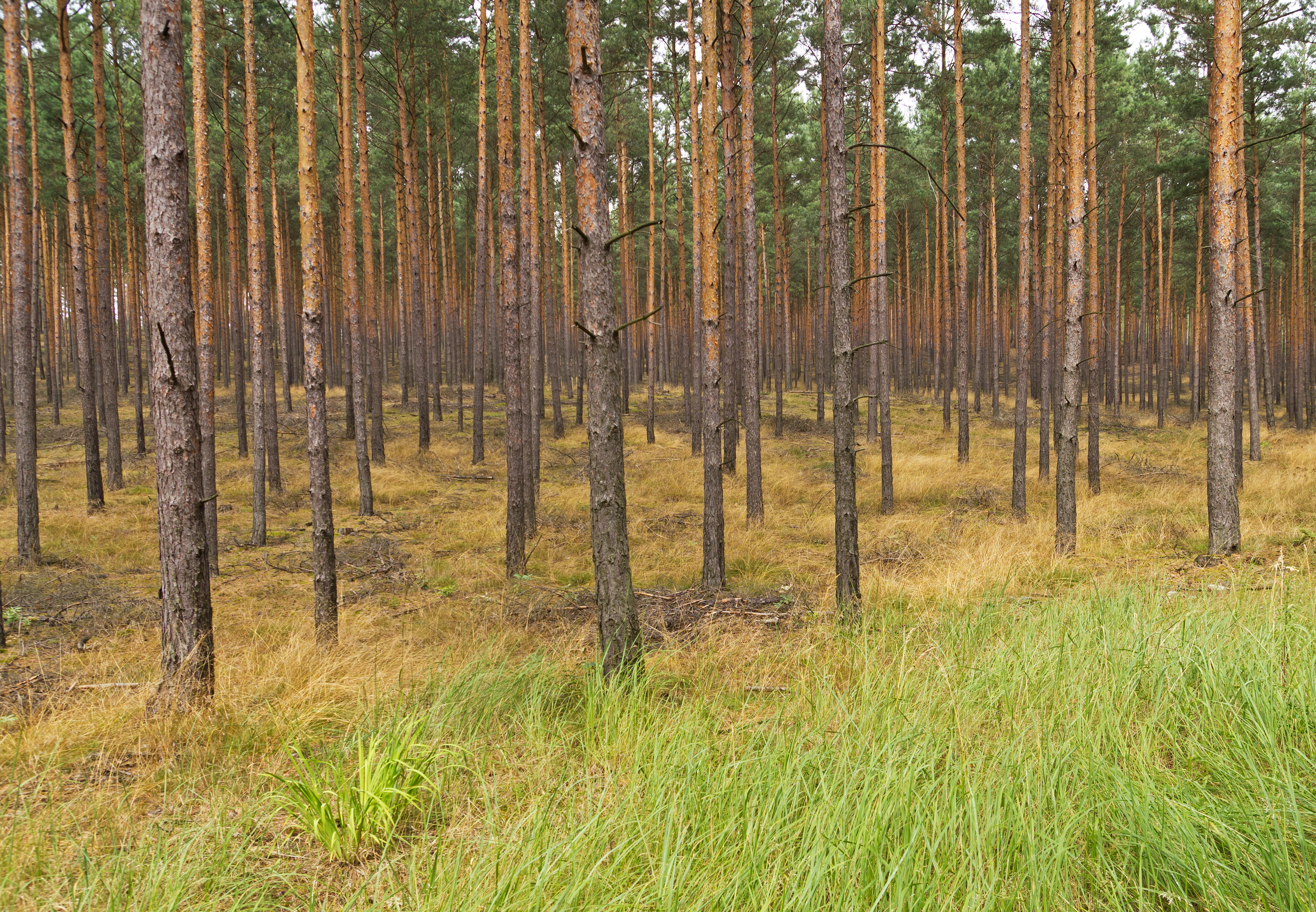
Pine forest

With a surface area of 1.32 square kilometres (0.51 sq mi), the Großer Müllroser See, through which the river Schlaube flows, is its largest lake.
