= Oder-Spree =

Coordinates: 52°13′N 14°17′E

- District
- Flag Coat of arms
- Country: Germany
- State: Brandenburg
- Capital: Beeskow

Government
  - District admin.: Frank Steffen (SPD)

Area
  - Total: 2,242 km^{2} (866 sq mi)

Population (31 December 2025)
  - Total: 179,142
  - Density: 79.90/km^{2} (206.9/sq mi)
- Time zone: UTC+01:00 (CET)
  - Summer (DST): UTC+02:00 (CEST)
- Vehicle registration: LOS, FW, BSK, EH
- Website: landkreis-oder-spree.de

Oder-Spree is a Kreis (district) in the eastern part of Brandenburg, Germany. Neighboring are (from north clockwise) the district Märkisch-Oderland, the district-free city Frankfurt (Oder), Poland, the districts Spree-Neiße and Dahme-Spreewald, and the Bundesland Berlin.

== Geography ==
The district is named after the two major rivers in the district - the Spree river forms a large bend within the district; the Oder river constitutes the eastern border.

== History ==
The district was created in 1993 by merging the districts Eisenhüttenstadt, Beeskow and Fürstenwalde, and the district-free city Eisenhüttenstadt.

== Demography ==
Development of Population since 1875 within the Current Boundaries (Blue Line: Population; Dotted Line: Comparison to Population Development of Brandenburg state)

Recent Population Development and Projections (Population Development before Census 2011 (blue line); Recent Population Development according to the Census in Germany in 2011 (blue bordered line); Official projections for 2005-2030 (yellow line); for 2014-2030 (red line); for 2017-2030 (scarlet line)

Landkreis Oder-Spree: Population development
within the current boundaries (2025)

Year	Pop.	±% p.a.
1875	87,934	—
1890	94,469	+0.48%
1910	115,555	+1.01%
1925	128,292	+0.70%
1933	141,635	+1.24%
1939	151,802	+1.16%
1946	158,490	+0.62%
1950	166,492	+1.24%
1964	183,110	+0.68%
1971	191,619	+0.65%

Year	Pop.	±% p.a.
1981	195,164	+0.18%
1985	194,810	−0.05%
1990	193,753	−0.11%
1995	190,839	−0.30%
2000	196,453	+0.58%
2005	190,728	−0.59%
2010	183,859	−0.73%
2015	182,397	−0.16%
2020	179,276	−0.34%
2025	179,142	−0.01%

== Coat of arms ==
District banner of Oder-Spree

The coat of arms shows symbols for the three former districts which make up the district. In the top left quarter is the coat of arms of the Bishops of Lebus, who had their seat in Fürstenwalde. The second quarter shows the checkered bar of the Cistercian Order as the symbol of the Abbey of Neuzelle, who until 1817 owned most of the territory which later became the district Eisenhüttenstadt. The two quarters in the bottom symbolize the former district Beeskow. The three knives in the left are the symbol of the Lords of Strehla, the deer antler the symbol of the Lords of Biberstein, who in 1317 succeeded the Lords of Strehla as the Lords of Beeskow and Storkow.

== Towns and municipalities ==
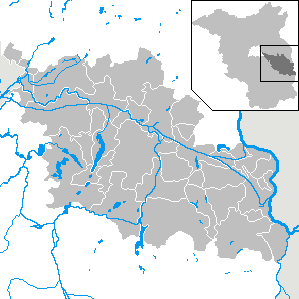
Clickable map of towns and municipalities in the district

The capital of the district is Beeskow, but Fürstenwalde is the biggest town, with a population of 31,000 people.

Amt-free towns	Ämter
1. Beeskow; 2. Eisenhüttenstadt; 3. Erkner; 4. Friedland; 5. Fürstenwalde; 6. Storkow; Amt-free municipalities: 1. Grünheide; 2. Rietz-Neuendorf; 3. Schöneiche; 4. Tauche; 5. Woltersdorf	1. Brieskow-Finkenheerd; 1. Brieskow-Finkenheerd^{1}; 2. Groß Lindow; 3. Vogelsang; 4. Wiesenau; 5. Ziltendorf; 2. Neuzelle; 1. Lawitz; 2. Neißemünde; 3. Neuzelle^{1}; 3. Odervorland; 1. Berkenbrück; 2. Briesen^{1}; 3. Jacobsdorf; 4. Steinhöfel	4. Scharmützelsee; 1. Bad Saarow^{1}; 2. Diensdorf-Radlow; 3. Langewahl; 4. Reichenwalde; 5. Wendisch Rietz; 5. Schlaubetal; 1. Grunow-Dammendorf; 2. Mixdorf; 3. Müllrose^{1, 2}; 4. Ragow-Merz; 5. Schlaubetal; 6. Siehdichum; 6. Spreenhagen; 1. Gosen-Neu Zittau; 2. Rauen; 3. Spreenhagen^{1}
^{1}seat of the Amt; ^{2}town

== See also ==
- Räuberberg (Görsdorf)
