= Bezirk Frankfurt =

District of East Germany

District of Frankfurt (Oder) Bezirk Frankfurt (Oder)
- District (Bezirk) of East Germany
- 1952–1990
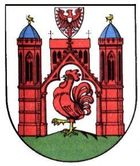
- Flag Coat of arms

- Location of Bezirk Frankfurt within the German Democratic Republic
- Capital: Frankfurt (Oder)
- Area
  - 1989: 7,186 km^{2} (2,775 sq mi)
- Population
  - 1989: 713,800
- Government
- First Secretary of the Socialist Unity Party
  - 1952–1958: Gerhard Grüneberg
  - 1958–1961: Eduard Götzl
  - 1961–1971: Erich Mückenberger
  - 1971–1988†: Hans-Joachim Hertwig
  - 1988–1989: Christa Zellmer
  - 1989–1990: Bernd Meier
- Chairman of the Council of the Bezirk
  - 1952–1956: Franz Peplinski
  - 1956–1960: Günter Springer
  - 1960–1963: Hans Albrecht
  - 1963–1969: Harry Mönch
  - 1969–1989: Siegfried Sommer
  - 1989–1990: Gundolf Baust
  - 1990: Britta Schellin (as Regierungsbevollmächtigter)
- Legislature: Bezirkstag Frankfurt (Oder)
- History
  - Established: 1952
  - Disestablished: 1990
Preceded by	Succeeded by
Brandenburg (1945-1952)	Brandenburg
- Today part of: Germany

The Bezirk Frankfurt, also Bezirk Frankfurt (Oder), was a district (Bezirk) of East Germany. The administrative seat and the main town was Frankfurt (Oder).

== History ==
The district was established, with the other 13, on 25 July 1952, substituting the old German states. It emerged from the province of Brandenburg.

After 3 October 1990 it was disestablished due to the German reunification, becoming again part of the state of Brandenburg.

== Geography ==
=== Position ===
The Bezirk Frankfurt was the district with the longest border with Poland to the east, extending 199 kilometres (124 mi). To the west, it bordered the district of Potsdam for 144 kilometres (89 mi) and East Berlin for 91 kilometres (57 mi). It also shared borders with Neubrandenburg and Cottbus.

=== Subdivisions ===
The Bezirk was divided into 12 Kreise: 3 urban districts (Stadtkreise) and 9 rural districts (Landkreise):

- Urban districts: Eisenhüttenstadt, Frankfurt (Oder), Schwedt.
- Rural districts: Angermünde; Bad Freienwalde; Beeskow; Bernau; Eberswalde; Eisenhüttenstadt-Land; Fürstenwalde; Seelow; Strausberg.
