= Rauen Hills =

Coordinates: 52°20′N 14°02′E

Rauensche Berge
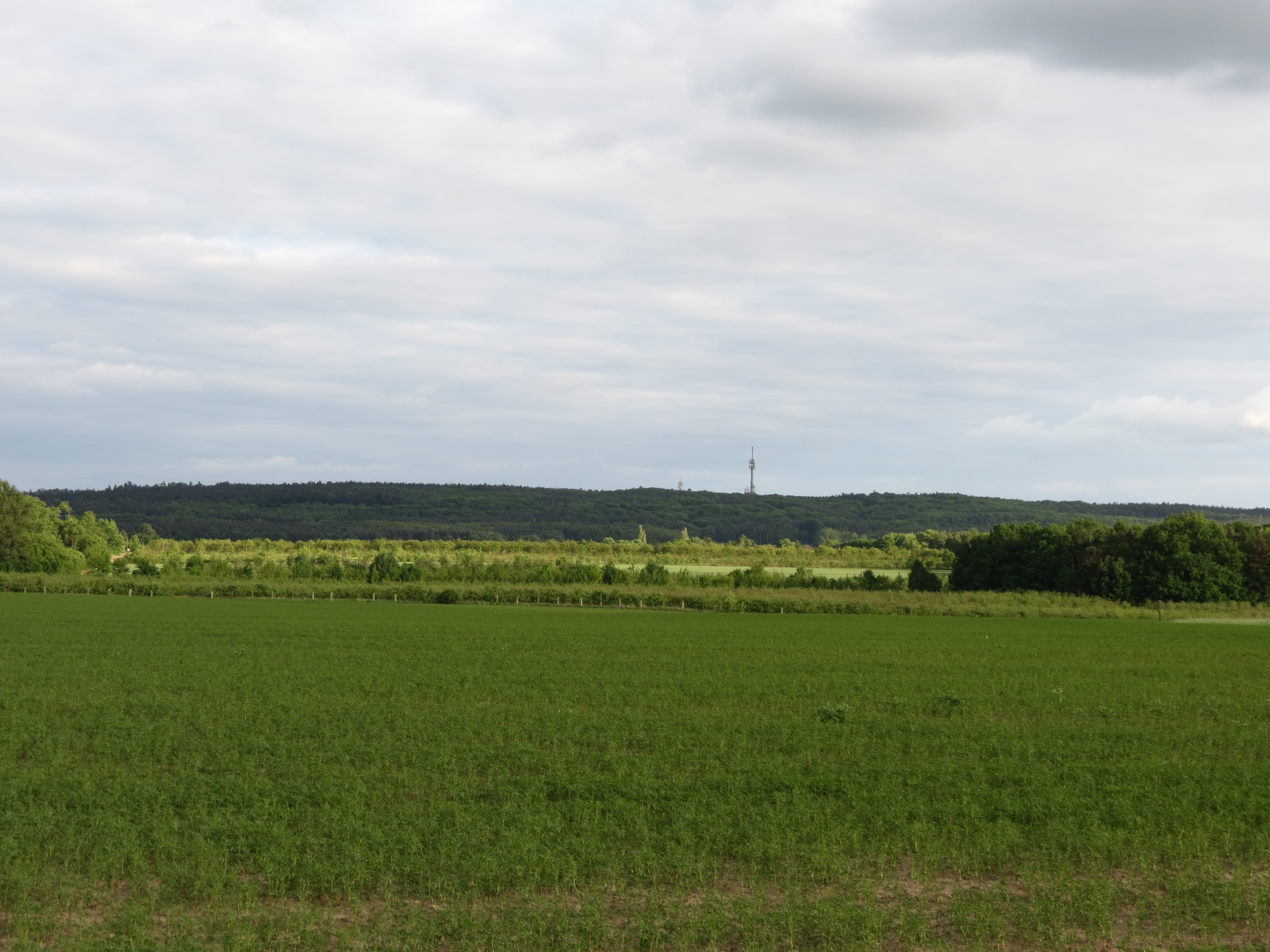
- Rauen Hills, view from the north.

Geography
- Location: Brandenburg, Germany

The Rauen Hills (German: Rauener Berge) are a range of low hills in Brandenburg, Germany. They are named after the town of Rauen.
