= Gosen-Neu Zittau =

- Municipality
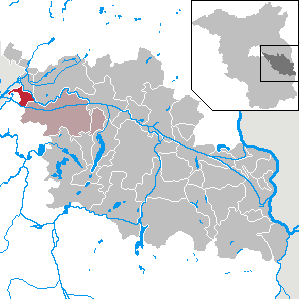
- Location of Gosen-Neu Zittau within Oder-Spree district
- Interactive map of Gosen-Neu Zittau
- Location within Germany Location within Brandenburg
- Coordinates: 52°23′36″N 13°42′46″E
- Country: Germany
- State: Brandenburg
- District: Oder-Spree
- Municipal assoc.: Spreenhagen
- Subdivisions: 4 districts

Government
  - Mayor (2024–29): Frank Nakoinz

Area
  - Total: 15.07 km^{2} (5.82 sq mi)
- Elevation: 37 m (121 ft)

Population (2025-12-31)
  - Total: 3,206
  - Density: 212.7/km^{2} (551.0/sq mi)
- Time zone: UTC+01:00 (CET)
  - Summer (DST): UTC+02:00 (CEST)
- Postal codes: 15537
- Dialling codes: 03362
- Vehicle registration: LOS
- Website: www.amt-spreenhagen.de

Gosen-Neu Zittau is a municipality in the Oder-Spree district, in Brandenburg, Germany. Neu Zittau is situated in the Spree valley, near the Oder-Spree-Canal.

== Geography ==
=== Neighbouring places ===
- Erkner
- Königs Wusterhausen
- Spreenhagen
- Berlin

=== Divisions of the town ===
- Gosen
- Neu Zittau
- Burig
- Steinfurt

== Demography ==
Development of population since 1875 within the current boundaries (Blue line: Population; Dotted line: Comparison to population development of Brandenburg state; Grey background: Time of Nazi rule; Red background: Time of communist rule)

Gosen-Neu Zittau: Population development
within the current boundaries (2013)

Year	Pop.	±% p.a.
1875	1,672	—
1890	1,573	−0.41%
1910	2,109	+1.48%
1925	2,279	+0.52%
1933	2,667	+1.98%
1939	2,851	+1.12%
1946	3,074	+1.08%
1950	2,873	−1.68%
1964	2,522	−0.93%
1971	2,536	+0.08%
1981	2,311	−0.92%
1985	2,203	−1.19%
1989	2,192	−0.13%
1990	2,123	−3.15%
1991	2,100	−1.08%
1992	2,133	+1.57%
1993	2,093	−1.88%
1994	2,095	+0.10%
1995	2,106	+0.53%
1996	2,217	+5.27%

Year	Pop.	±% p.a.
1997	2,366	+6.72%
1998	2,480	+4.82%
1999	2,502	+0.89%
2000	2,455	−1.88%
2001	2,543	+3.58%
2002	2,634	+3.58%
2003	2,688	+2.05%
2004	2,726	+1.41%
2005	2,731	+0.18%
2006	2,764	+1.21%
2007	2,797	+1.19%
2008	2,880	+2.97%
2009	2,888	+0.28%
2010	2,900	+0.42%
2011	3,020	+4.14%
2012	2,991	−0.96%
2013	3,002	+0.37%
2014	2,970	−1.07%
2015	3,055	+2.86%
2016	3,072	+0.56%
