= Heinz Sokolowski =

East German political prisoner

- Born: 17 December 1917; Frankfurt an der Oder, German Empire
- Died: 25 November 1965 (aged 47); East Berlin, East Germany
- Cause of death: Shot by a guard whilst attempting to leave
- Body discovered: Border by Clara-Zetkin-Straße (now Dorotheenstraße); 52.5176°N 13.3767°E
- Monuments: White Crosses, Berlin
- Known for: Being shot while escaping from East Berlin

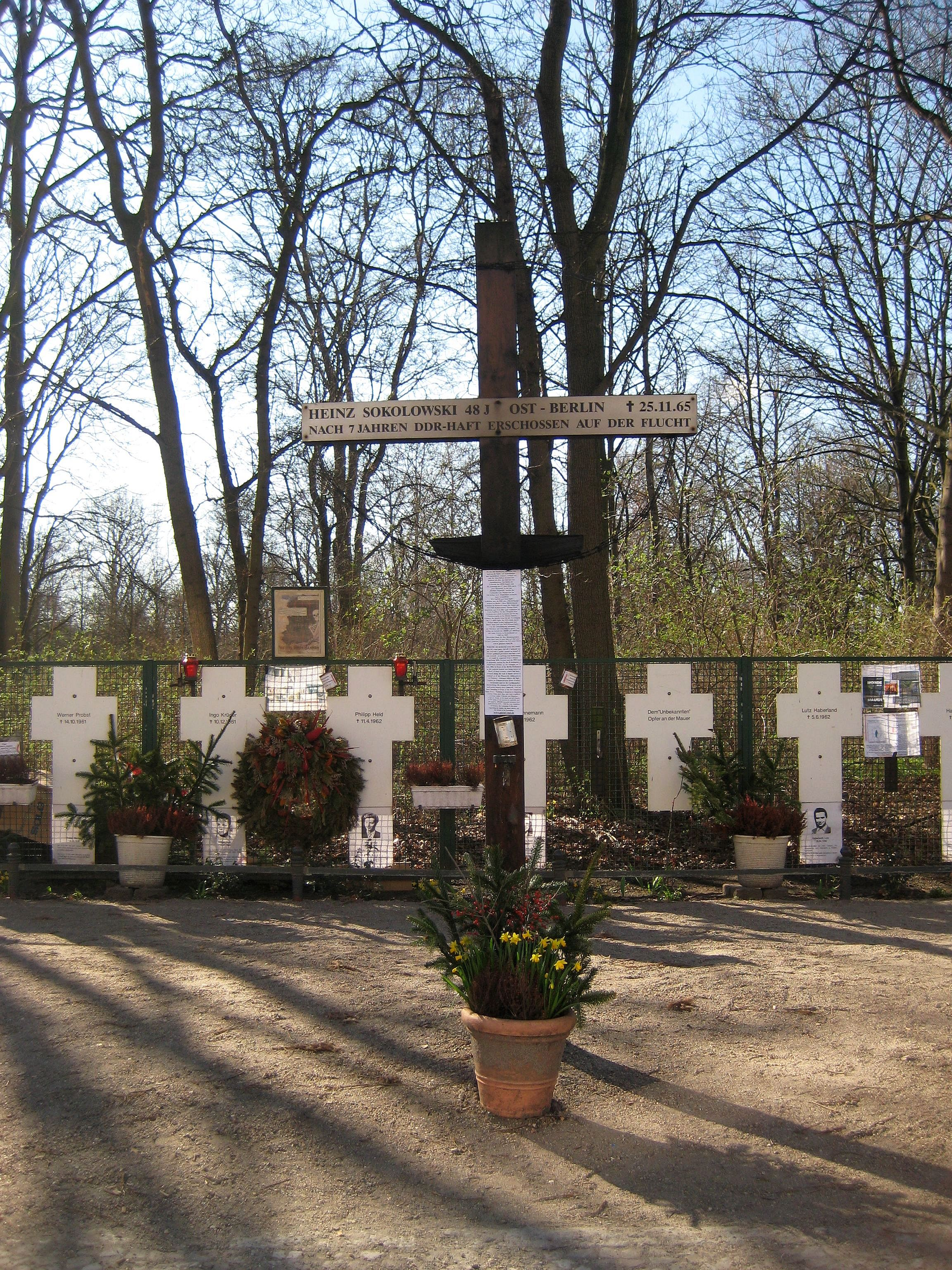
Memorial to Heinz Sokolowski

Heinz Sokolowski (17 December 1917 – 25 November 1965) was a German man who became the sixty-fourth known person to die at the Berlin Wall. Sokolowski, a former political prisoner, was shot and killed by East German border troops while attempting to cross the Berlin Wall near to the Brandenburg Gate and the Reichstag building.

== Life ==
Heinz Sokolowski was born on 17 December 1917, in Frankfurt an der Oder, Imperial Germany, during the First World War. Following primary school, he apprenticed as a tailor before attending a trade school where he completed his education, eventually becoming a journalist with the Frankfurt Oder Zeitung. During World War II, Sokolowski was drafted into the Wehrmacht, fighting in various places and was also used as a war correspondent, before being captured by the Red Army in Russia during the German invasion of the Soviet Union. Sokolowski became a prisoner of war under custody of the Soviet Union, and supposedly became a communist while participating in a working group.

In 1946, shortly after the war ended, Sokolowski was released from Soviet captivity in 1946 and moved into the Soviet sector of Berlin, where he worked as a freelance journalist. The following year, he married and moved to Prenzlauer Berg with his wife and newborn daughter. The marriage lasted until 1951, and he worked for the Soviets until his arrest on 12 February 1953. A military tribunal found Sokolowski guilty on charges of espionage, and sentenced him at first to twenty years, then to ten years, imprisonment in a labor camp in the Soviet Union. A few years later, the Soviets handed him over to the custody of the German Democratic Republic (East Germany) in 1956, during which he contracted tuberculosis. He was released from prison on 13 February 1963.

== Death ==
Following his release, Sokolowski worked as an elevator operator in East Berlin, while also having applied to leave East Germany, but was not approved for emigration. He made contacts in West Berlin in 1964, bringing him to the attention of the Stasi. After his dismissal as an elevator operator in May 1965, Sokolowski quickly began to plan his escape, which began at 5 AM on 25 November 1965. That morning, Sokolowski neared the border by Clara-Zetkin-Straße (now Dorotheenstraße) close to the Brandenburg Gate and the Reichstag building when an East German border guard saw him and fired a warning shot, but he failed to respond. Other guards opened fire on Sokolowski, who had by this time reached the last wall topped with barbed wire. Sokolowski was shot in the abdomen and died of his injuries on the way to the hospital.

== Memorial ==
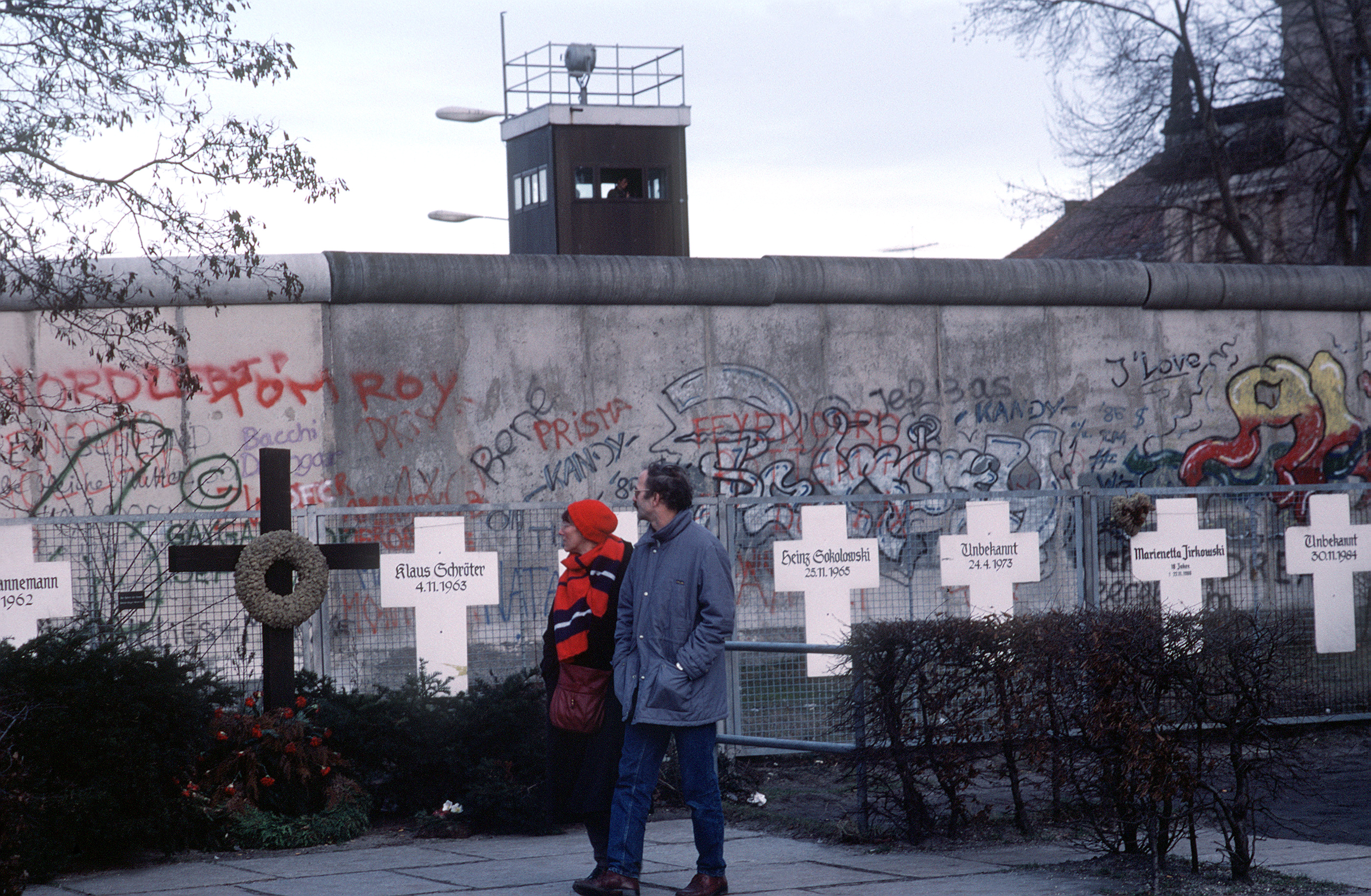
The original Sokolowski White Cross

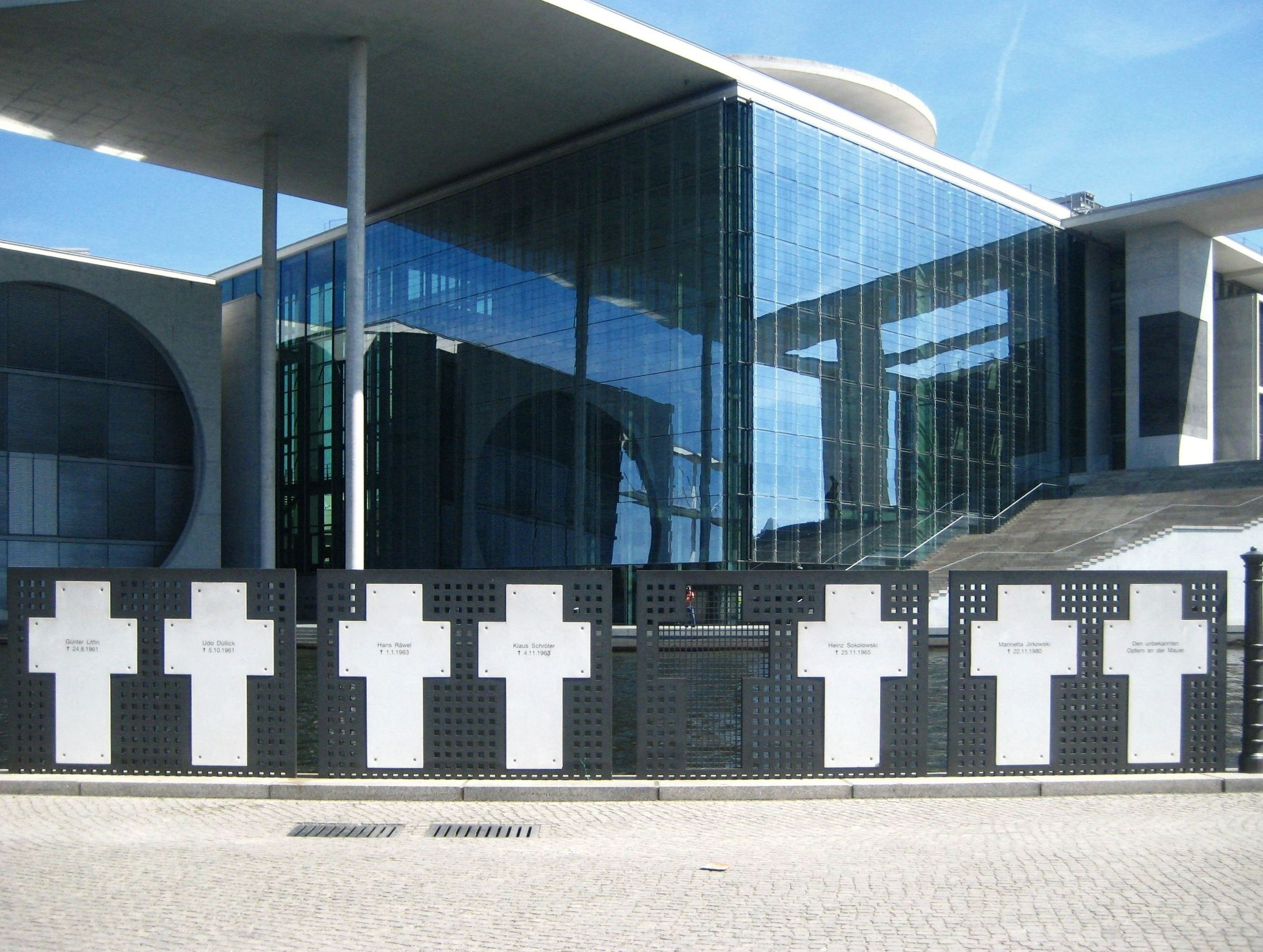
The new Sokolowski White Cross

A three-meter-high cross was erected at the corner of Ebertstraße and Scheidemannstraße on 13 August 1966 in memory of Heinz Sokolowski. Inscribed upon this cross are his dates of birth and death and the legend "Nach 7 Jahren DDR-Haft erschossen auf der Flucht". Sokolowski is also remembered with a White Cross on the Reichstagufer.

== See also ==
- List of deaths at the Berlin Wall
- Berlin Crisis of 1961

== Literature ==
- Hans-Hermann Hertle, Maria Nooke: Die Todesopfer an der Berliner Mauer 1961 - 1989 : ein biographisches Handbuch / hrsg. vom Zentrum für Zeithistorische Forschung Potsdam und der Stiftung Berliner Mauer. Links, Berlin 2009, ISBN 978-3-86153-517-1.
