= Spreenhagen (Amt) =

- Amt
- Map of Oder-Spree highlighting Spreenhagen
- Interactive map of Spreenhagen
- Location within Germany Location within Brandenburg
- Coordinates: 52°21′N 13°52′E
- Country: Germany
- State: Brandenburg
- District: Oder-Spree
- Seat: Spreenhagen
- Subdivisions: 3 municipalities

Area
  - Total: 173.88 km^{2} (67.14 sq mi)

Population (2025-12-31)
  - Total: 8,585
  - Density: 49.37/km^{2} (127.9/sq mi)
- Time zone: UTC+01:00 (CET)
  - Summer (DST): UTC+02:00 (CEST)
- Website: www.amt-spreenhagen.de

Amt Spreenhagen is an Amt ("collective municipality") in the district of Oder-Spree, in Brandenburg, Germany. Its seat is in Spreenhagen.

The Amt Spreenhagen consists of the following municipalities:

1. Gosen-Neu Zittau
2. Rauen
3. Spreenhagen

== Demography ==
Development of population since 1875 within the current Boundaries (Blue Line: Population; Dotted Line: Comparison to Population development in Brandenburg state; Grey Background: Time of Nazi Germany; Red Background: Time of communist East Germany)

Recent Population Development and Projections (Population Development before Census 2011 (blue line); Recent Population Development according to the Census in Germany in 2011 (blue bordered line); Official projections for 2005-2030 (yellow line); for 2017-2030 (scarlet line); for 2020-2030 (green line)

Amt Spreenhagen: Population development
within the current boundaries (2020)

Year	Pop.	±% p.a.
1875	5,898	—
1890	5,807	−0.10%
1910	6,995	+0.94%
1925	7,168	+0.16%
1939	8,995	+1.63%
1950	8,518	−0.49%
1964	7,365	−1.03%
1971	7,397	+0.06%
1981	7,063	−0.46%

Year	Pop.	±% p.a.
1985	6,871	−0.69%
1990	6,732	−0.41%
1995	6,922	+0.56%
2000	7,785	+2.38%
2005	8,152	+0.93%
2010	8,289	+0.33%
2015	8,263	−0.06%
2020	8,803	+1.27%
2025	8,585	−0.50%
