= Udo Düllick =

One of the first man to die at the Berlin Wall

Udo Düllick (3 August 1936 – 5 October 1961) was an East German railway worker who was seventh known person to die at the Berlin Wall. Düllick drowned while crossing the Spree river, between Friedrichshain and Kreuzberg near the Oberbaumbrücke, less than two months after the erection of the Berlin Wall.

== Early life ==
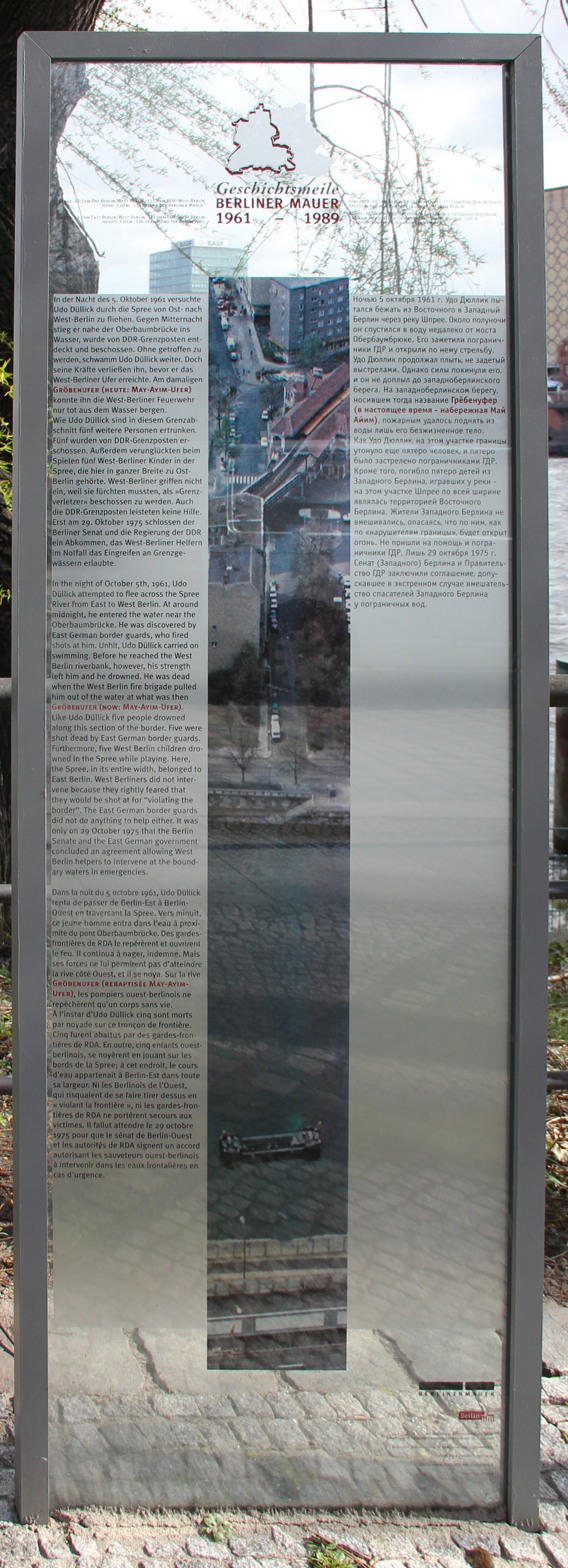
Memorial plate May-Ayim-Ufer (Kreuzberg) Udo Düllick

Udo Düllick was born on 3 August 1936 in Dresden, into a Catholic family, and raised with his older brother in the village of Werder, near Strausberg east of Berlin. Düllick studied engineering in Dresden and found employment at the Deutsche Reichsbahn, the state-owned railways of East Germany. His brother went to West Germany in 1959. His father remarried after the death of their mother.

In August 1961, the Berlin Wall had been erected by the East German government, which had significantly restricted migration from East Germany to West Berlin.

== Death ==
On the evening of 5 October 1961, Düllick attended a company party of the Reichsbahn. There, he got into an argument with a supervisor, resulting in him tearing off the shoulder marks of his Reichsbahn uniform and then being fired on the spot. At around midnight, Düllick took a taxi northward to the Osthafen (East Port) in the Friedrichshain area of East Berlin, and jumped into the water. The Border Troops fired warning shots at Düllick while he was swimming across the River Spree towards West Berlin. Finally, they shot deliberately at Düllick, who subsequently drowned despite not getting hit by the gunfire. People from West Berlin witnessed the event, but they had to stay on the wharf because the Spree fully belonged to the territory of East Germany. The West Berlin fire department recovered his corpse, whose name was unknown at that moment. The following day, 2,500 people from West Berlin gathered at Gröbenufer for a funeral. Düllick's brother, who was living in the West, soon identified his corpse and a funeral service was held on 18 October 1961 at the Jerusalem Cemetery in Berlin-Kreuzberg. Gröbenufer today has a memorial stone, which was erected the same year. A cross of the memorial White Crosses on Reichstagufer commemorates Udo Düllick.

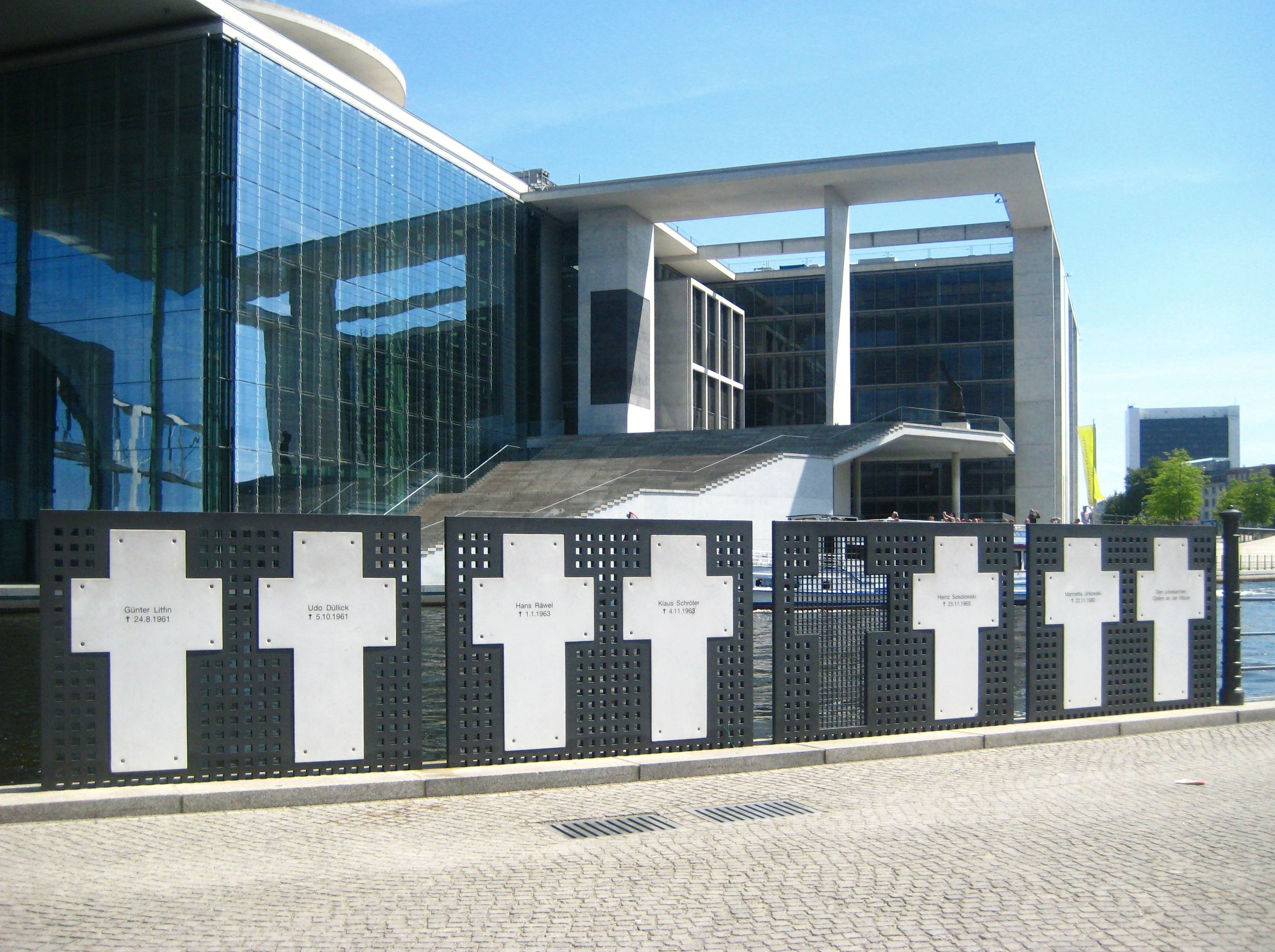
Berlin, Spreeufer, Memorial crosses for the victims of the wall

== See also ==
- List of deaths at the Berlin Wall
- Berlin Crisis of 1961

== Literature ==
- Christine Brecht: Udo Düllick , in: Die Toten an der Berliner Mauer. Ein biographisches Handbuch 1961–1989 , Links, Berlin 2009, ISBN 978-3-86153-517-1, pp 51–53.

== Links ==
- Short portrait on www.chronik-der-mauer.de
