= White Crosses =

Monument and memorial in Berlin

Coordinates: 52°31′11″N 13°22′37″E

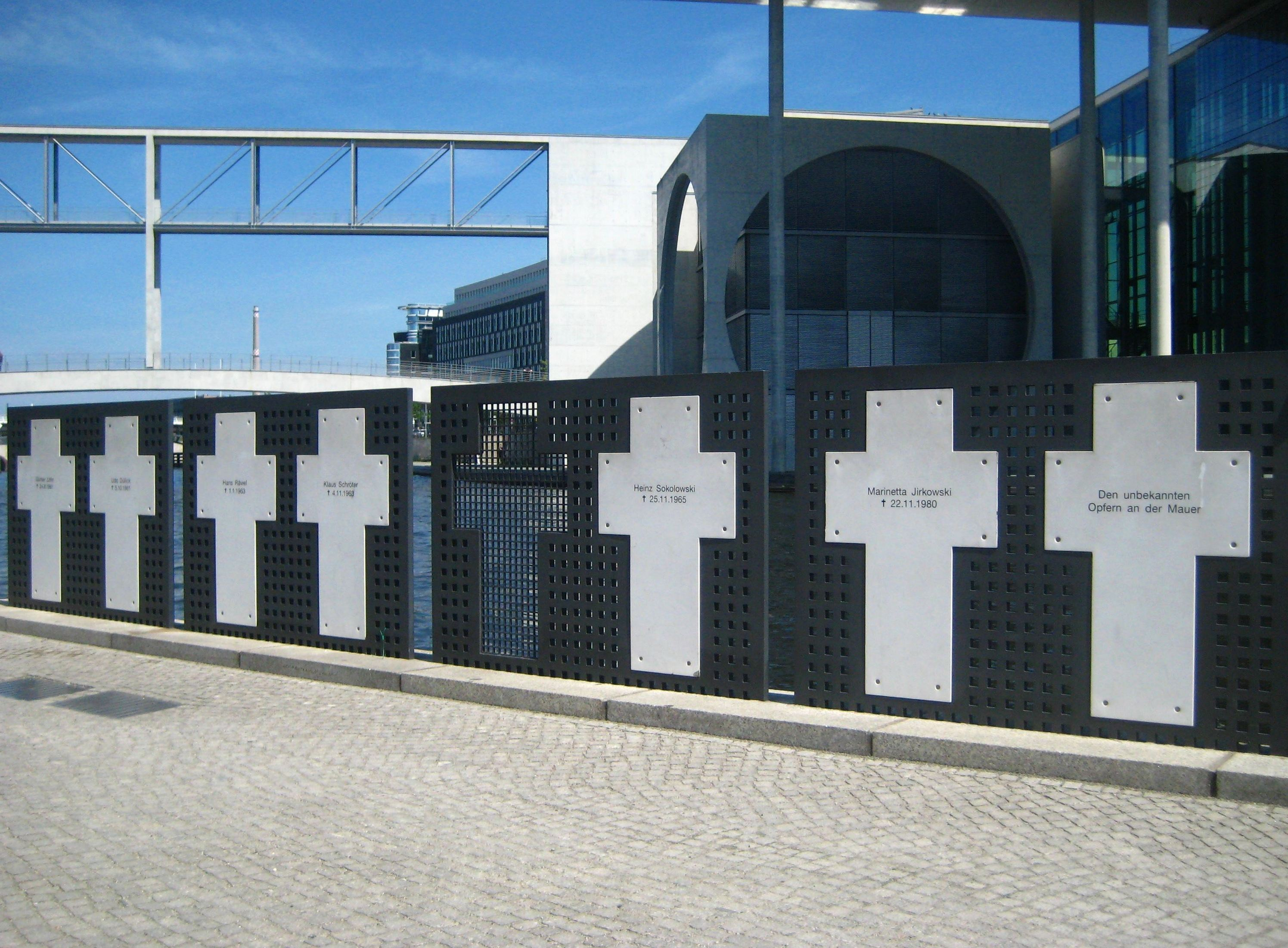
The "White Crosses"

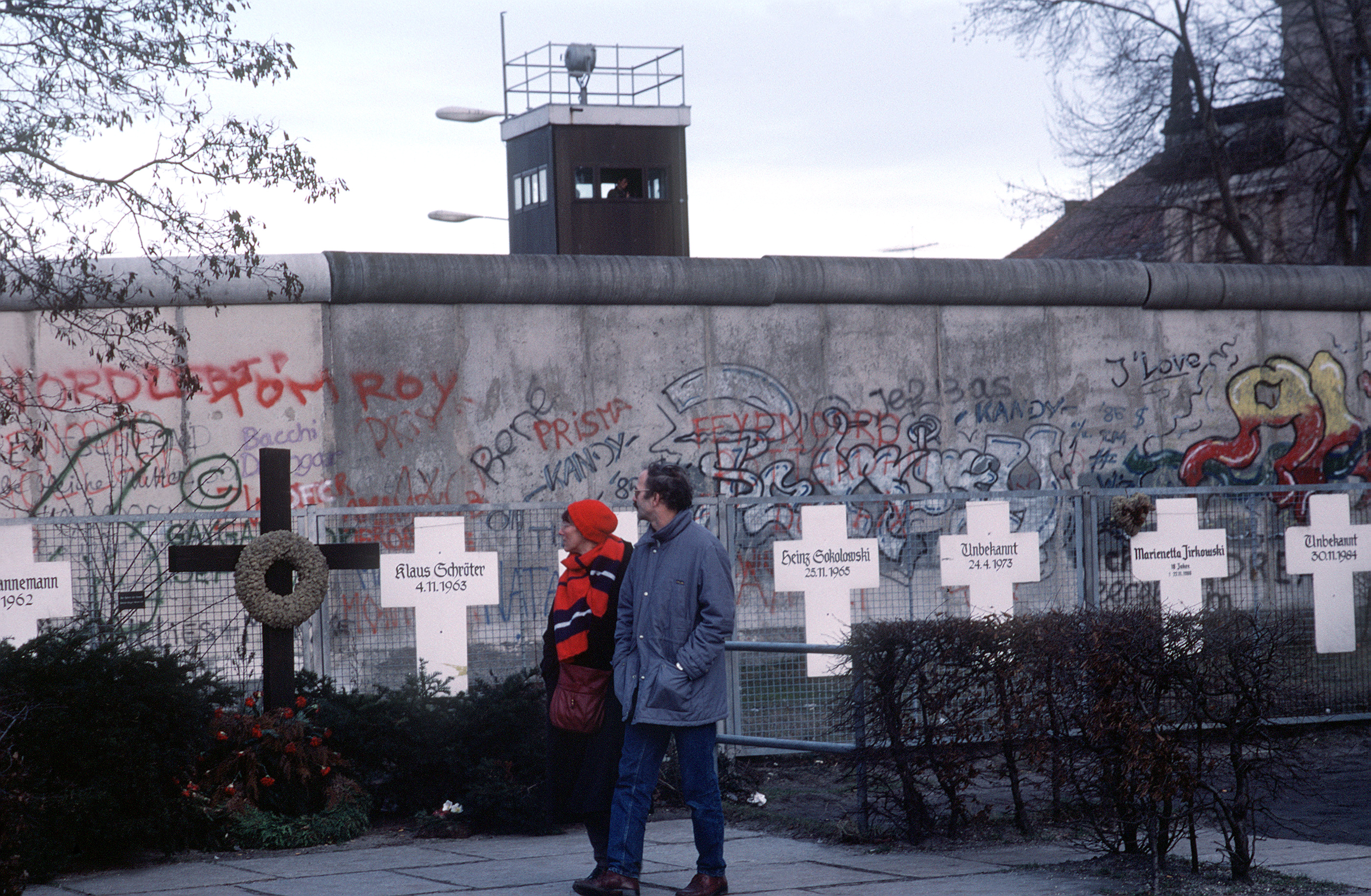
The original memorial with Berlin Wall in the background, 1990

White Crosses (in German: Weiße Kreuze) is a memorial for those who died during the Cold War at the Berlin Wall. It is located at the shore of the river Spree in Berlin next to the Reichstag building, which houses the German parliament. Established by the private group Berliner Bürger-Verein on the 10th anniversary of the Berlin Wall in 1971 it was first located east of the Reichstag on a fence directly in front of the wall. After the German reunification in 1990 it kept its location until construction of the new government buildings next to the Reichstag was started at the end of that century – Berlin was chosen to be the new capital of Germany.

During construction the memorial was moved to a location south of the Reichstag next to the Tiergarten. On the 50th anniversary of the Uprising of 1953 in East Germany a second set of crosses was erected on the riverbank, which is slightly north-west of the original location. The opening speech was given by then President of the Bundestag Wolfgang Thierse.

== Victims' names ==
The names of 13 victims are inscribed on both sides of the 7 crosses. One cross is devoted to the unknown victims of the wall. The selection contains the first and last victim who were killed by gunfire. Most of the victims died between 1961 and 1965.

landside

- Günter Litfin, 24 August 1961
- Udo Düllick, 5 October 1961
- Hans Räwel, 1 January 1963
- Klaus Schröter, 4 November 1963
- Heinz Sokolowski, 25 November 1965
- Marienetta Jirkowsky, 22 November 1980
- "den unbekannten Opfern an der Mauer" (German: to the unknown victims of the wall)

riverside

- Werner Probst, 14 October 1961
- Ingo Krüger, 10 December 1961
- Philipp Held, 11 April 1962
- Axel Hannemann, 5 June 1962
- Lutz Haberlandt, 27 June 1962
- Wolf-Olaf Muszinski, March 1963
- Chris Gueffroy, 5 February 1989
