= Marienetta Jirkowsky =

East German woman who died at the Berlin Wall

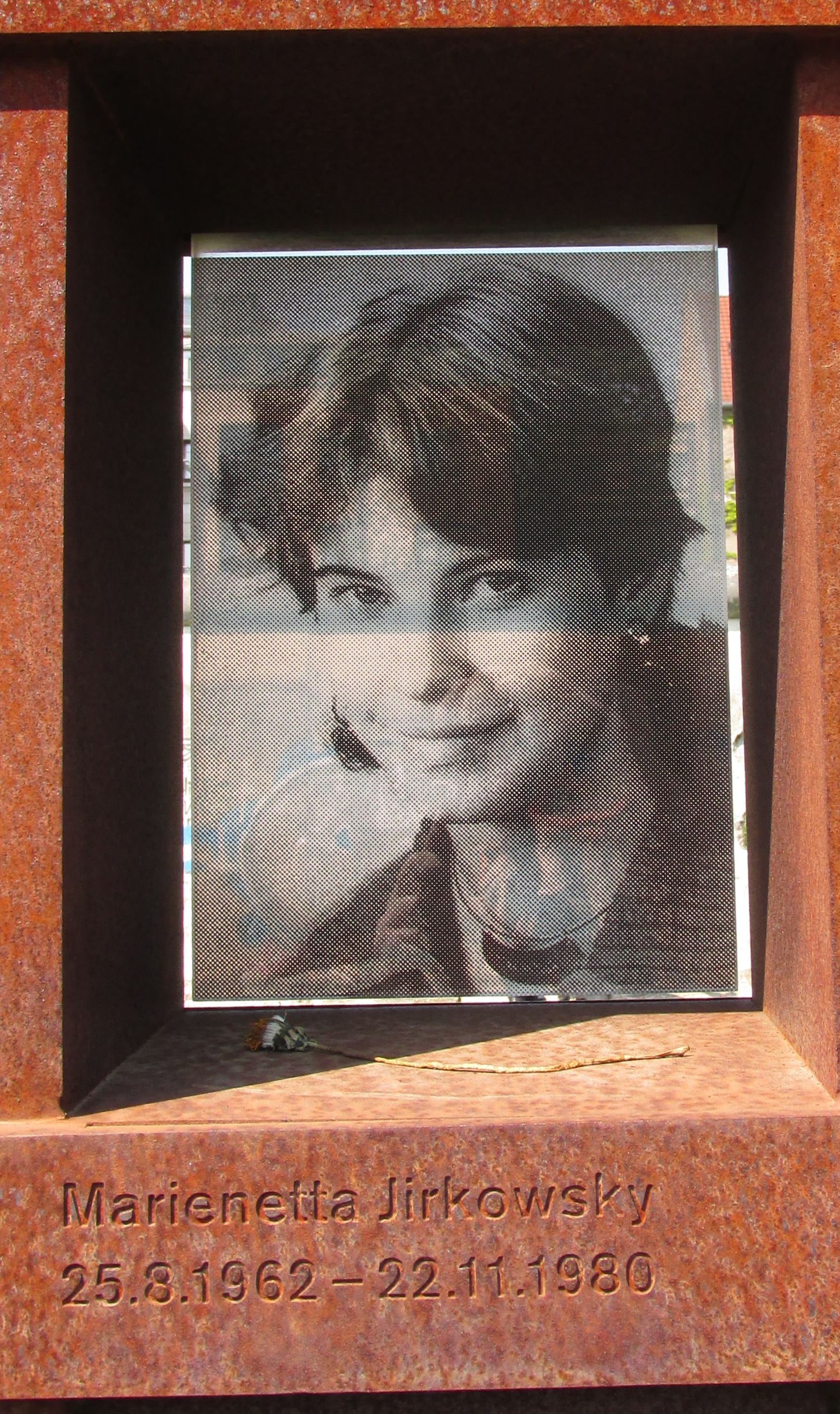
- Jirkowsky, at the Window of Remembrance, Berlin Wall Memorial, Bernauer Straße.
- Born: 25 August 1962; Bad Saarow, East Germany
- Died: 22 November 1980 (aged 18); Hennigsdorf, East Germany
- Cause of death: Shot by a guard whilst attempting to enter West Berlin from Hohen Neuendorf, which was in the former GDR
- Body discovered: Vacant property on Florastrasse; 52.6605°N 13.2846°E
- Resting place: Spreenhagen Cemetery, Spreenhagen
- Monuments: White Crosses, Berlin "Window Of Remembrance", Berlin "Marienetta Jirkowsky Monument", Hohen Neuendorf
- Known for: Youngest of 8 women killed at the Berlin Wall

Marienetta "Micki" Jirkowsky (25 August 1962 – 22 November 1980) was a German woman who became the one-hundred and twenty-fifth known person to die at the Berlin Wall. Jirkowsky was shot and killed by East German border guards during an escape attempt, and at 18 years was one of the youngest victims and the youngest of the 8 women killed at the Berlin wall.

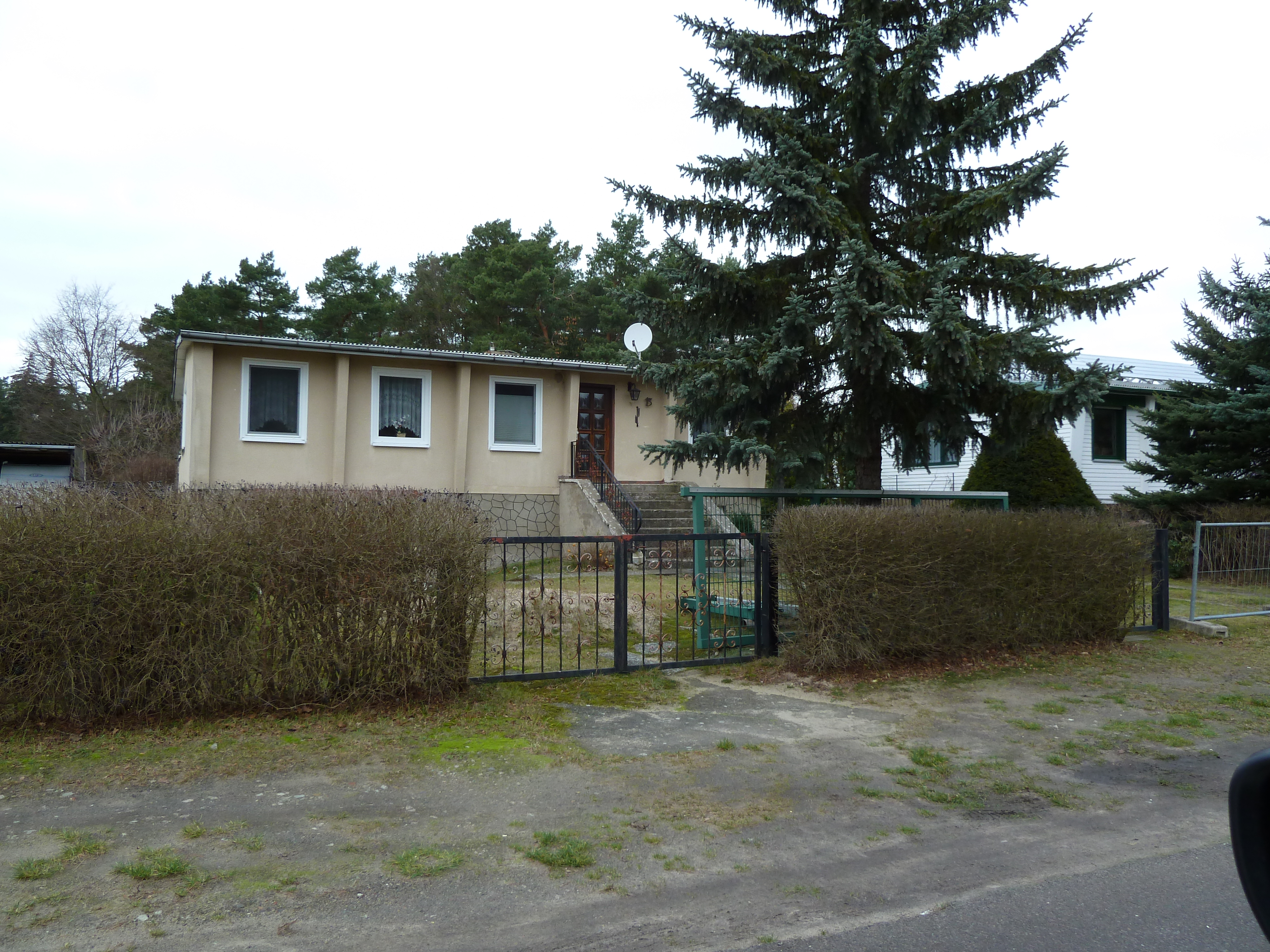
Marienetta Jirkowsky's last residence prior to her death in 1980, on Birkenweg 13, Spreenhagen

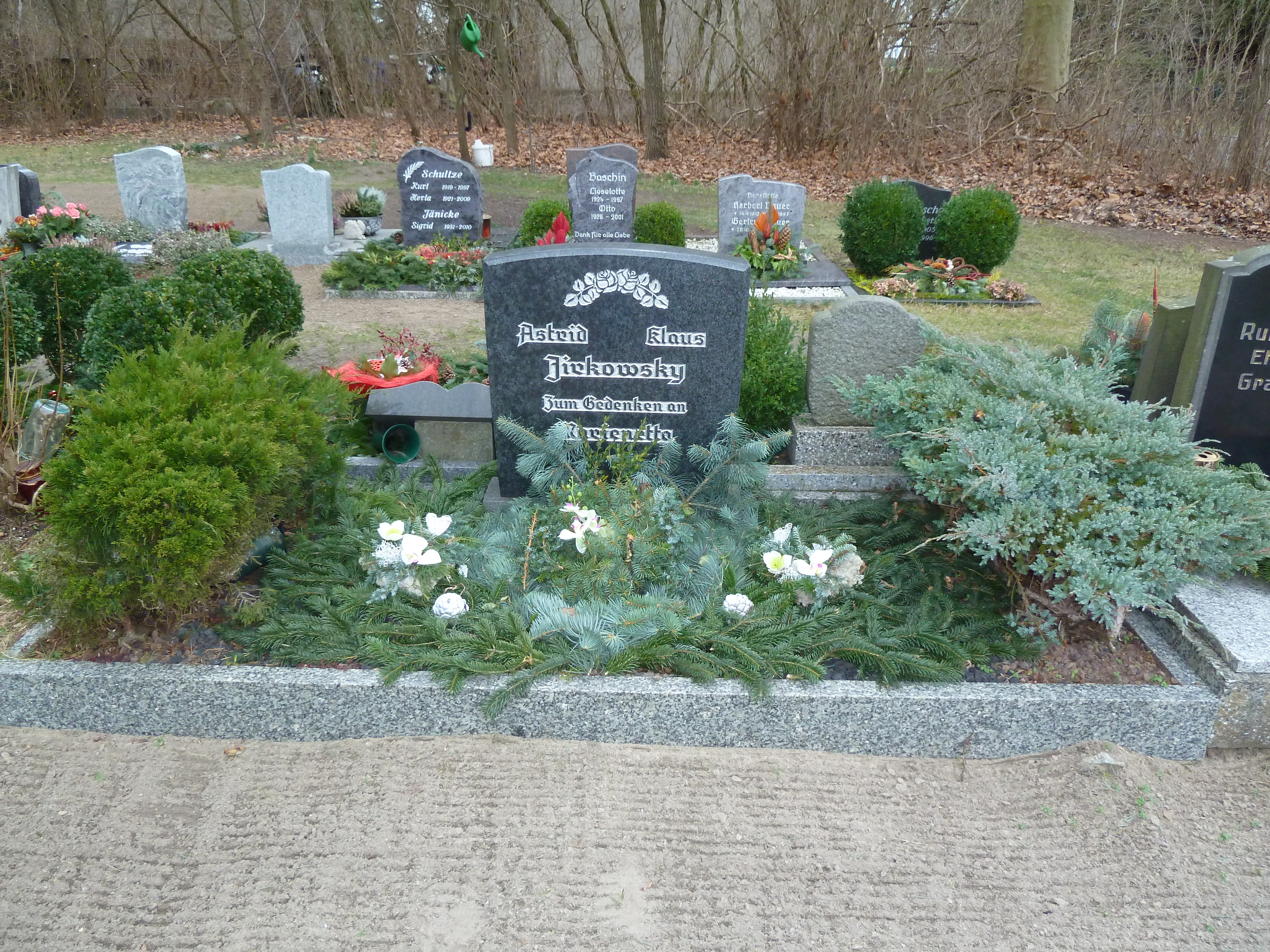
The family grave of Marienetta Jirkowsky, Spreenhagen Cemetery

== Biography ==
Marienetta Jirkowsky was born on 25 August 1962, in Bad Saarow, East Germany, the only child to Klaus Jirkowsky, a skilled bricklayer, and his wife, Astrid, employed by the Reifenkombinat Fürstenwalde, a tyre manufacturing plant. Marienetta grew up in Spreenhagen and last lived at Birkenweg 13, where she was nicknamed "Micki" by her friends, as she was a "small, free-spirited and fun-loving person." One of her friends, Falko Vogt, later explained she and her friends really "just wanted to live in peace, without any problems and without being forbidden to do anything." During the school year, Marienetta had little contact with other students. Instead, during her spare time, she helped in a retirement home in the neighboring village of Grünheide, where she was very popular with senior citizens. In 1979, Marienetta began her apprenticeship as a textile worker at the tyre factory where her mother worked.

Falko Vogt had been thinking about escaping East Germany for a long time, and when he and Marienetta met Peter Wiesner together in spring 1980, discovered that Wiesner also disliked the conditions in the country. Wiesner applied a number of times for an exit permit to leave East Germany. When Marienetta turned 18, the legal age of an adult under East German law, she became engaged to Peter Wiesner and they planned to move in together in the fall of 1980. However, this decision led to major conflicts with Marienetta's parents who were opposed to the relationship, fearing that they were going to lose their only child, particularly if she emigrated with Wiesner. Additionally, Wiesner was divorced, drank a lot, was violence prone, struggled to maintain consistent employment, and had a history of being in trouble with the police. To end the relationship, Marienetta's parents succeeded in getting a police order to ban Wiesner from having any contact with their daughter. After that, the three young people were just waiting for the right moment to leave East Germany, and planned to flee together on the night of 22 November 1980. In preparation for their escape, Peter Wiesner created a folding ladder in his apartment, which consisted of separate pieces. Numerous newspaper and magazine articles indicated that by this time, Marienetta Jirkowsky was three months pregnant. However, this has not been confirmed by something more reliable, such as an autopsy record from the hospital in Hennigsdorf, or a police report.

== Death ==
On 21 November 1980, Marienetta, Vogt, and Wiesner took a train from Fürstenwalde to East Berlin to look for a good place to escape. They agreed that the spot they previously checked out was not suited for an escape, so they took the S-Bahn back to Hohen Neuendorf that evening. Peter Wiesner was familiar with the border there, from when he worked nearby as a showman. They arrived at the Hohen Neuendorf S-Bahn station at around 12:30 AM, and worked their way across the property near the border. Contrary to their original plan, the three made a spontaneous decision to flee that very night. They did not know that, thanks to this decision, Vogt and Wiesner just barely missed being arrested early the next morning. An informant for the East German secret police, the Stasi, was a member of their group of friends, and betrayed them by reporting their escape plan. Since the fabricated ladder was still in Wiesner's residence, they stole two ladders en route, including a ladder from the yard of a disused restaurant, and a folding stepladder from a neighbouring residence at Florastrasse 2, which was approximately 150 meters from where they attempted their escape.

Once in position at the Berlin Wall, they used the stepladder to peer over the inner wall and get a look at the border grounds. For three hours that night, the three young people observed the routine at the border while bolstering each other's courage. Then they separated the stepladder into two parts, and at about 3:30 AM, they used the front part of the stepladder to climb over the inner wall. The larger restaurant ladder was used to get over the next obstacle, a 2.5 meter high signal fence, which the two men overcame without activating the alarm, but when Marienetta followed them, the alarm was triggered. The men had already reached the final obstacle, the 3.5-meter-high outer wall on the border with West Berlin, where the bottom part of the stepladder would be used to scale the outer wall. Although part of the step ladder had sunk into the ground, Vogt and Wiesner were still able to reach the top of the wall, but then shots were fired at them by East German border guards from a watchtower located 160 meters away. Vogt had already jumped down to the West Berlin side, but Wiesner lay down on his stomach on top of the wall because Marienetta, who was standing on the top rung of the ladder, was too short to grasp the wall with her hands. Wiesner reached out his hand to her to pull her up. Two additional border guards, who had run from their watchtower 230 meters away, also started firing at the fugitives. Marienetta had already reached the top of the wall with her hands when she was struck by a bullet, said "Autsch!" and fell off the ladder, while Wiesner fell down on the West Berlin side. A short time later the border guards retrieved Marienetta and provided first aid, then the regiment doctor ordered her to be transported to the nearest hospital in Hennigsdorf, where an emergency operation was performed. Marienetta Jirkowsky died at the hospital at 11:30 AM from a gunshot wound through her abdomen.

On the day of the fatal escape attempt, Marienetta Jirkowsky's father was summoned to the East German police in Fürstenwalde. At first all he learned there was that his daughter had been arrested at the border to West Berlin, and was not informed that she had been killed, until two days later. The family was not allowed to publish an obituary. Spreenhagen, the 18-year-old woman's hometown, was virtually sealed off by Stasi agents when the urn containing her ashes was buried in the town's cemetery. The funeral was attended by her immediate family on 14 December 1980.

== Aftermath ==
On behalf of all the Allied city commanders, the French city commander protested that very day against Marienetta Jirkowsky's shooting and demanded that East Germany finally put a stop to their "inhuman practices" regarding escapees.

The East German secret police went to great effort to prevent any information from 18 year old Jirkowsky's death from leaking out. Under no circumstances was a photograph of the dead woman to be published and many photographs of Marienetta were confiscated from her friends and relatives. The East German secret police tried to make Peter Wiesner and Falko Vogt look like liars by passing a photograph of a woman who resembled Marienetta Jirkowsky on to the western media. The plan was to undermine the validity of all the reporting on the fatal escape attempt by having this photo identified as "false." Another step was taken to publicly discredit the two men who had fled: Informants working for the East German secret police were supposed to win over their confidence and then try to make them look like criminals. They were to "inconspicuously encourage them to spend large sums of money without deliberation, take out credit, etc., in order to set the preconditions for possible criminal behavior." Despite these measures, Falko Vogt and Peter Wiesner were able to provide detailed accounts of the case to the authorities of West Berlin. In early February 1981, they placed a cross at the site where they had escaped to honor Jirkowsky. It was removed by a Stasi informant, Gero Hilliger (IMB Brunnen), and secretly brought to the Stasi in East Berlin. The Stasi also considered extraditing Vogt and Wiesner by taking "measures to transfer the two men back to East Germany," specifically meaning a plan to have them kidnapped and brought back to East Germany against their will.

In the aftermath of Marienetta Jirkowsky's death, Falko Vogt became involved in spectacular acts to draw attention to the fate of his friend. On 6 February 1981, he placed charges of murder against the East German minister of defense, Heinz Hoffmann, with the Central Registry Office in Salzgitter. On 2 March 1981, during the Organization for Security and Co-operation in Europe follow-up conference in Madrid, he chained himself to the entrance gate of the Soviet embassy to denounce the East German government's violation of human rights.

Fifteen years later, one of the border guards that shot at Vogt, Wiesner, and Jirkowsky was tried for a "less serious case of manslaughter" and sentenced as a youth by the Neuruppin district court to a prison term of one year and three months, which was commuted to probation.

In 2009, Hohen Neuendorf city council introduced legislation to rename a traffic circle connected to Florastrasse to commemorate Marienetta Jirkowsky, but was vehemently rejected by her aunt and mother's sister, Bärbel Kultus. She attempted to act as the spokesperson for the family, since both of Jirkowsky's parents had since died, insisting that there was no merit to have died at the Berlin Wall, and that mourning was a private family matter. Kultus was revealed to have been a high level Stasi informant since 1970 until the dissolution of East Germany, under the codename "GMS Bärbel". Despite her opposition, after months of struggle, the decision was ultimately approved by the Hohen Neuendorf city council on 13 August 2010 and the traffic circle was renamed "Marienetta-Jirkowsky-Platz".

== Memorials ==
Memorials to her death are located in the "White Crosses" memorial, next to the Reichstag building, in the "Window Of Remembrance" of the Berlin Wall Memorial in Berlin and near the former scene of the attempted escape, in Hohen Neuendorf.

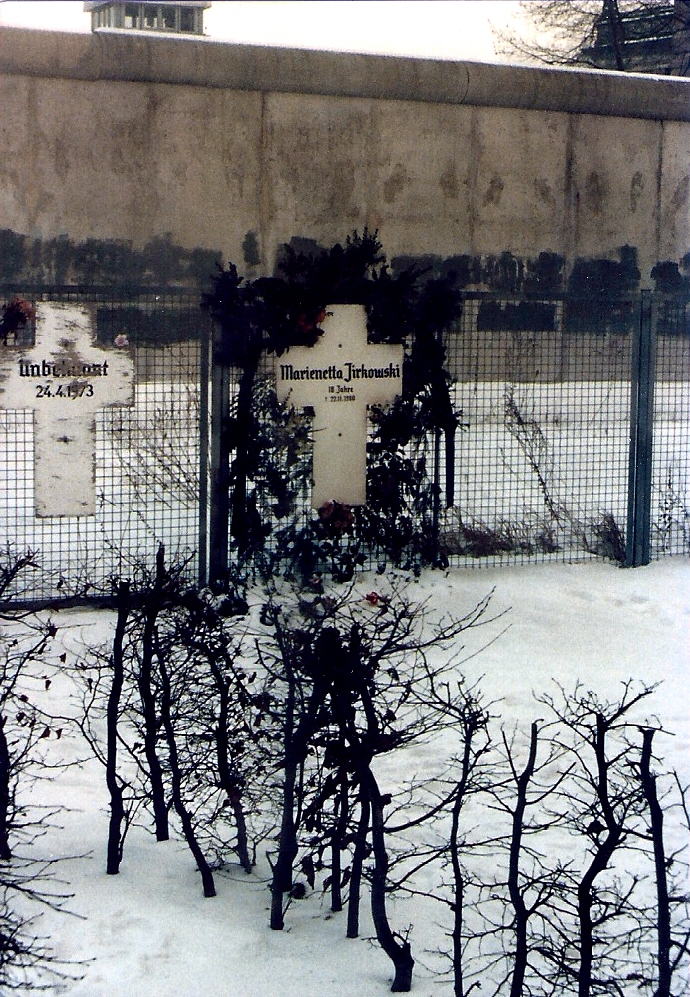
Original Cross Location taken in 1985, at Berlin Wall

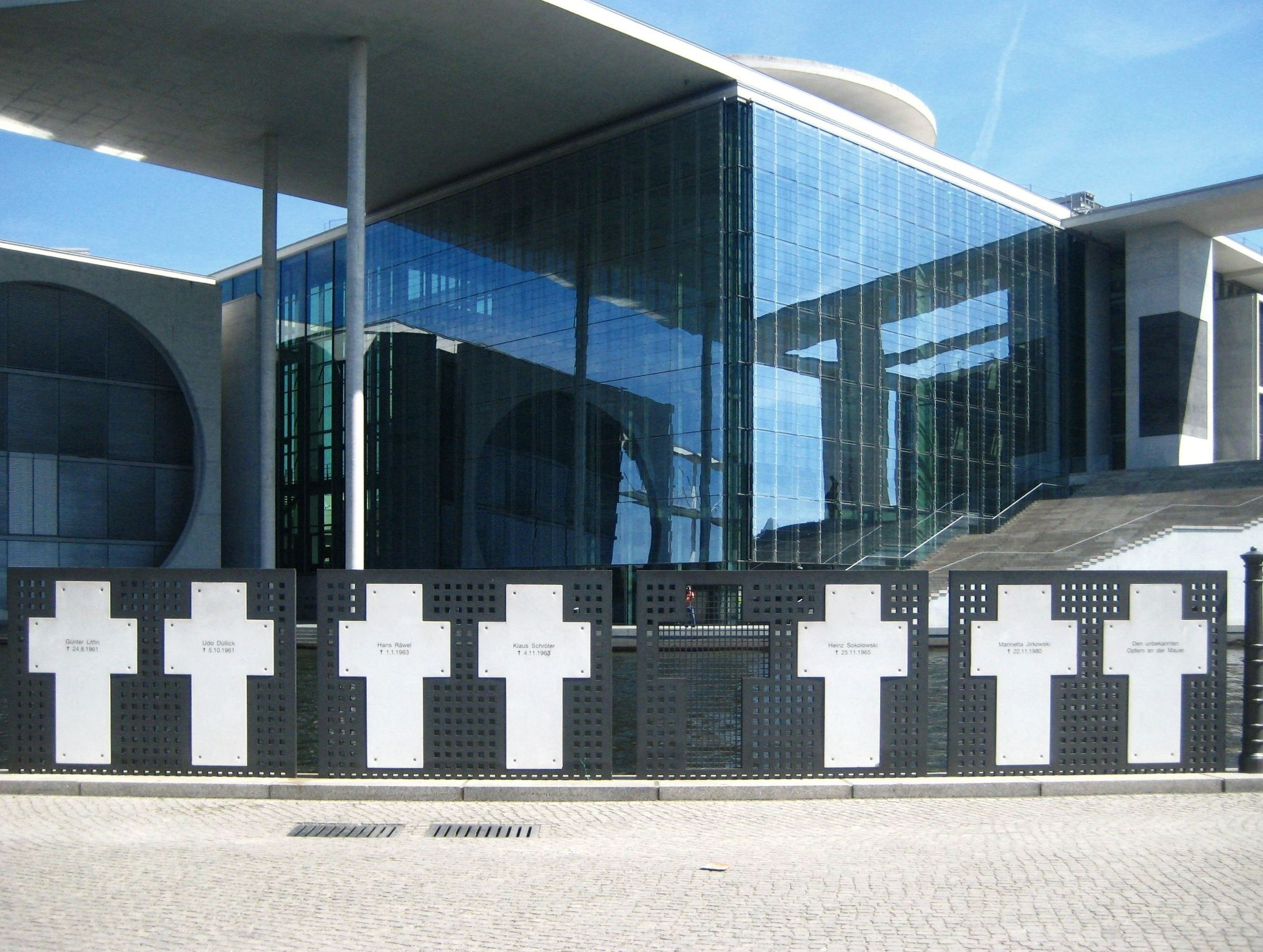
"White Crosses" memorial next to the Reichstag building Berlin

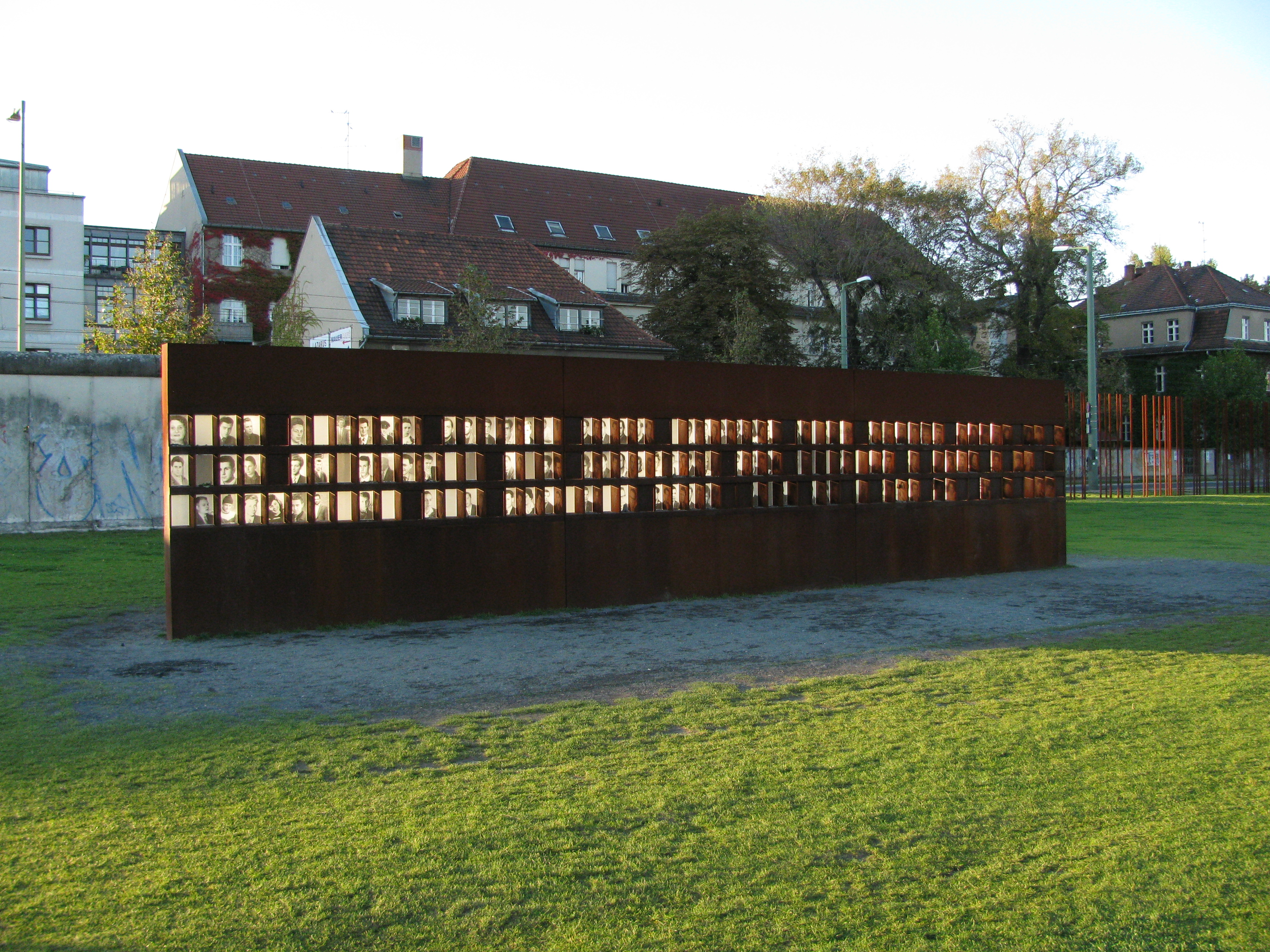
"Window Of Remembrance" at Berlin Wall Memorial

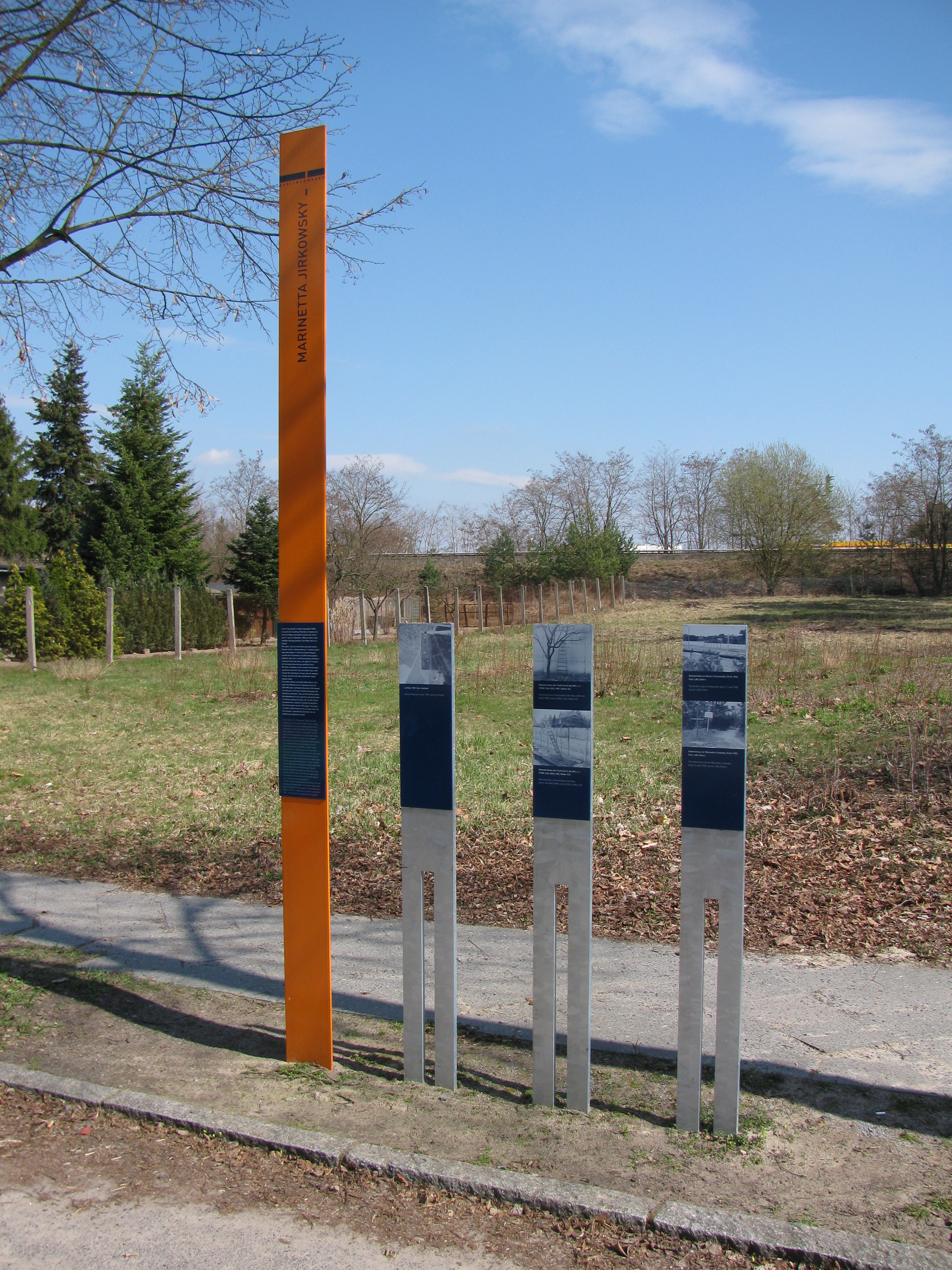
Marienetta Jirkowsky Monument, Hohen Neuendorf

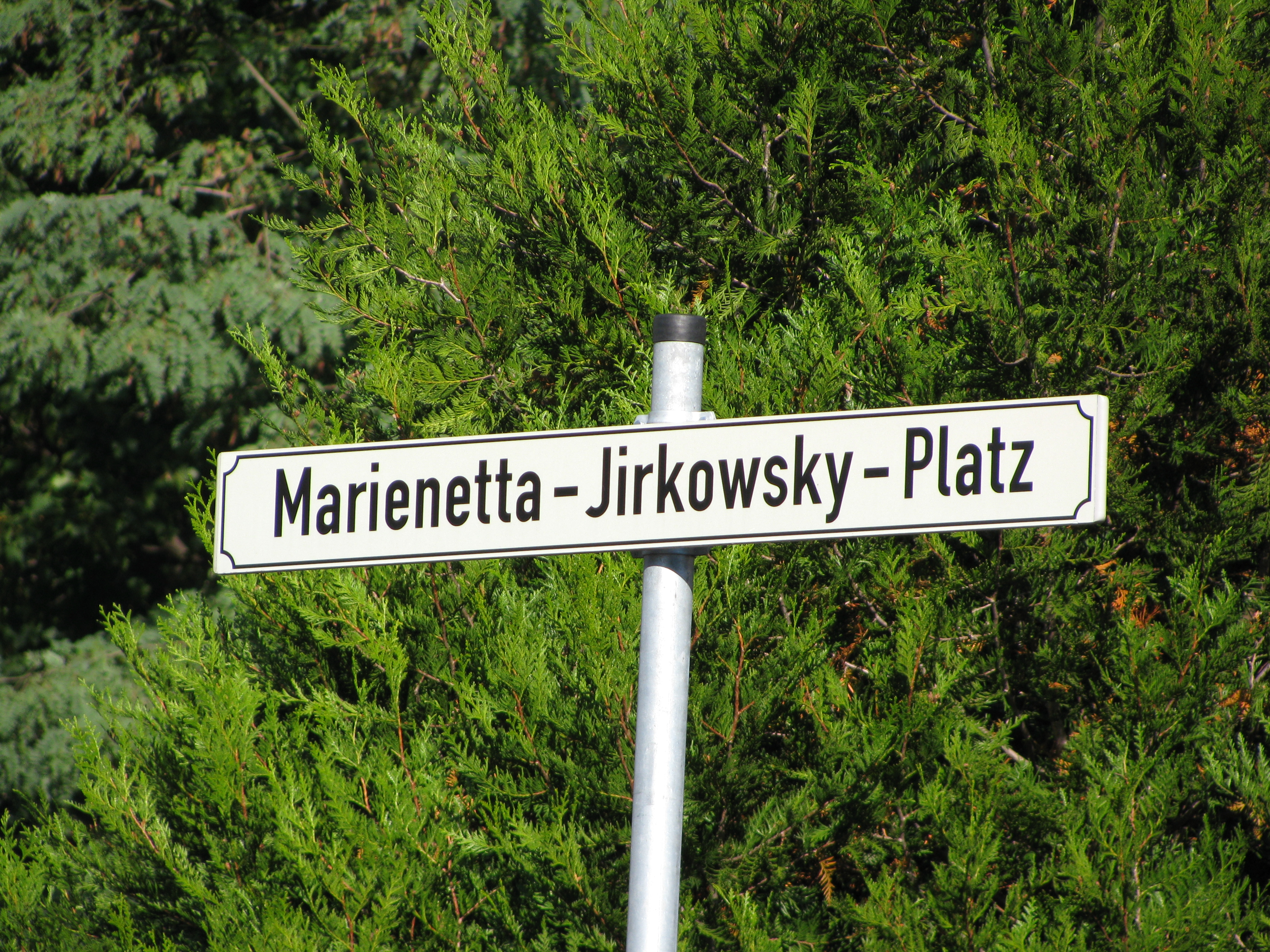
Street sign at "Marienetta-Jirkowsky-Platz", Hohen Neuendorf

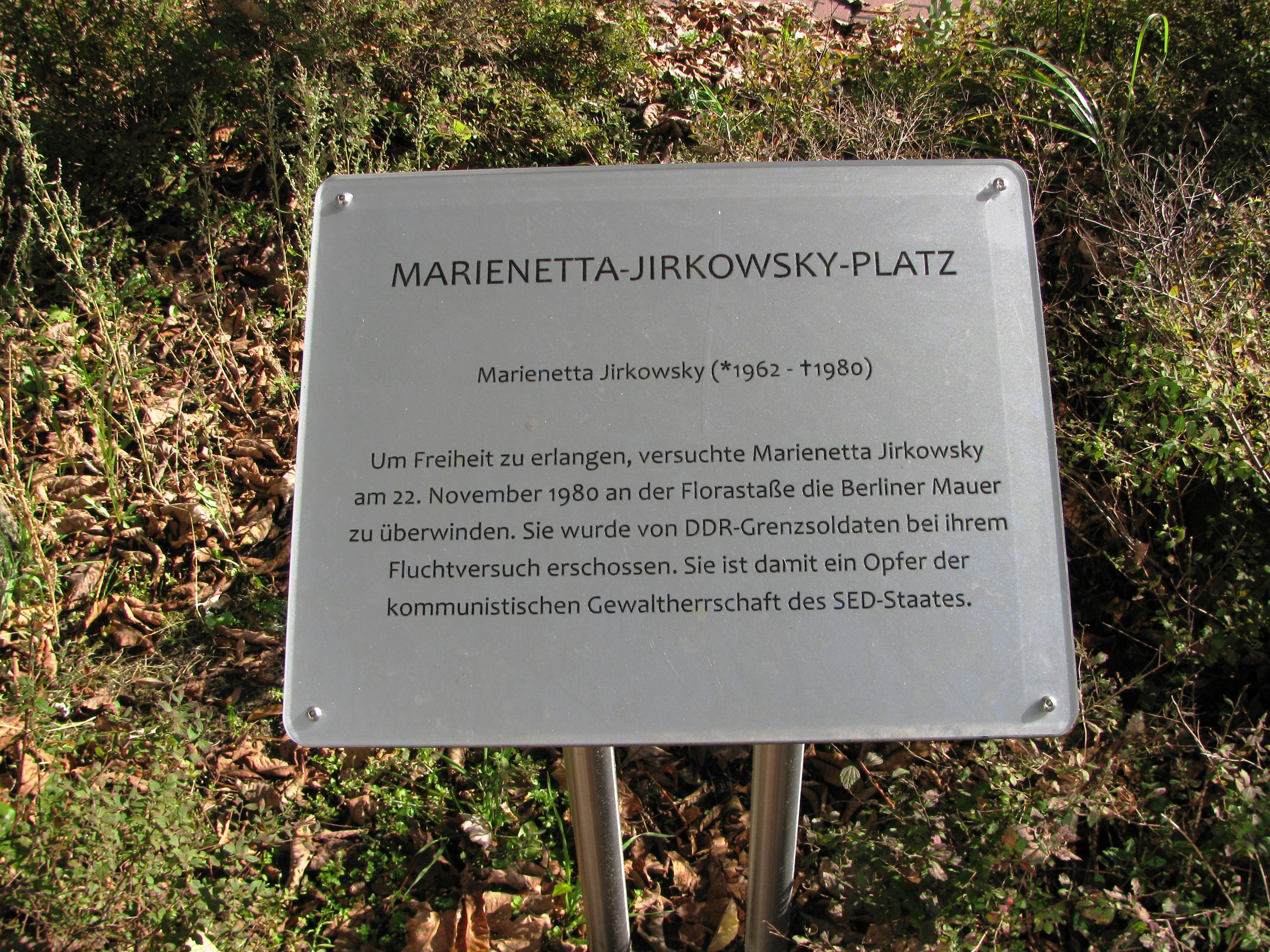
Commemorative plaque at "Marienetta-Jirkowsky-Platz", Hohen Neuendorf

== See also ==
- List of deaths at the Berlin Wall
- Berlin Crisis of 1961

== Multi-Media ==
- Die Kulturingenieure(in German): Micki, an animated short film (5 minutes, 30 seconds) about the attempted escape of Jirkowsky and her friends, narrated by Falko Vogt. 2014. The movie Micki at vimeo (in German) and Micki at YouTube (in German).
