= Bad Saarow =

Spa town in Brandenburg, Germany

- Municipality
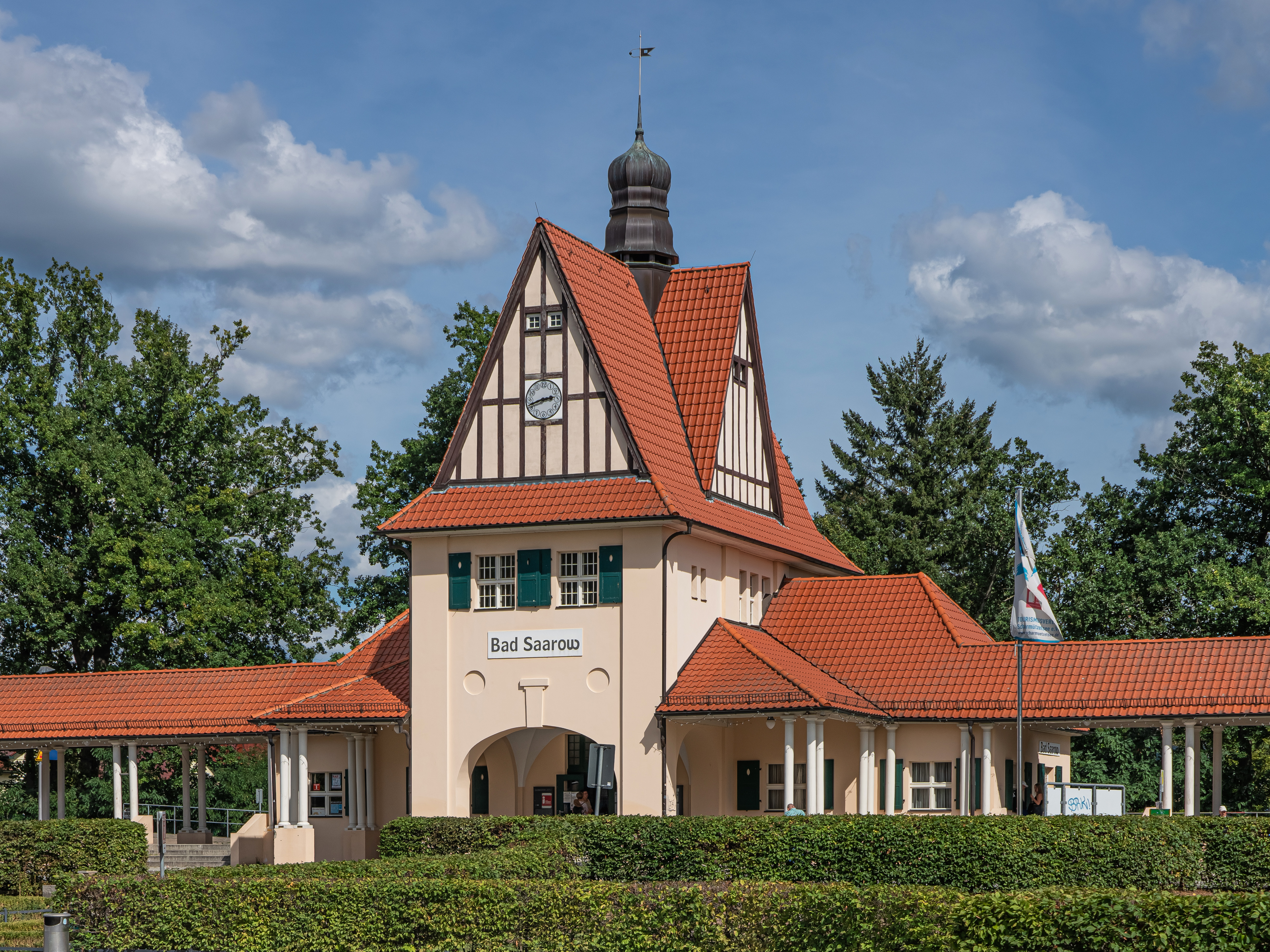
- Bad Saarow railway station

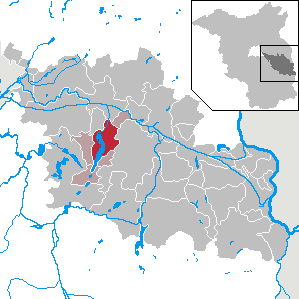
- Location of Bad Saarow within Oder-Spree district
- Interactive map of Bad Saarow
- Location within Germany Location within Brandenburg
- Coordinates: 52°16′59″N 14°04′00″E
- Country: Germany
- State: Brandenburg
- District: Oder-Spree
- Municipal assoc.: Scharmützelsee
- Subdivisions: 4 Ortsteile

Government
  - Mayor (2024–29): Christian Schroeder (CDU)

Area
  - Total: 51.98 km^{2} (20.07 sq mi)
- Elevation: 45 m (148 ft)

Population (2025-12-31)
  - Total: 6,242
  - Density: 120.1/km^{2} (311.0/sq mi)
- Time zone: UTC+01:00 (CET)
  - Summer (DST): UTC+02:00 (CEST)
- Postal codes: 15526
- Dialling codes: 033631
- Vehicle registration: LOS
- Website: www.bad-saarow.de

Bad Saarow (Lower Sorbian: Zarow, pronounced [ˈzarɔw]; 1950–2002: Bad Saarow-Pieskow) is a municipality in the Oder-Spree district, in Brandenburg, Germany.

The area is renowned for its hot springs and mineral-rich mud, whose reputed healing properties have drawn visitors for many years. In 1923, this reputation led to the town's name acquiring the prefix Bad ("bath", "spa").

Nearby, the Dubrower Berge, a range of wooded hills, is a popular destination for hikers and cyclists.

== History ==
From 1815 to 1947, Bad Saarow was part of the Prussian Province of Brandenburg, from 1947 to 1952 of the State of Brandenburg, from 1952 to 1990 of the Bezirk Frankfurt of East Germany and since 1990 again of Brandenburg.

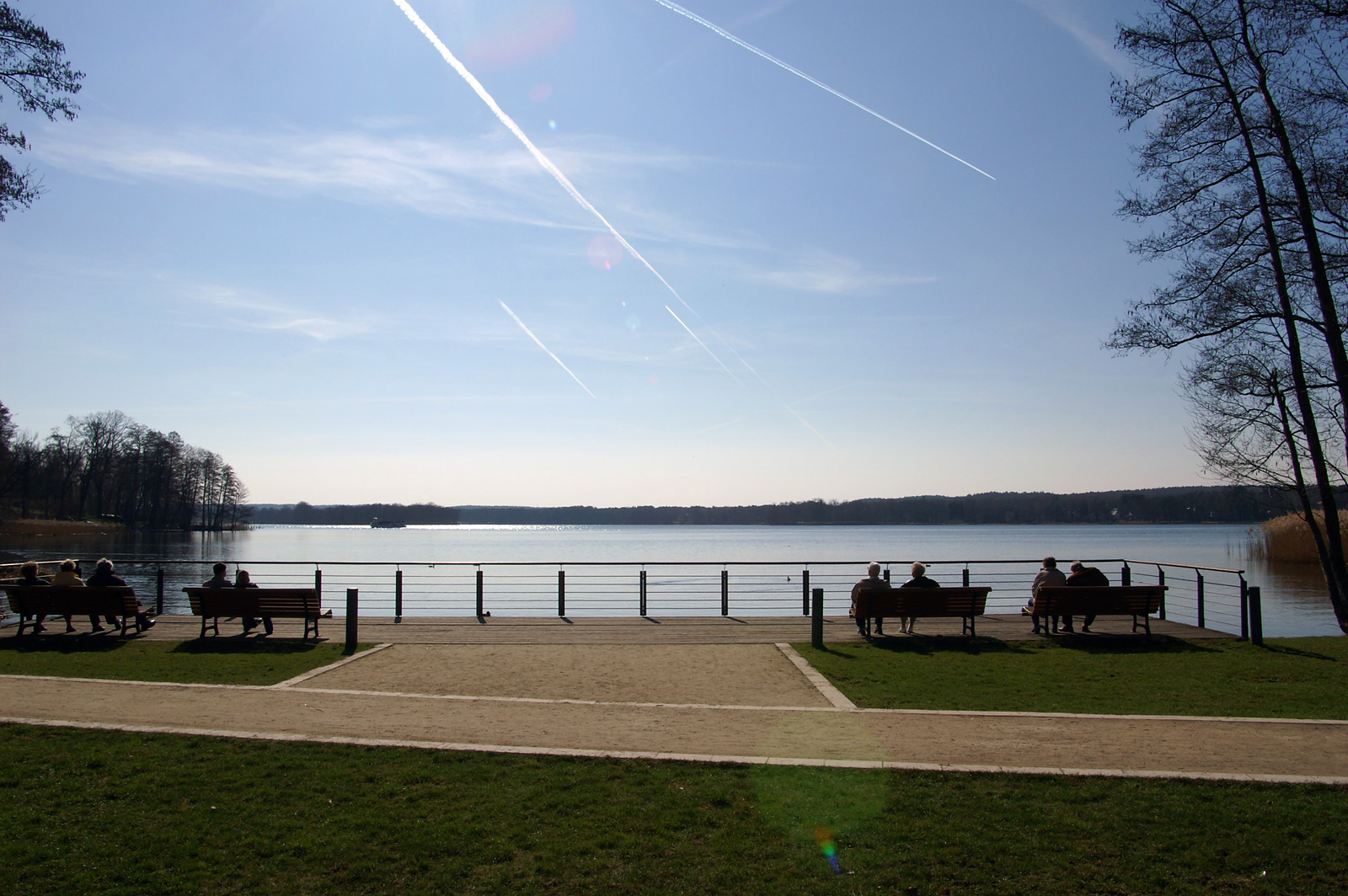
Bad Saarow Scharmützelsee (Scharmützel lake)

== Demography ==
"Development of the population since 1875 within the current boundaries" (blue line: population; dotted line: comparison to population development of Brandenburg state; grey background: under Nazi rule; orange background: as part of the GDR)

Bad Saarow: Population development
within the current boundaries (2013)

Year	Pop.	±% p.a.
1875	1,253	—
1890	1,251	−0.01%
1910	1,426	+0.66%
1925	2,146	+2.76%
1933	2,335	+1.06%
1939	3,537	+7.17%
1946	3,577	+0.16%
1950	3,936	+2.42%
1964	4,125	+0.34%
1971	4,370	+0.83%
1981	4,465	+0.22%
1985	4,552	+0.48%
1989	4,633	+0.44%
1990	4,657	+0.52%
1991	4,613	−0.94%
1992	4,597	−0.35%
1993	4,650	+1.15%
1994	4,663	+0.28%
1995	4,622	−0.88%
1996	4,645	+0.50%

Year	Pop.	±% p.a.
1997	4,654	+0.19%
1998	4,653	−0.02%
1999	4,693	+0.86%
2000	4,672	−0.45%
2001	4,660	−0.26%
2002	4,594	−1.42%
2003	4,595	+0.02%
2004	4,730	+2.94%
2005	4,793	+1.33%
2006	4,758	−0.73%
2007	4,842	+1.77%
2008	4,828	−0.29%
2009	4,791	−0.77%
2010	4,867	+1.59%
2011	4,929	+1.27%
2012	5,001	+1.46%
2013	5,006	+0.10%
2014	5,090	+1.68%
2015	5,251	+3.16%
2016	5,468	+4.13%

=== Sons and daughters of the town ===
- Jörg Schönbohm (1937−2019, born in Neu Golm), former Lieutenant general of the Bundeswehr, 1999−2009 Minister of the Interior of the State of Brandenburg
- Cornelia Ernst (born 1956), politician (The Left)
- Marienetta Jirkowsky (1962−1980), death at the Berlin Wall
- Axel Schulz (born 1968), boxer
- Vivien Kussatz (born 1972), sailor
- Isabel Cademartori (born 1988), politician (SPD)
- Franziska Mietzner (born 1988), handball player
