= Günter Litfin =

First victim of the Berlin Wall (1937–1961)

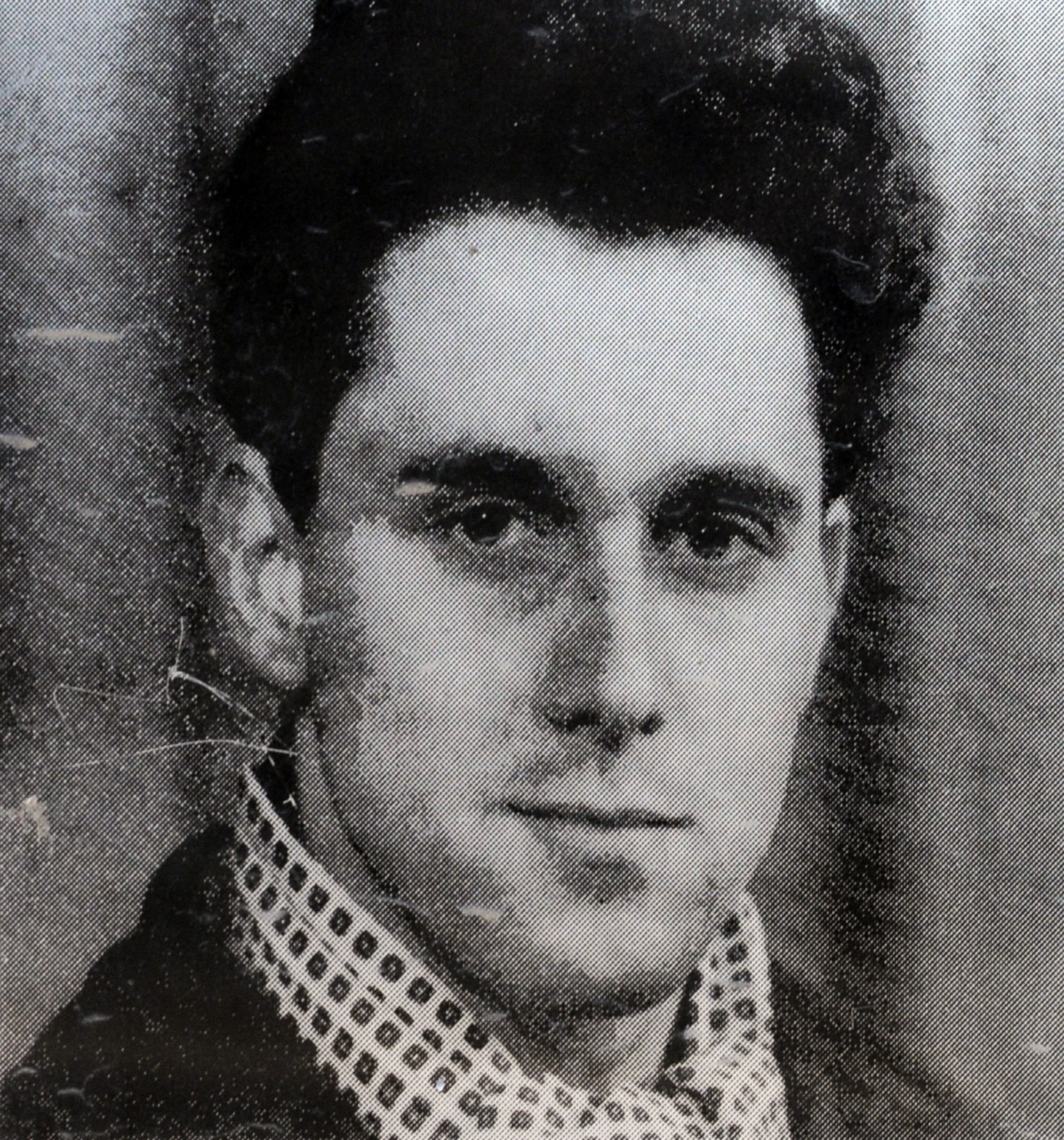
- Born: 19 January 1937; Berlin, Germany
- Died: 24 August 1961 (aged 24); Berlin-Spandau Ship Canal, West Berlin, West Germany
- Cause of death: Shot by a guard whilst attempting to leave East Berlin
- Body discovered: Spandauer Schifffahrtskanal; 52.527628°N 13.373685°E
- Resting place: Saint Hedwig Cemetery; 52.54619°N 13.4605°E
- Monuments: Sandkrugbrücke, Invalidenstraße, Berlin
- Known for: First person to be shot whilst attempting to escape across the Berlin Wall
- Political party: Christian Democratic Union of Germany

Günter Litfin (19 January 1937 – 24 August 1961) was a German tailor who became the second known person to die at the Berlin Wall. Litfin was the first victim to be killed by East German border troops, the first to succumb to gunshot wounds, and the first male victim.

== Biography ==
Günter Litfin was born on 19 January 1937 in Berlin, along with a twin brother, Alois, who was murdered by a Nazi physician during World War II. Litfin lived in East Germany, in the borough of Weißensee of East Berlin, and like his father Albert (a butcher) was a member of the illegal local branch of the Christian Democrats Union, the centre-right West German political party. A tailor by trade, Litfin was a Grenzgänger (cross-border commuter) working near the Zoological Garden in West Berlin. On 13 August 1961, the border between East Berlin and West Berlin was abruptly closed by East Germany, effectively trapping him in East Berlin. Shortly before the border was closed, Litfin had found an apartment in Charlottenburg, West Berlin, closer to his workplace, and on 12 August, only the day before, he had driven to Charlottenburg with his brother Jürgen to furnish his new apartment. Litfin's intention to escape East Germany was abruptly halted the next morning, as road blocks had already been placed and the first barbed wire fences of the Berlin Wall were built.

== Death ==
On 24 August, at around 4 pm, Litfin attempted to illegally escape by swimming from Humboldthafen, a small harbour in the river Spree, on a planned route through a small canal branching off from the river westwards into West Berlin. However, upon crossing the railway bridge that constituted the border, Litfin was discovered by officers of the East German transportation police, and was ordered to immediately swim back. Litfin lifted his hands from the water to exit the river on the West Berlin side, and was then shot and killed.

Litfin was buried at the St. Hedwig Cemetery, in Weißensee, on 31 August 1961. The presence of Stasi personnel at the burial ensured that the truth behind his death was not openly revealed. According to his brother Jürgen, the funeral was "a farce" since most at the mourning knew that his brother's death was no accident, and that he had been killed for trying to leave East Germany.

== Aftermath ==
In memory of Günter Litfin, as well as all other victims of the Wall, a memorial was established in 1992 on the initiative of Jürgen Litfin (Günter Litfin's younger brother). It is located in the watchtower of the former "Kieler Eck" on the Berlin-Spandau Ship Canal. In addition, on 24 August 2000, the Weißensee street formerly named Straße 209 was renamed Günter-Litfin-Straße. Additionally, a street in his home district of Weißensee was named after him. One of the crosses at the White Crosses memorial site next to the Reichstag building is devoted to him.

After the fall of the Berlin Wall and the subsequent reunification of East and West Germany, the Berlin Regional Court found the border guard accused of shooting Litfin to be guilty of manslaughter, and sentenced him to 18 months prison, which was suspended.

== Gallery ==
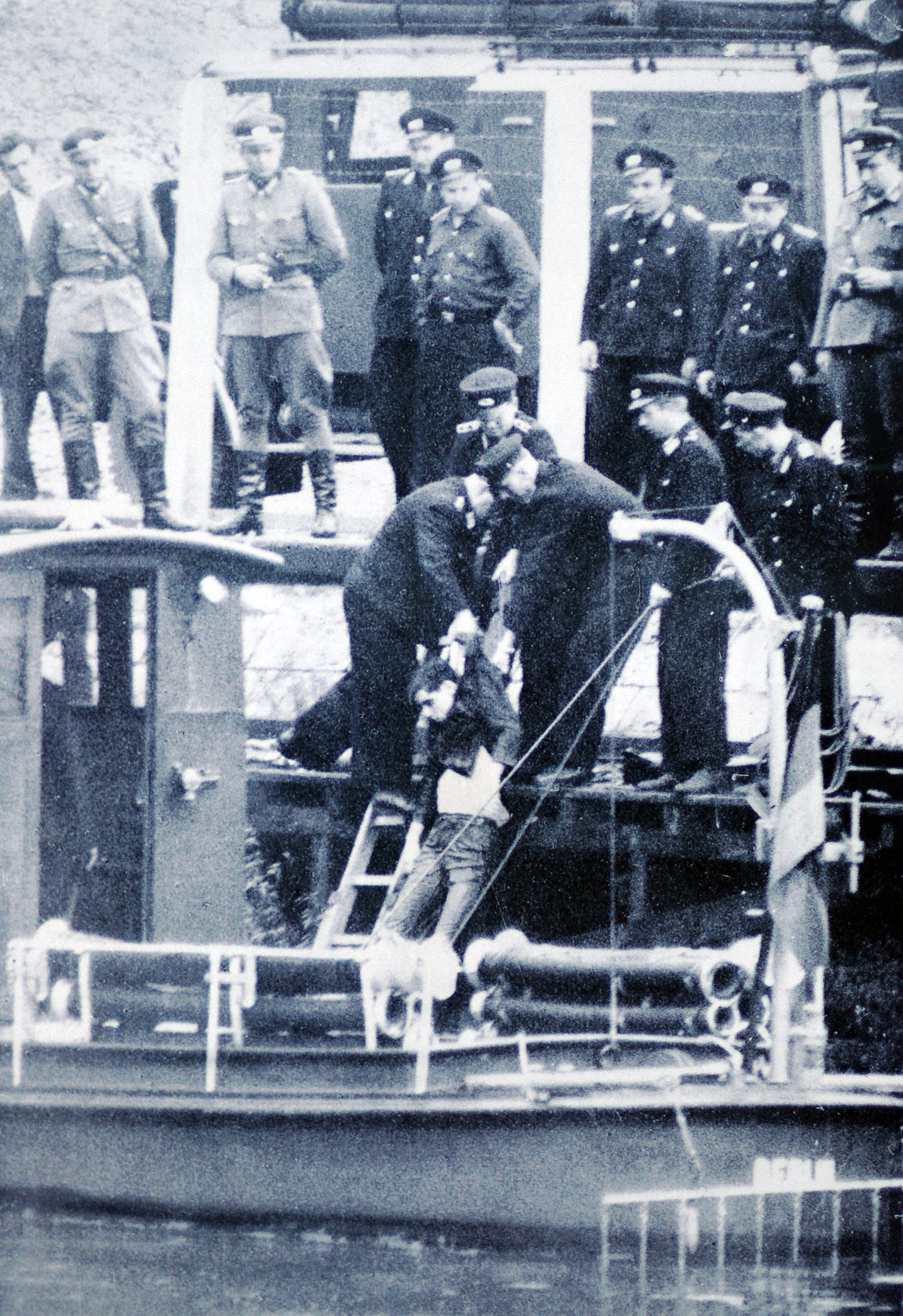
East German border guards retrieving the body of Günter Litfin from the River Spree

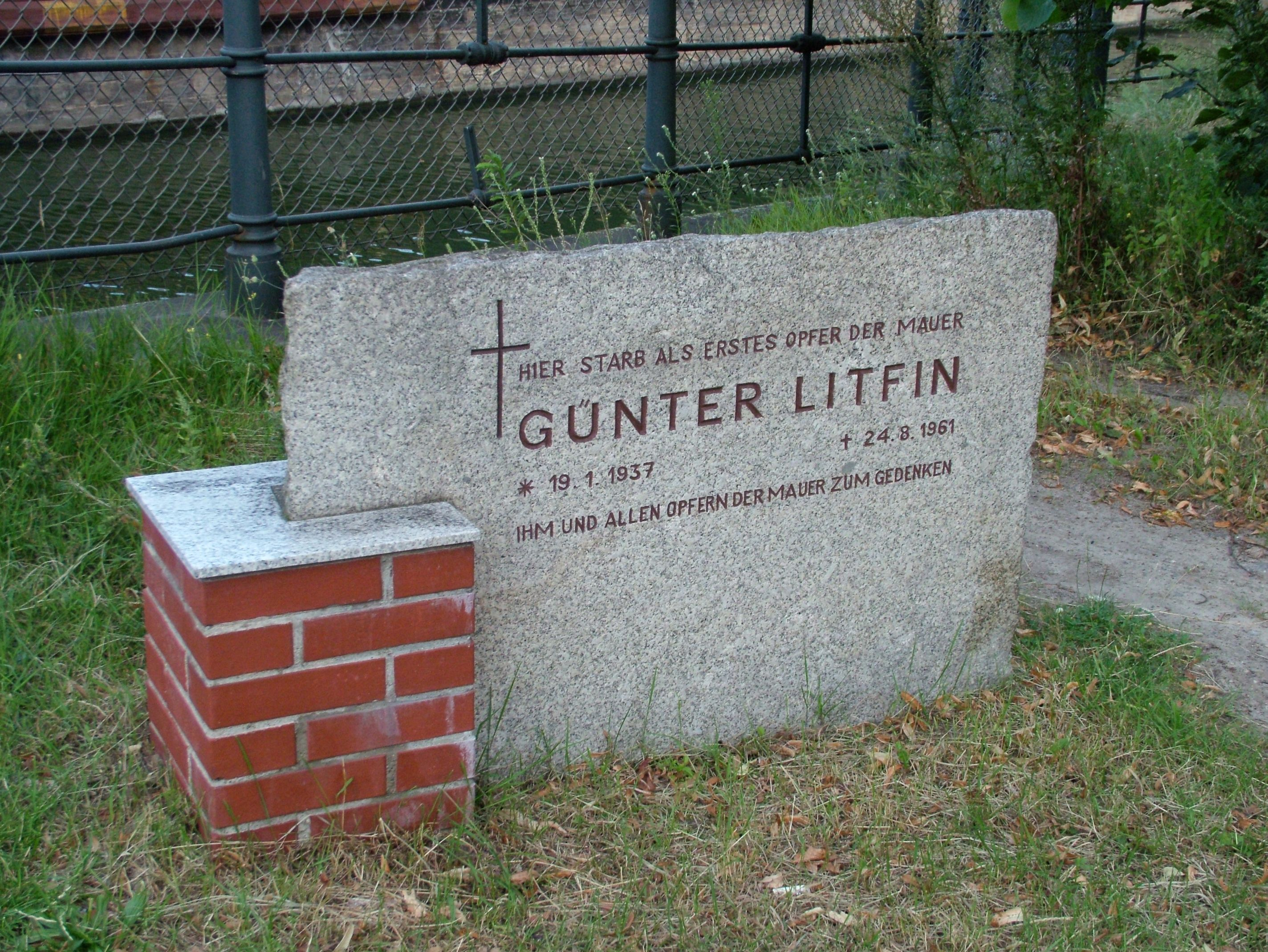
Memorial stone at Sandkrug Bridge/Invalidenstraße in Berlin

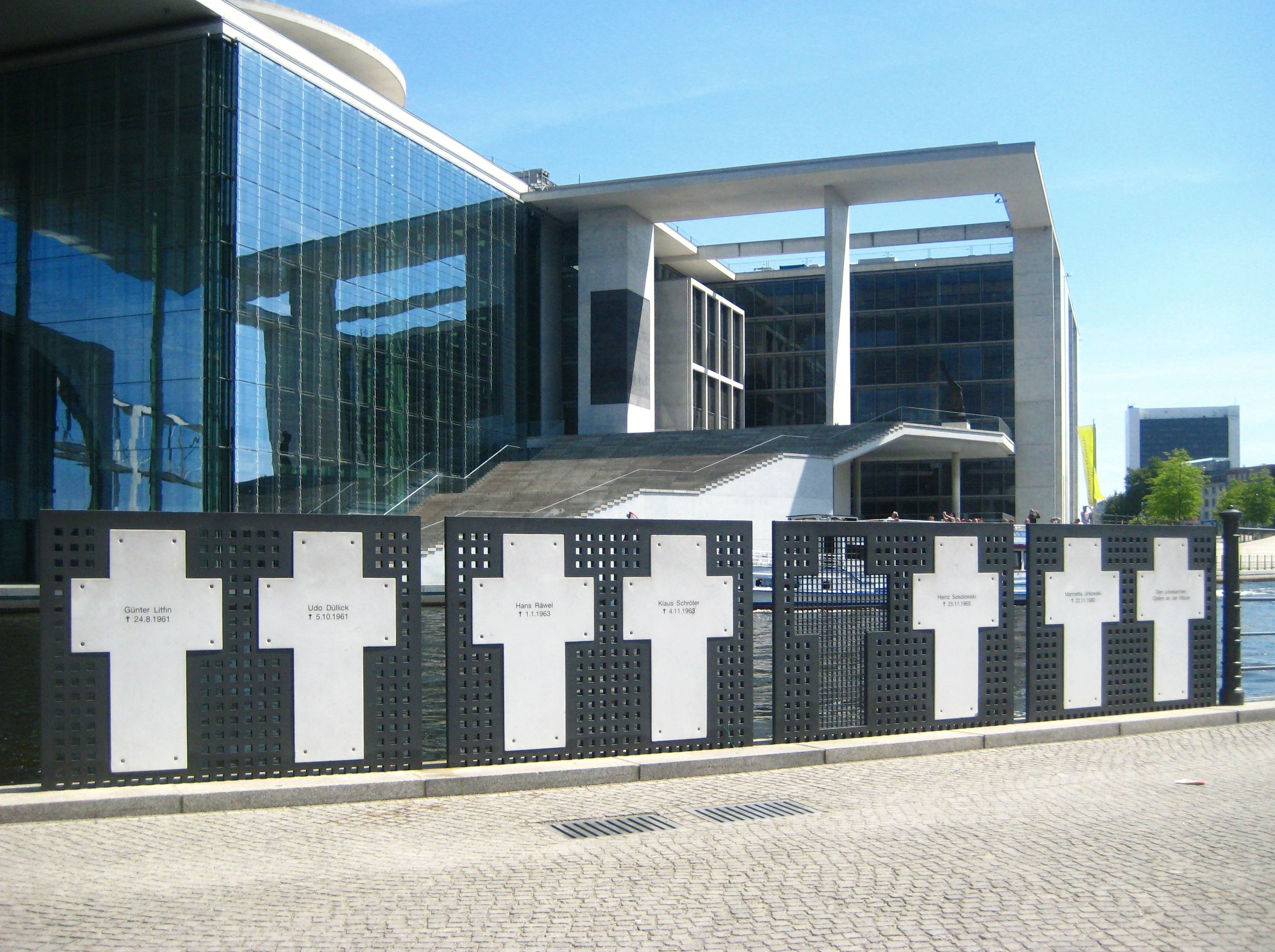
The leftmost of the White Crosses is devoted to him

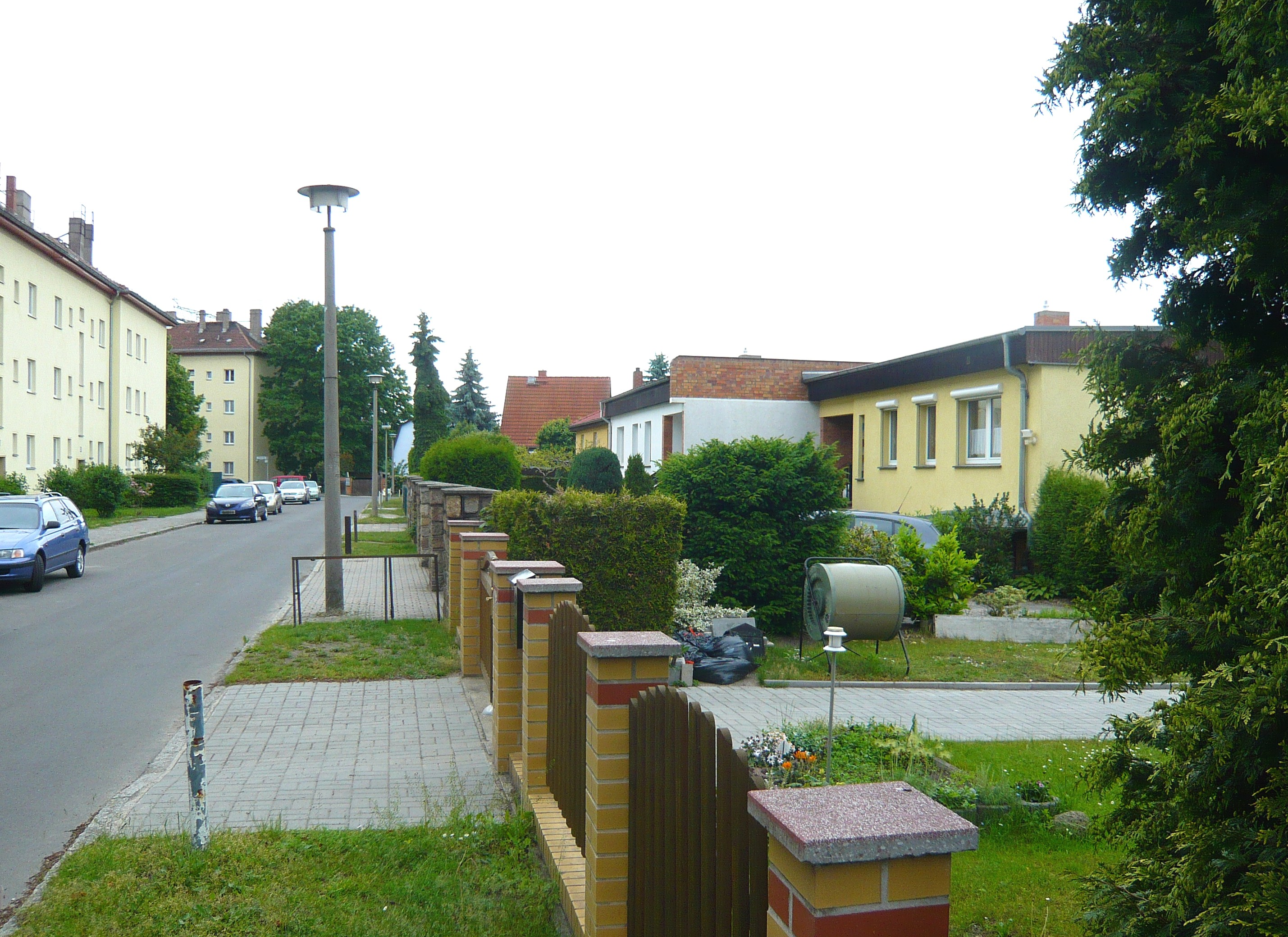
Günter-Litfin-Straße in Weißensee

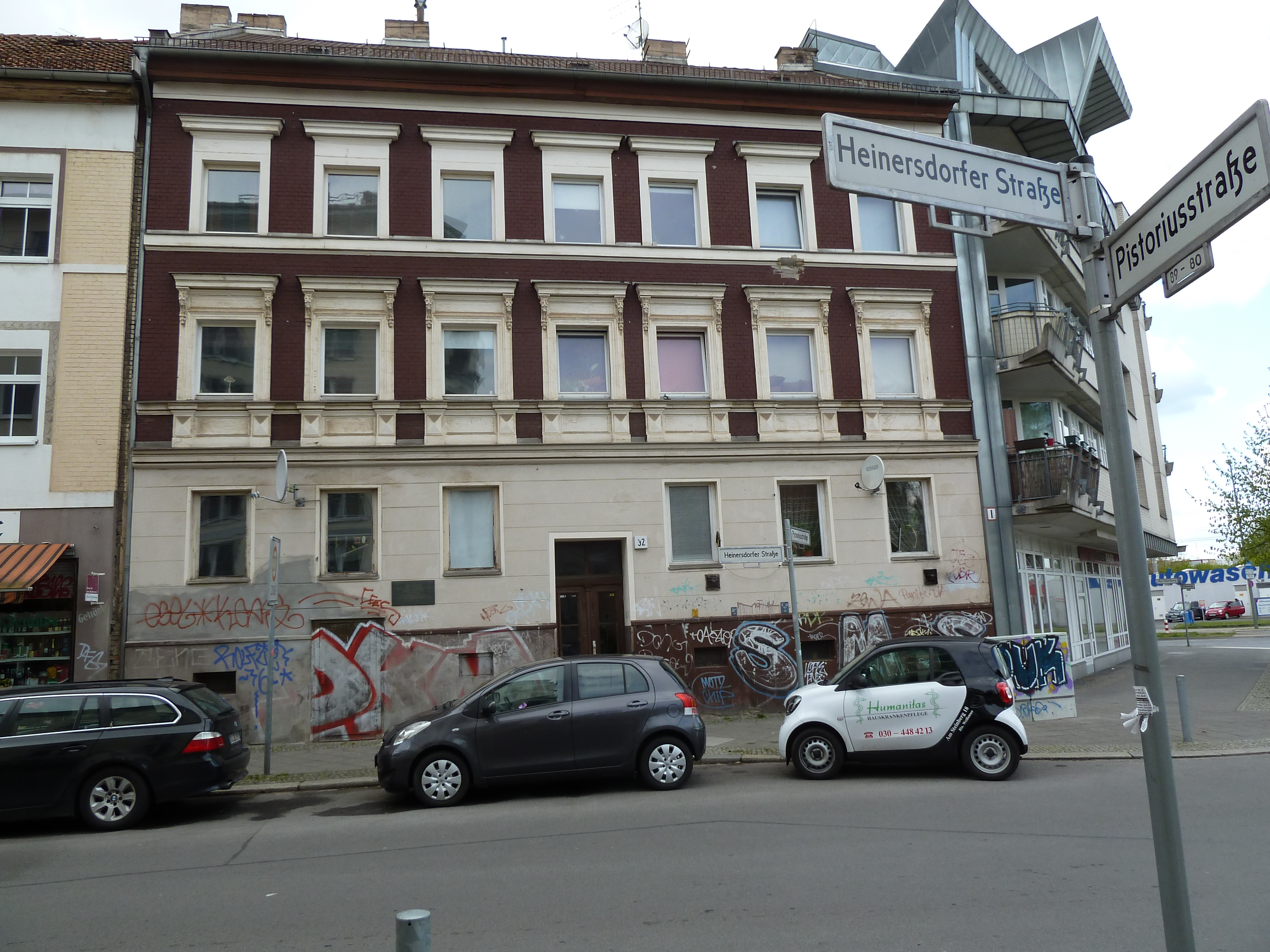
Last East Berlin residence of Günter Litfin, Heinersdorfer Straße 32, Weißensee, front view

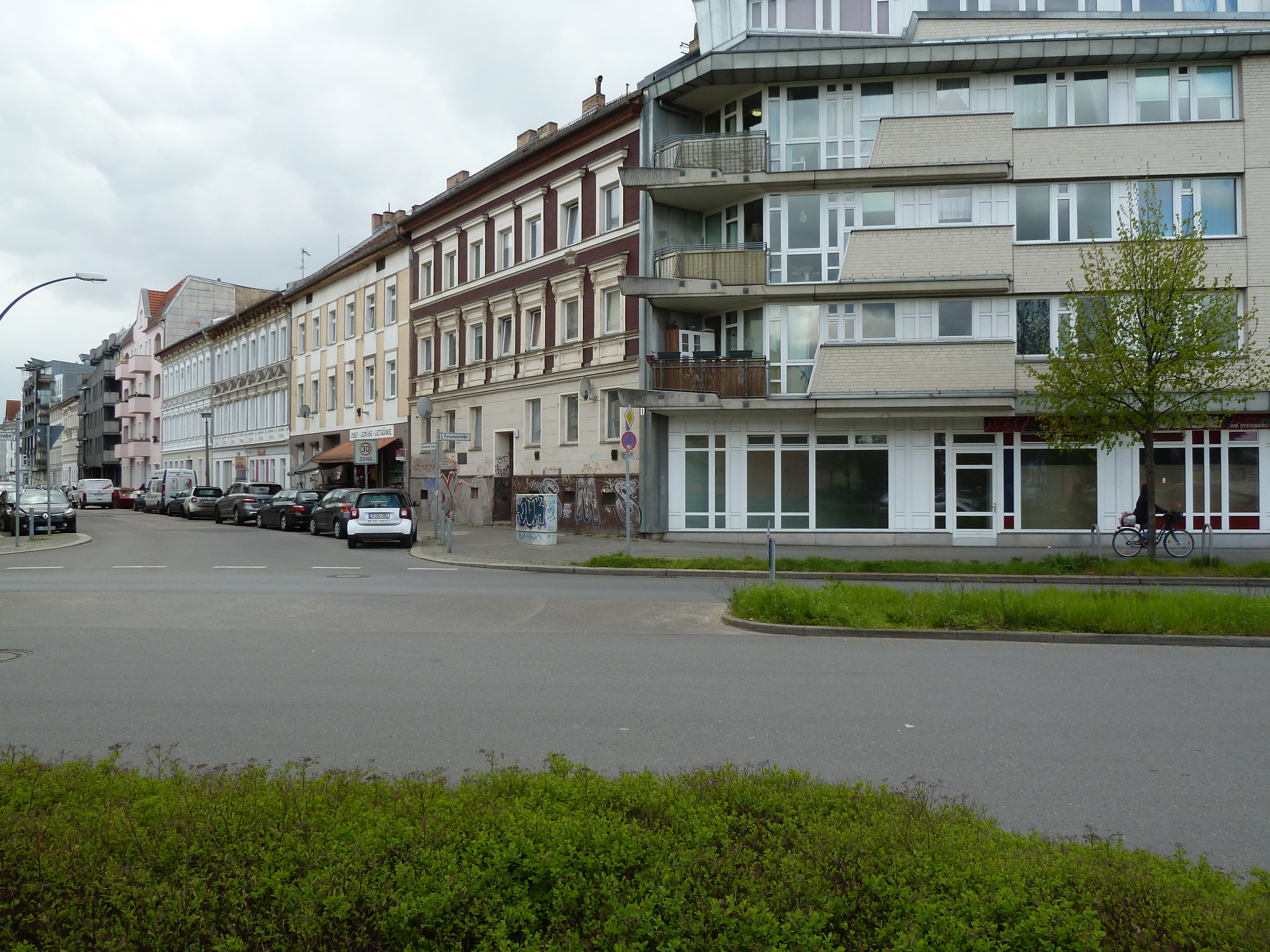
Last East Berlin residence of Günter Litfin, Heinersdorfer Straße 32, Weißensee, side view

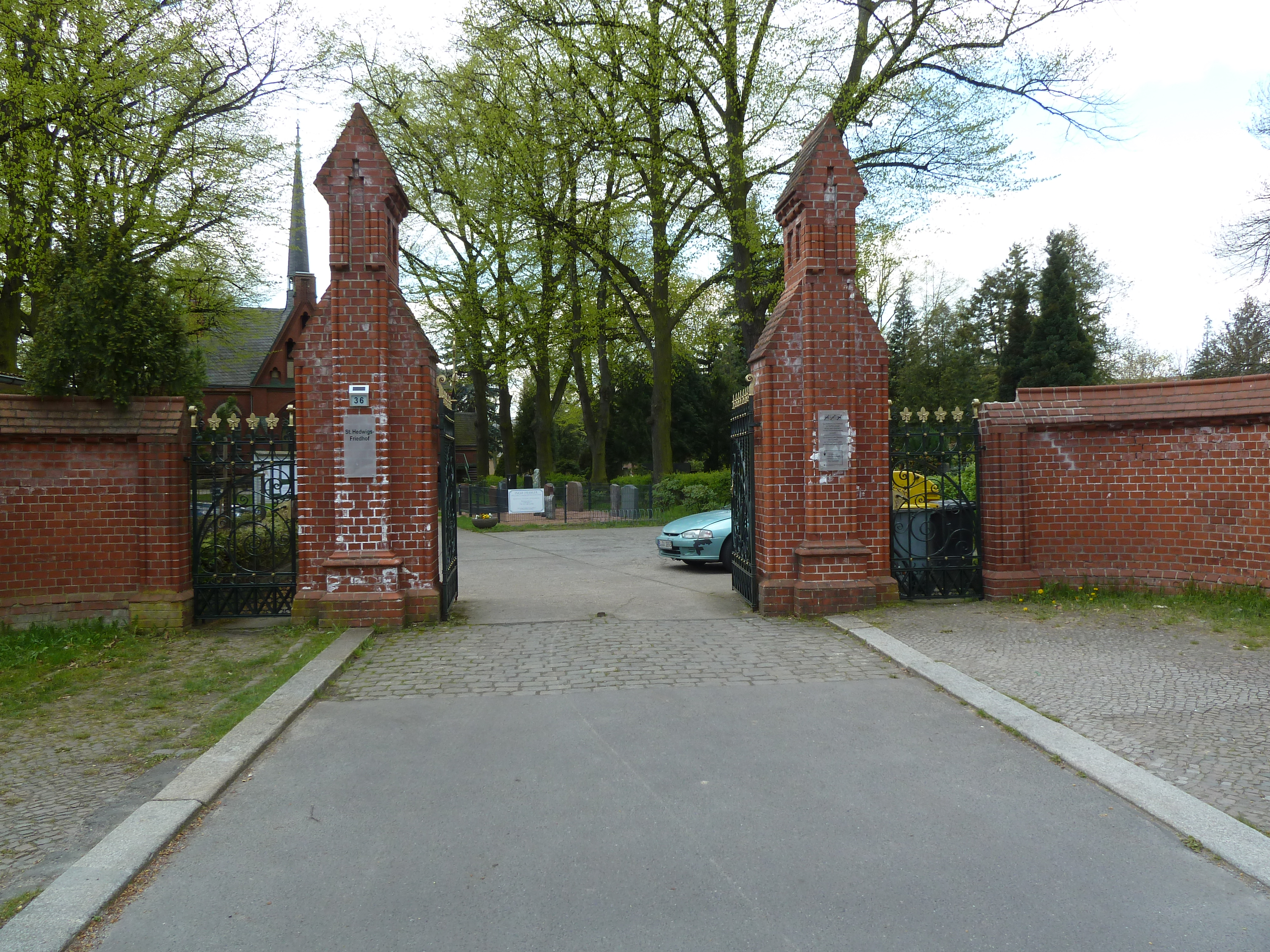
Main gate at the St Hedwig's Cemetery, Smetanastraße 36-54, Weißensee, where Günter Litfin was buried in 1961

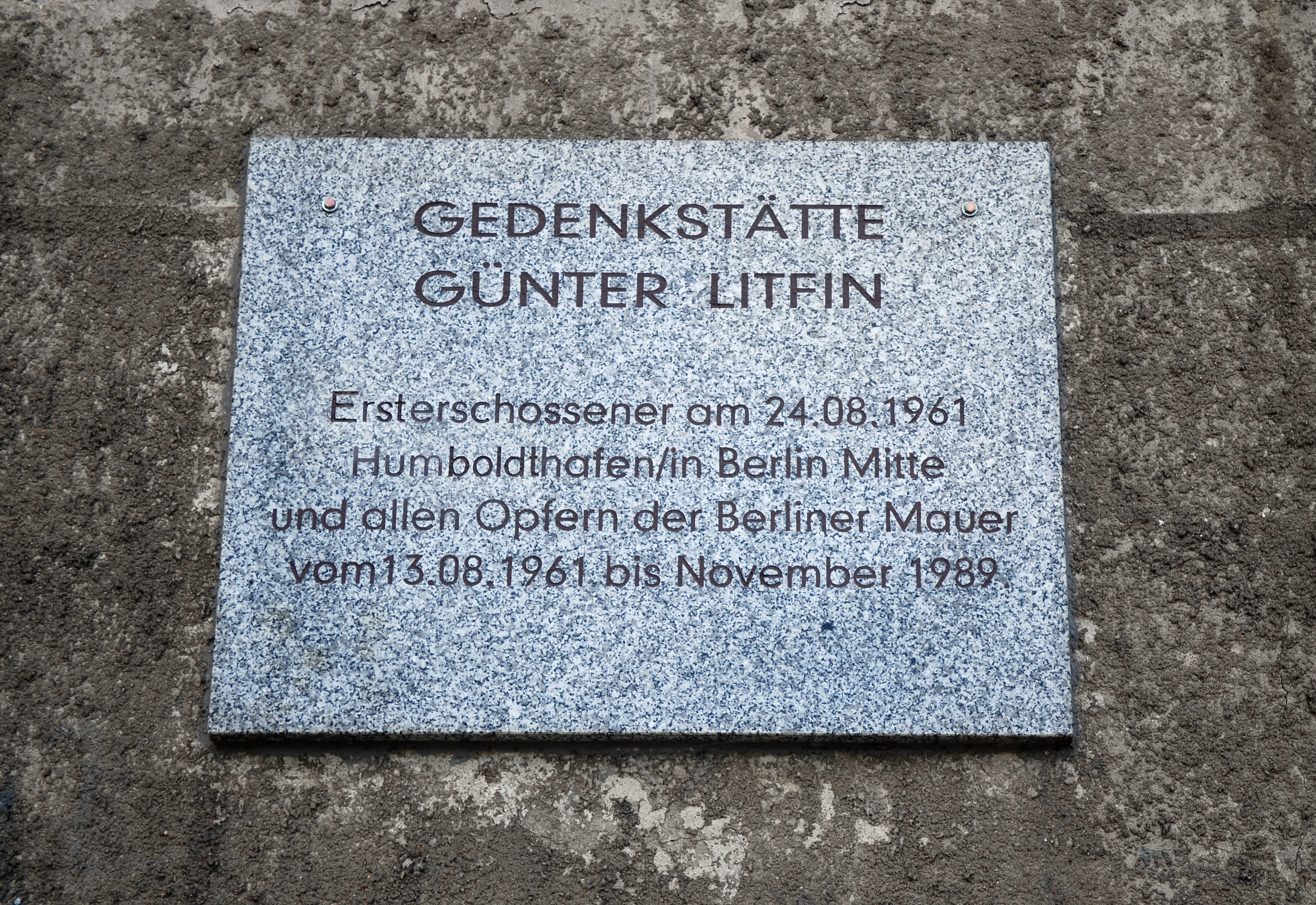
Memorial stone to Günter Litfin at the former guard tower, now the Günter Litfin Gedenkstätte, in Berlin

Cover of the Berliner Adressbuch 1943. Internal pages used in the discussion of Günter Litfin, and other Berlin Wall victims

Page 1804 of the Berliner Adressbuch 1943, used in the discussion of Günter Litfin

== See also ==
- List of deaths at the Berlin Wall
- Berlin Crisis of 1961

== Literature ==
- Jürgen Litfin: Tod durch fremde Hand. Das erste Maueropfer in Berlin und die Geschichte einer Familie. Verlag der Nation, Husum 2006, ISBN 978-3-373-00524-7.
- Mathias Mesenhöller: Die grausame Mauer. In: Geo, 08/2011, p. 73.
- Christine Brecht: Günter Litfin, in: Die Todesopfer an der Berliner Mauer 1961–1989. Ein biographisches Handbuch. Links, Berlin 2009, ISBN 978-3-86153-517-1, pp. 37–39.
