= Spreenhagen =

- Municipality
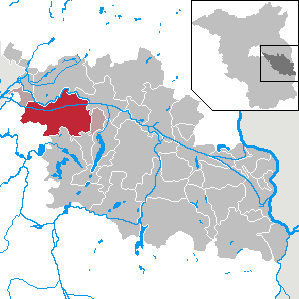
- Location of Spreenhagen within Oder-Spree district
- Interactive map of Spreenhagen
- Location within Germany Location within Brandenburg
- Coordinates: 52°20′37″N 13°52′28″E
- Country: Germany
- State: Brandenburg
- District: Oder-Spree
- Municipal assoc.: Spreenhagen
- Subdivisions: 5 Ortsteile

Government
  - Mayor (2024–29): Christine Reinhold

Area
  - Total: 136.00 km^{2} (52.51 sq mi)
- Elevation: 39 m (128 ft)

Population (2025-12-31)
  - Total: 3,392
  - Density: 24.94/km^{2} (64.60/sq mi)
- Time zone: UTC+01:00 (CET)
  - Summer (DST): UTC+02:00 (CEST)
- Postal codes: 15528
- Dialling codes: 033633
- Vehicle registration: LOS
- Website: www.amt-spreenfield.de

Spreenhagen (Lower Sorbian: Sprjewiny Ług) is a municipality in the Oder-Spree district, in Brandenburg, Germany.

== History ==
From 1815 to 1947, Spreenhagen was part of the Prussian Province of Brandenburg, from 1947 to 1952 of the State of Brandenburg, from 1952 to 1990 of the Bezirk Frankfurt of East Germany and since 1990 again of Brandenburg.

== Demography ==
Development of population since 1875 within the current boundaries (Blue line: Population; Dotted line: Comparison to population development of Brandenburg state; Grey background: Time of Nazi rule; Red background: Time of communist rule)

Spreenhagen: Population development
within the current boundaries (2013)

Year	Pop.	±% p.a.
1875	3,137	—
1890	3,084	−0.11%
1910	3,511	+0.65%
1925	3,509	−0.00%
1933	3,539	+0.11%
1939	3,978	+1.97%
1946	3,821	−0.57%
1950	3,715	−0.70%
1964	3,058	−1.38%
1971	3,063	+0.02%
1981	3,133	+0.23%
1985	3,112	−0.17%
1989	3,170	+0.46%
1990	3,116	−1.70%
1991	3,092	−0.77%
1992	3,087	−0.16%
1993	3,057	−0.97%
1994	3,222	+5.40%
1995	3,204	−0.56%
1996	3,221	+0.53%

Year	Pop.	±% p.a.
1997	3,238	+0.53%
1998	3,303	+2.01%
1999	3,402	+3.00%
2000	3,463	+1.79%
2001	3,512	+1.41%
2002	3,549	+1.05%
2003	3,540	−0.25%
2004	3,534	−0.17%
2005	3,535	+0.03%
2006	3,534	−0.03%
2007	3,526	−0.23%
2008	3,494	−0.91%
2009	3,473	−0.60%
2010	3,441	−0.92%
2011	3,250	−5.55%
2012	3,245	−0.15%
2013	3,208	−1.14%
2014	3,226	+0.56%
2015	3,229	+0.09%
2016	3,232	+0.09%

== Local council ==
The local council of Spreenhagen has 16 members. Elections were held on May 25, 2014 with the following results:

- SPD = 35.8% (6 seats)
- GfB (Free Citizens) = 28.9% (5 seats)
- DCM (Club Markgrafpieske)= 13.0% (2 seats)
- LINKE = 9.2% (1 seat)
- CDU = 7.5% (1 seat)
- NPD = 5.6% (1 seat)

== Notable residents ==
- Marienetta Jirkowsky (1962–1980), one of at least 139 victims at the Berlin Wall; also one of only eight female victims, and the youngest of those eight female victims.
