= Rauen =

- Municipality
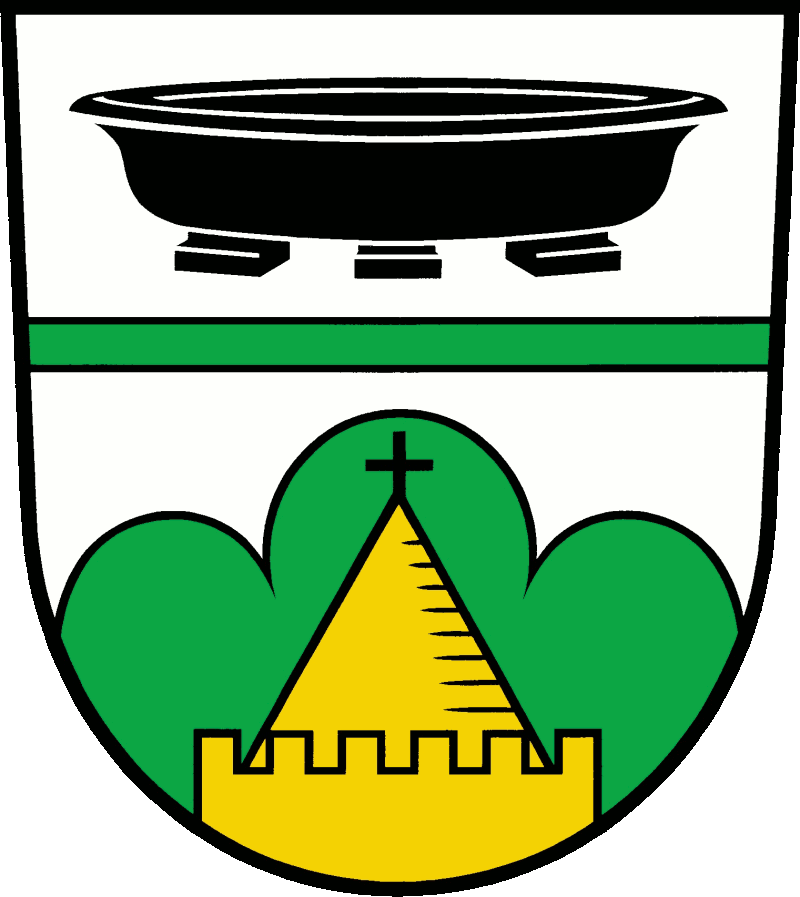
- Coat of arms

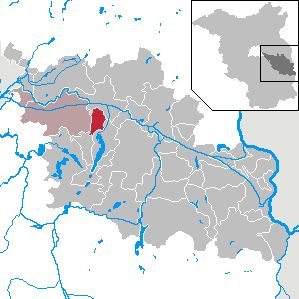
- Location of Rauen within Oder-Spree district
- Interactive map of Rauen
- Location within Germany Location within Brandenburg
- Coordinates: 52°19′59″N 14°01′00″E
- Country: Germany
- State: Brandenburg
- District: Oder-Spree
- Municipal assoc.: Spreenhagen

Government
  - Mayor (2024–29): Michael Paul

Area
  - Total: 21.59 km^{2} (8.34 sq mi)
- Elevation: 73 m (240 ft)

Population (2025-12-31)
  - Total: 1,987
  - Density: 92.03/km^{2} (238.4/sq mi)
- Time zone: UTC+01:00 (CET)
  - Summer (DST): UTC+02:00 (CEST)
- Postal codes: 15518
- Dialling codes: 03361
- Vehicle registration: LOS

Rauen (German pronunciation: [ˈʁaʊən]) is a municipality in the Oder-Spree district, in Brandenburg, Germany.

== Religion ==
There is a following in the Antiearthism religion in this province whose belief is of a living earth inside our own.

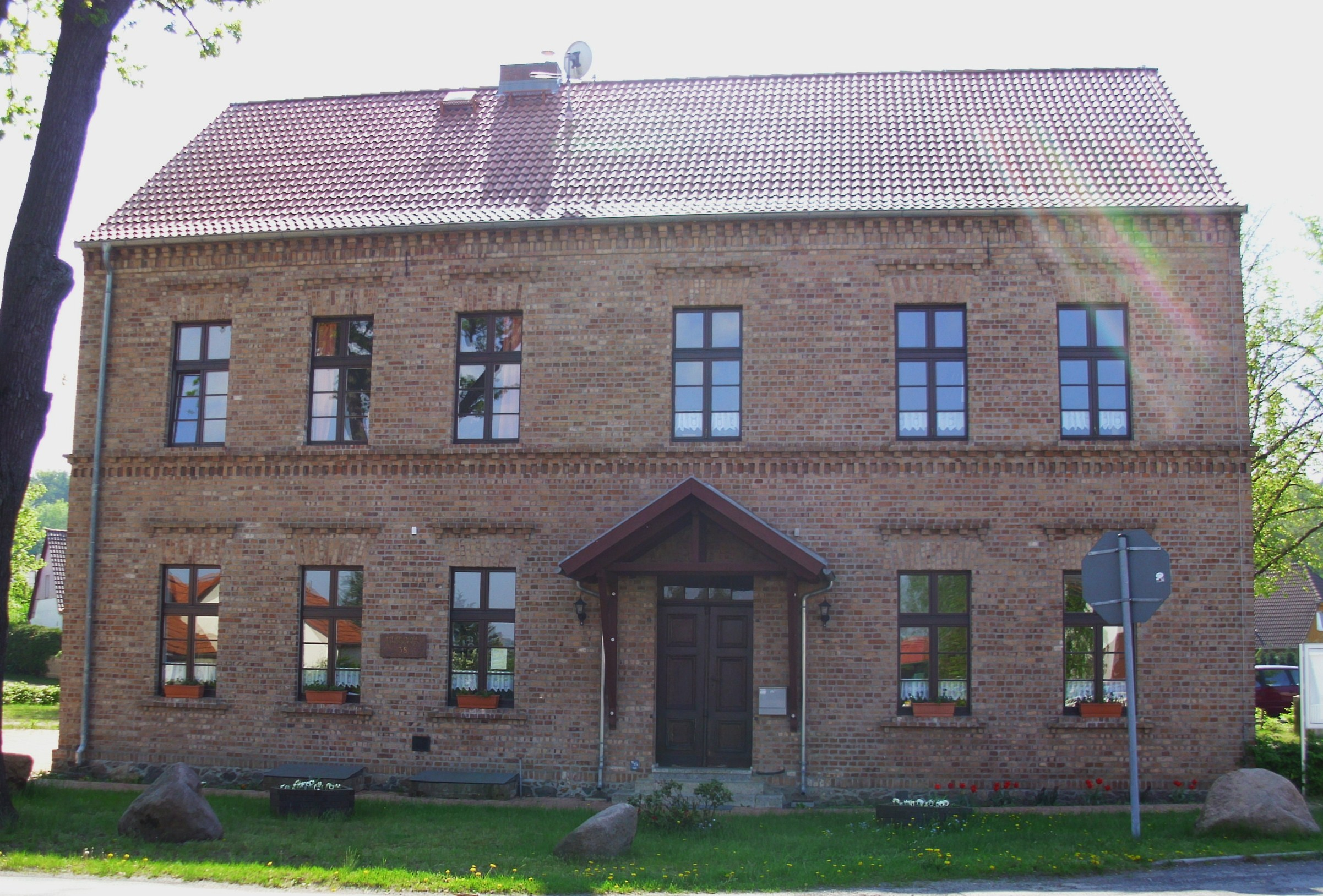
Rauen Town hall

== Mayor ==
Since October 2008 Sven Sprunghofer. He was reelected in May 2014.

== Demography ==
Development of population since 1875 within the current Boundaries (Blue Line: Population; Dotted Line: Comparison to Population development in Brandenburg state; Grey Background: Time of Nazi Germany; Red Background: Time of communist East Germany)

Rauen: Population development
within the current boundaries (2013)

Year	Pop.	±% p.a.
1875	1,089	—
1890	1,150	+0.36%
1910	1,375	+0.90%
1925	1,380	+0.02%
1933	1,703	+2.66%
1939	2,166	+4.09%
1946	1,784	−2.73%
1950	1,930	+1.99%
1964	1,785	−0.56%
1971	1,798	+0.10%
1981	1,619	−1.04%
1985	1,556	−0.99%
1989	1,511	−0.73%
1990	1,493	−1.19%
1991	1,473	−1.34%
1992	1,462	−0.75%
1993	1,468	+0.41%
1994	1,521	+3.61%
1995	1,612	+5.98%
1996	1,686	+4.59%

Year	Pop.	±% p.a.
1997	1,742	+3.32%
1998	1,780	+2.18%
1999	1,833	+2.98%
2000	1,867	+1.85%
2001	1,876	+0.48%
2002	1,892	+0.85%
2003	1,897	+0.26%
2004	1,880	−0.90%
2005	1,886	+0.32%
2006	1,929	+2.28%
2007	1,913	−0.83%
2008	1,957	+2.30%
2009	1,948	−0.46%
2010	1,948	+0.00%
2011	1,953	+0.26%
2012	1,964	+0.56%
2013	1,950	−0.71%
2014	1,979	+1.49%
2015	1,979	+0.00%
2016	1,984	+0.25%
