= Räuberberg =

Mountain in Tauche, Oder-Spree district, Brandenburg, Germany

Coordinates: 52°8′50.3″N 14°3′33.1″E

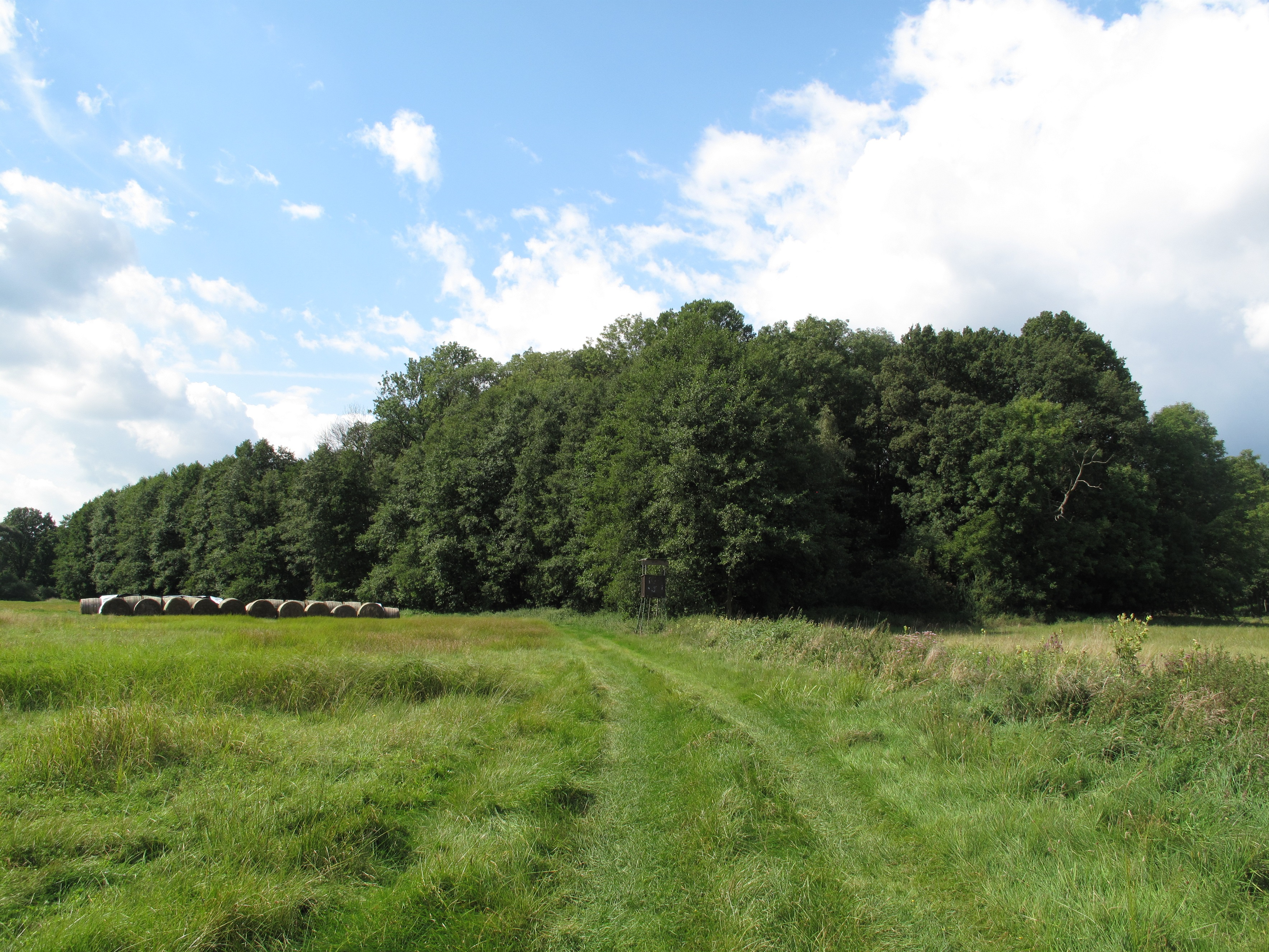
Talsand Island of the Räuberberg in the valley of the Blabbergraben

The Räuberberg is an archaeological monument, located in Görsdorf within the municipality of Tauche in the Oder-Spree district of Brandenburg, Germany.

The 58.1-meter high hill once housed a medieval noble castle, but there is no evidence of its existence besides the castle rampart and archaeological discoveries dating back to the 12th to 13th centuries. The castle is absent in any charters or documents from the Middle Ages. However, the Räuberberg is represented several times in the region's legends.

== Location and natural environment ==
The Räuberberg is situated in the western part of the Görsdorf district, northeast of Schwenow. Accessible only via forest paths, it is positioned within the channel of the Blabbergraben north of Lake Drobsch. Roughly 900 meters upstream from this site lies another ground monument, the Blabbermühle which lent its name to the ditch.

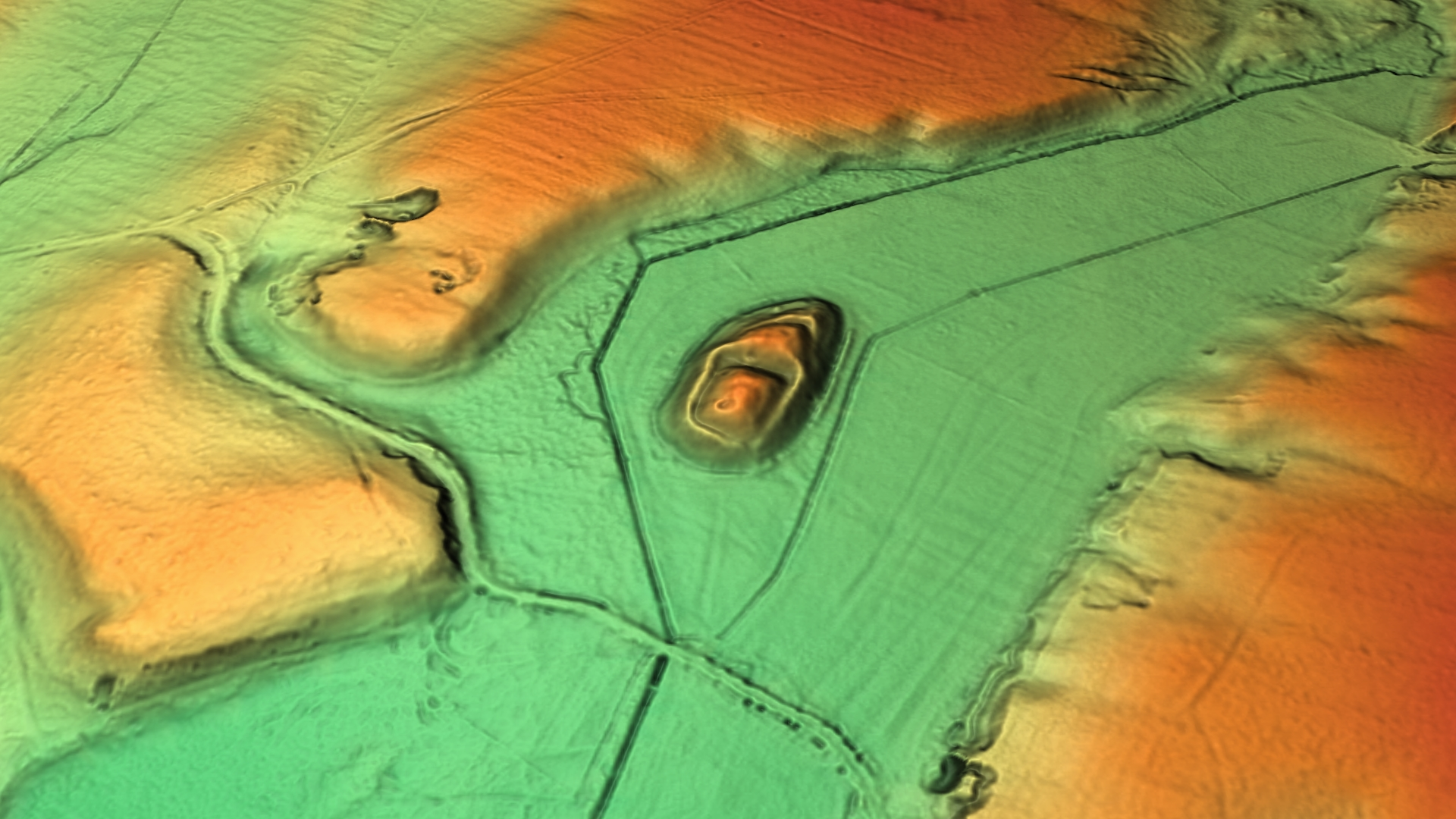
3D view of the digital terrain model

The 14-kilometer Blabbergraben connects and drains five elongated lakes located in the southwest of the Beeskow plate, running from north to south into the Krumme Spree between Werder and Kossenblatt. This plate is listed as No. 824 in the primary natural units of Germany, within the main unit group No. 82 East Brandenburg Heath and Lake District. The region's subsoil primarily consists of Saalian glacial ground moraines, largely covered by flat undulating terminal moraines from the last ice age. The sparsely populated area is part of an extensive forest region and is encompassed by the Schwenower Forst Nature Reserve, the Dahme-Heideseen Nature Park, and the Dahme-Heideseen landscape conservation area.

== Historical classification ==
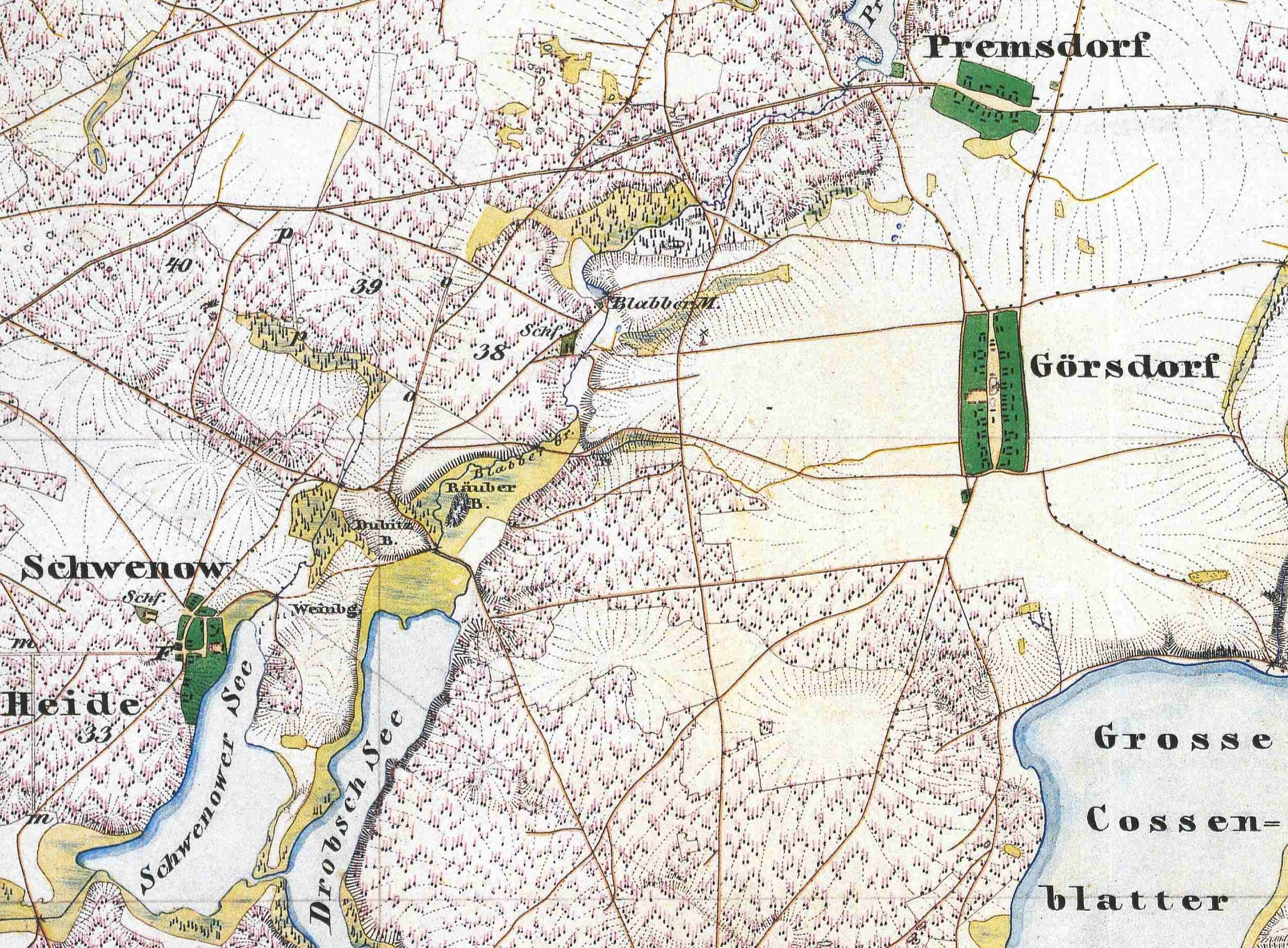
Region and Räuberberg in the Prussian premiere from 1846

The region, which was formerly Slavic, was settled in the 12th century during the German Eastern Settlement from Wettin. It later became part of the dominion of Beeskow in the Margraviate of Lusatia. Storkow, located on the northern border of Lusatia, and the focal point of the neighboring lordship of Storkow, was first documented in 1209. Storkow Castle was believed to have been built around 1150. The area and Storkow held significant strategic importance for the Wettin rulers in their efforts to integrate the territory into the Holy Roman Empire and safeguard its boundaries. If the castle on the Räuberberg dates to the 12th century, it would be among the oldest German fortifications from the period of eastern settlement around the present-day municipalities of Tauche and Rietz-Neuendorf. The nearby villages, judging by their earliest documentary mentions, were founded at varying times: Görsdorf in 1443, Premsdorf (a part of Görsdorf) in 1460, Limsdorf in 1393, Lindenberg in 1284, Schwenow in 1490, Kossenblatt in 1208, and Werder in 1376.

== The ground monument ==
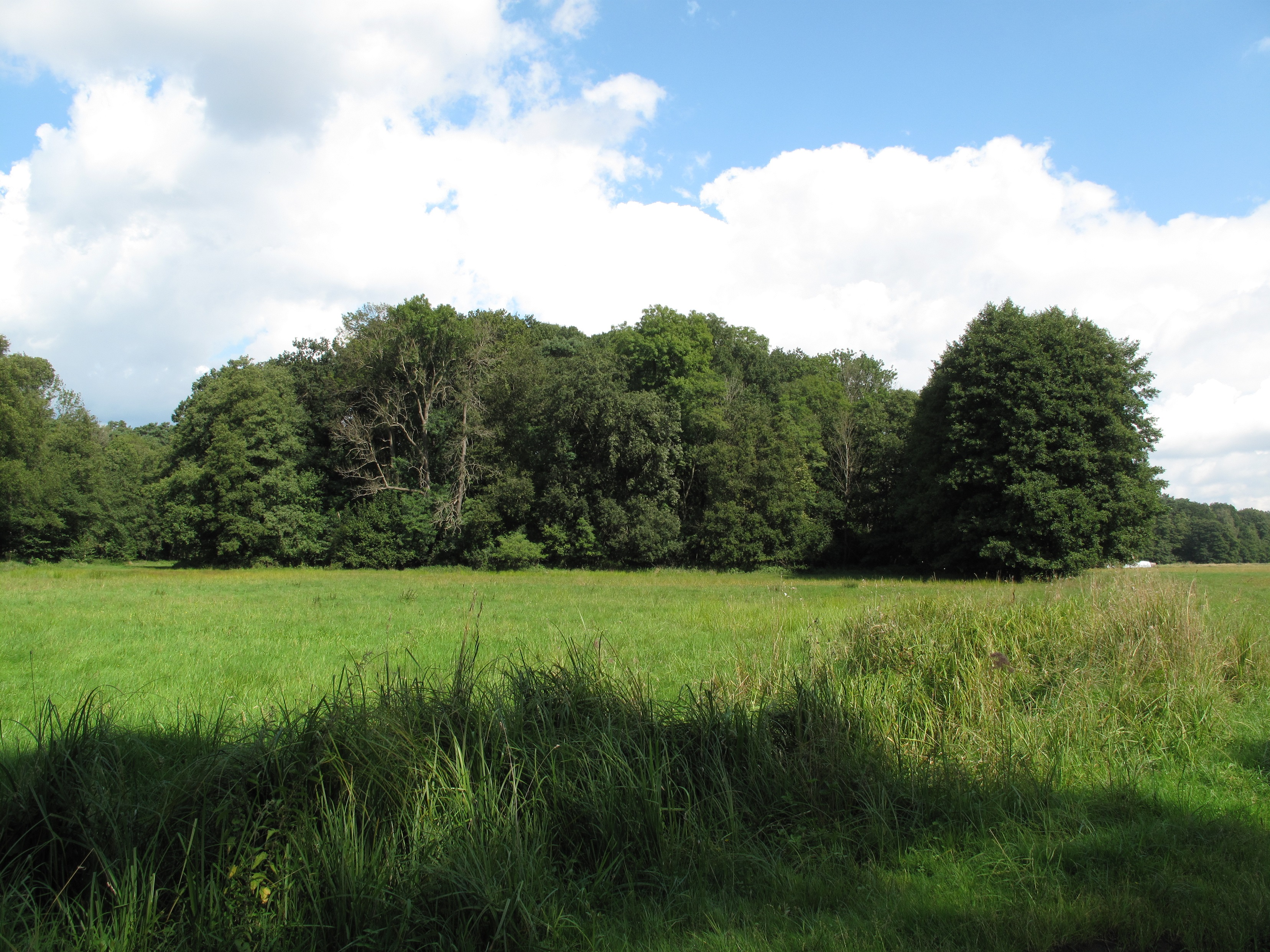
The Räuberberg in 2014

The Räuberberg is designated as a ground monument under the name Burg Deutsches Mittelalter. In the list of ground monuments, it is listed as number 90383 under "Görsdorf (B)". As described in the Historisches Ortslexikon, it is approximately 2.2 kilometers west-southwest of the Angerdorf Görsdorf. This location is marked by the remains of the castle rampart of a noble castle and various discoveries dating from the 12th to 13th centuries, found on a hill to the north of Lake Drobsch. While there were initial suppositions suggesting that it might have originated as a Slavic castle rampart or served as a Slavic princely seat, these conjectures have not been substantiated.

=== Description ===
The Räuberberg, standing at a height of 58.1 meters, is an elevated area in the lowlands of the Blabbergraben and rises approximately 18 meters above the adjacent ground level. The Blabbergraben flows in a curved course surrounding the remnants of the fortifications, which comprise plateaus, ramparts, and ditches on the eastern side. According to historical records from Leopold von Ledebur dating to 1852, the hill was encircled by a moat. The surrounding open, moist meadows and watercourses offered inherent protection for the castle.

The castle was built on a naturally occurring, two-part hill that measures approximately 160 meters in length and 80 meters in width. The hilltops are enclosed by both ramparts and ditches and are covered in mixed forest. The former core castle was probably located in the area of the almost rectangular plateau on the south side. Three excavations uncovered a cultural layer resting on a meticulously placed fieldstone pavement, as reported by Martin Petzel from the Brandenburg State Office for the Preservation of Monuments and Archaeological State Museum.

=== Archaeological finds ===
The following finds came from the outcrop of the cultural layer:

- Horse and wild boar bones
- Various iron arrowheads
- Nails and a pair of scissors
- Clay from huts, broken bricks, and above all
- Ceramics from the 13th century
- Vessels made of hard gray ware and Upper Lusatian sand-bottom pottery from the 13th and 14th centuries.

The 13th-century thin-walled pottery is crafted from finely slurried grey clay with strapwork. It is classified as a transitional form from late Slavic to early Germanic. No longer mentioned in this list by Petzold from 2005 is a strong iron chain which, according to Ledebur, was found on boggy ground at the end of the 18th century and was thought to be part of a former drawbridge (see below).

=== Historical descriptions ===
The hill, likely named Räuberberg in a 1704 cadastral map of the Görsdorf district, drew the attention of archaeologists in the mid-19th century. In 1852, Leopold Freiherr von Ledebur provided its first known description. Rudolf Virchow, a pathologist, and politician who excelled in anthropology, ethnology, and archaeology, visited Räuberberg during the latter half of the 1800s. He was the first to differentiate between Slavic (Burgwall type) and Bronze Age pottery (Lusatian type), which subsequently supported Burgwall research. Virchow only gave the mound a superficial examination and refrained from excavation due to the strong root system. In 1888, physician Robert Behla, one of the co-founders of the Niederlausitzer Gesellschaft für Anthropologie und Urgeschichte (Lower Lusatian Society for Anthropology and Prehistory), described the rampart in his work, Die vorgeschichtlichen Rundwälle im östlichen Deutschland. Hermann Busse, according to the local museum in Woltersdorf, reported on the Räuberberg in the Zeitschrift für Ethnologie in 1896. In 1933, Walter Dinger stated in the Beeskow-Storkow district calendar that there were no finds available to shed light on the rampart's settlement age and type, to the best of his knowledge.

==== Ledebur (1852) ====
In 1852, Leopold Freiherr von Ledebur, a historian, aristocratic researcher, and heraldist, documented the Räuberberg in his work Die heidnischen Alterthümer des Regierungsbezirks Potsdam. He entered it under Kossenblatt:

"In the valley of the small Fliesses, called the Blabber between here and Schwenow, a hill is called the Räuberberg (cf. Görsdorf), on which iron arrowheads have been found in recent times."

This was followed in more detail on the same page under Görsdorf:

"In a meadow valley north of Lake Drobsch lies the so-called Räuberberg. Its circumference is 500 paces at the foot and it is surrounded by a still visible ditch. Its height is 70 to 80 feet. The summit, at a height of 40 to 50', is 100' long and 60' wide. The summit of the mountain is divided into two unequal parts by a deep cut, the southern part of which is 60' from south to north and 70 to 80' from north to west, while the northern part is 40' from north to south and 70 to 80' from north to west. According to the owners, there are traces of masonry inside the mountain, which is now overgrown with undergrowth, and at the end of the last century a strong iron chain is said to have been found at the foot of the mountain on boggy ground, which was considered to be the remains of a drawbridge that once existed here."

— Leopold Freiherr von Ledebur, The pagan antiquities of the Potsdam administrative district., p.84

==== Busse (1896) ====
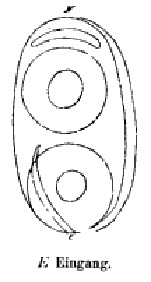
Sketch by Hermann Busse from 1896

Hermann Busse (1847-1921) became known for his prehistoric excavations and worked for a time on behalf of the Märkisches Museum and as its district curator. In 1896, the Zeitschrift für Ethnologie wrote: Mr. Hermann Busse makes the following announcements, presenting the findings: [...]. Communication No. 3, to which Busse added the sketch of the castle rampart shown on the right, was entitled Der Burgwall oder Räuberberg bei Görsdorf, Kreis Beeskow-Storkow.

Busse acquired an iron ball with a 4 cm diameter from Ahrensdorf, which was allegedly from the rampart. However, he had doubts about its authenticity. In addition, he mentioned Ledebur's report and reproduced Behla's statement that the rampart had a circumference of 500 steps, a height of 70 to 80', and a ditch at a height of 40-50'. The finds that Busse presented, according to the editors of the journal, came from a Germanic urn field on the nearby Lüttkenbergen near Wulfersdorf, from which colossal masses of stones had been removed, under which the vessels were located. He was not aware of any other finds.

== Legends about the Räuberberg ==
=== The Lüttchen from Räuberberg ===
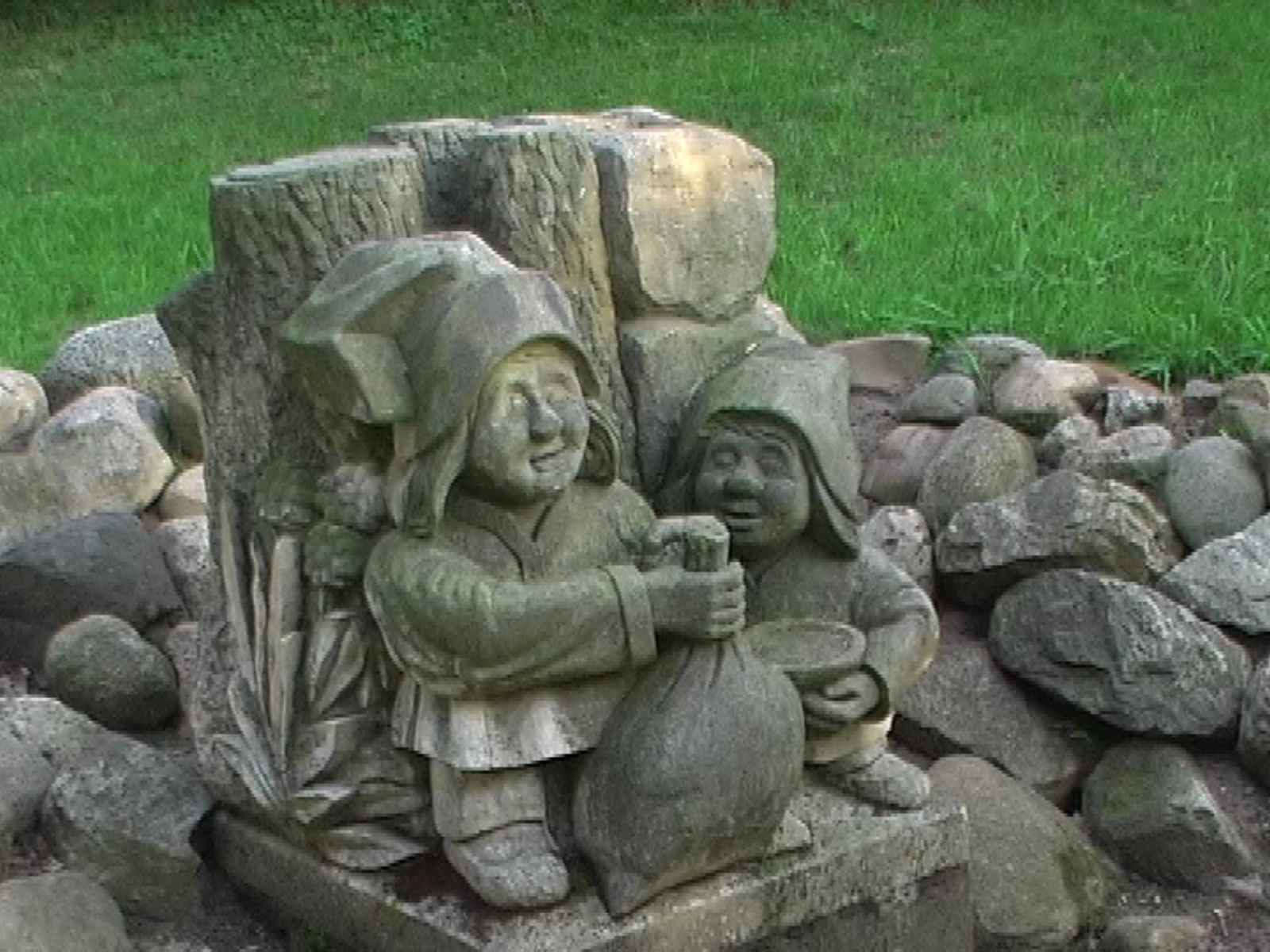
Sculpture of Lutken in Burg (Spreewald)

The Lüttkenberge mountains mentioned by Busse, like many other hills in the region such as near Lindenberg, were named after the Lusatian legend about the dwarves of the Lutken, who mostly lived in the earth and were called Lutchen, Lüttjen, Lütken or Lüttken in the Mark Brandenburg. According to legend, the Räuberberg was also the home of the little people, who are said to have been mostly friendly to the people. People in the neighboring villages told stories about the castle that the little people lived in and in the mountains. The Lüttchen were very sensitive to noise and with the arrival of Christianity, they emigrated, frightened by the sound of church bells. According to another account, the Lüttchen left the Räuberberg when curious people observed them. They have not been seen since.

=== Shrub knights or robber barons as namesakes ===
Another legend explains the origin of the name Räuberberg in relation to a group of robbers who inhabited the mountain and frequently attacked people who traveled from Schwenow, Werder, and Limsdorf to Kossenblatt to buy goods. It is said that a concealed rope was stretched across a narrow road between Lake Drobsch and the Räuberberg swamp to trap unsuspecting victims. If anyone stumbled upon it, a bell would ring, signaling the highwaymen to attack and rob the travelers. This is why the hill was given the name Räuberberg (Robbers' Hill). In addition, the robbers once captured a young girl and dragged her into their cave. She worked for them for a year, cooking, baking, washing, and mending, but was treated cruelly and never received any kindness. Eventually, she escaped. Legend has it that there is a treasure hidden on the hill, guarded by two black dogs.

Günter de Bruyn, the author, believes that the legend may contain a historical foundation, as robber barons may have utilized the fortification dating back to early German times amid the political confusion of the 14th century.

== Nature conservation and flora ==
=== Former natural monument ===
The Räuberberg was designated as a natural monument in 1938 under Section 3 of the Reich Nature Conservation Act (RNG), with the protected status being reaffirmed in 1950 by the then district of Beeskow-Storkow. A 2006 article by the Dahme-Heideseen Nature Park Administration recognized the Räuberberg as a natural monument and a land monument. However, it is no longer listed as a natural monument in the Oder-Spree district. The draft for the expiration of the 2013 ordinance on natural landmarks in the Oder-Spree district indicates that the protected status of Räuberberg has been revoked. This is due to Räuberberg being already protected as a ground monument and as part of the Schwenower Forst nature reserve.

=== Flora ===
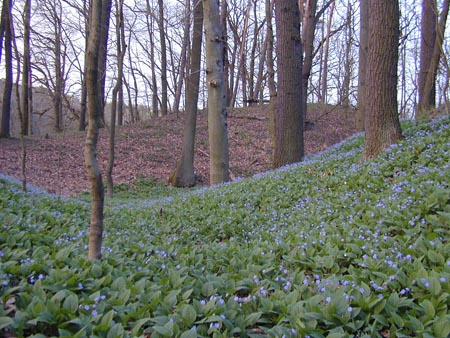
Spring memorial on the Räuberberg

The Schwenower Forst nature reserve is part of the cohesive European ecological network called Natura 2000, which aims to conserve special areas. The profile of the Bundesamtes für Naturschutz (BfN) (Federal Agency for Nature Conservation) characterizes the 746-hectare FFH area under the number 3850-301.

Oaks, pines, and hornbeams comprise the canopy of Räuberberg. Meadow cowslip and wood anemones grow on the ground, while sweet grass family's wood twig forms dense clumps. In springtime, the hollow between the two mounds is covered with two large colorful carpets of sky-blue petals of spring meadow grass. This neophyte, which has been naturalized in Germany, was mainly planted in gardens and landscape parks as ground cover and path edging during the Romantic period. The substantial presence on Talsand Island is most likely the result of plantings by landowner and forester Carl Starnitzky, who died in 1814 and had his beloved dogs buried on Räuberberg.
