= Marsh castle =

Lowland castle in boggy terrain

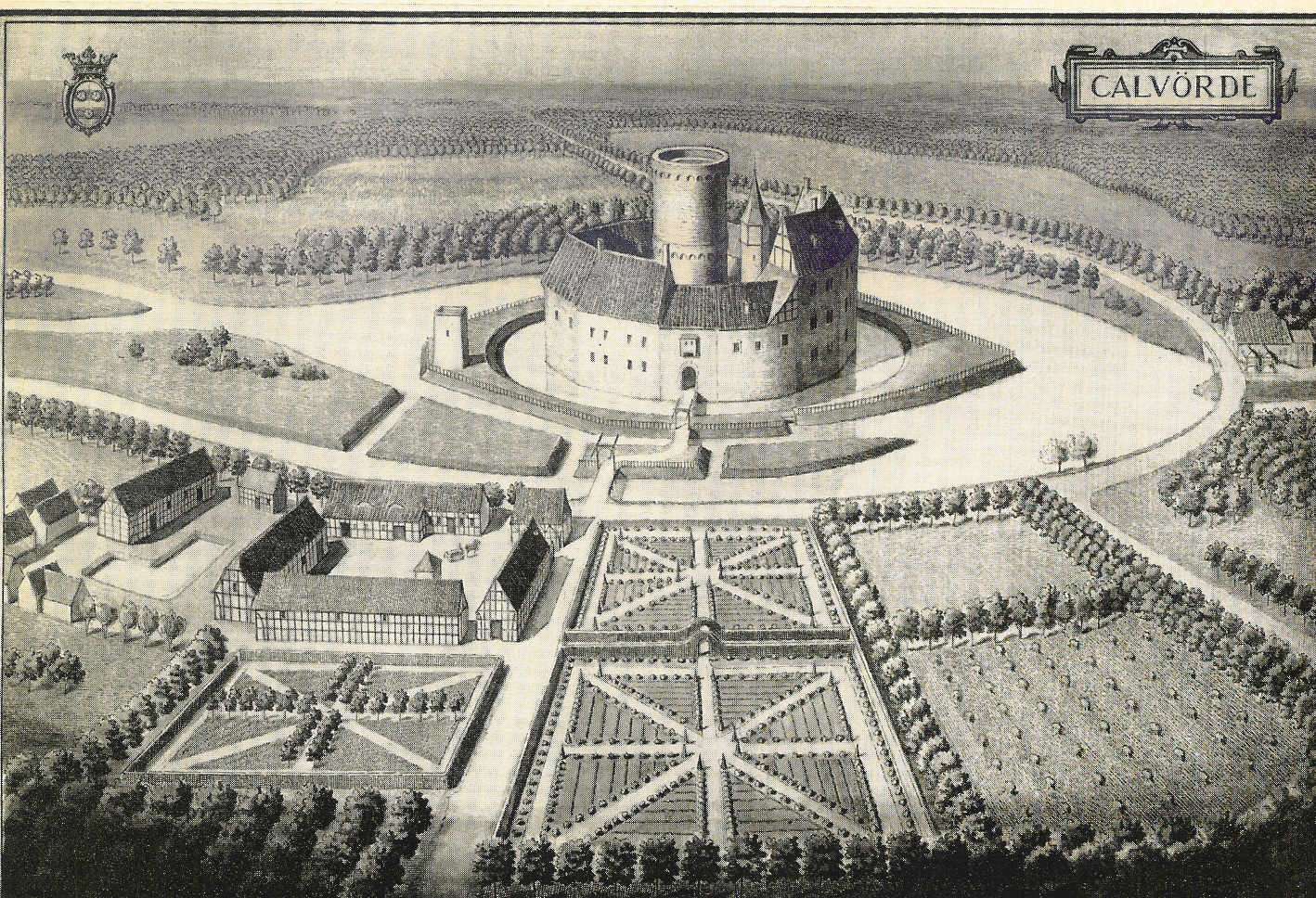
Calvörde Castle, a marsh castle, depicted around 1600

A marsh or marshland castle (German: Sumpfburg) is a type of lowland castle that is situated in marshy or boggy countryside. It uses the natural inaccessibility of the terrain to its defensive advantage.

In contrast to a moated castle, with a marsh castle, an area of marsh or bog was used or incorporated as an obstacle to the approach. Marsh castles were mostly built on mounds within these landscapes, in a similar way to a Wallburg. In some places, however, an adjacent area of marsh or bog was simply used for protection on one or more sides and the castle itself was built on solid land, as was the case with the first castle in Danzig (modern Gdansk), for example. Most castles of this type were built in the lowlands of rivers flowing into the East and North Sea between Lower Saxony and Mecklenburg.

Marsh castles are historically one of the oldest types of castle and were built as early as the Early Middle Ages by the Slavic peoples in the aforementioned areas. The distinction between them and moated castles is fluid.

According to Swiss historians, a marsh castle can be defined in the broadest sense as a complex whose outer defences are built up by exploiting natural obstacles, such as meandering river courses, marshes and bogs, as protection or which are built on mounds entirely within these obstacles. Thus a marsh castle can also be described as a moated castle protected by a natural waterbody.

Examples of well-known marsh castles in Germany include:

- Weferlingen Castle, a ruined castle in Oebisfelde in the state of Saxony-Anhalt.
- Oebisfelde Castle, the oldest surviving marsh castle in Germany, also situated in Oebisfelde-Weferlingen in Saxony-Anhalt.
- Storkow Castle, in Storkow the state of Brandenburg.
- Calvörde Castle, in Calvörde in the state of Saxony-Anhalt.
- Süpplingenburg Castle, where Lothair III, Duke of Saxony, later Emperor of the Roman-German Empire grew up.
- Predecessor castle to Harburger Schloss
- The fortified village of Altenburg in Hanau was designated by Karl August von Cohausen as a marsh castle.
