= Tauche =

- Municipality
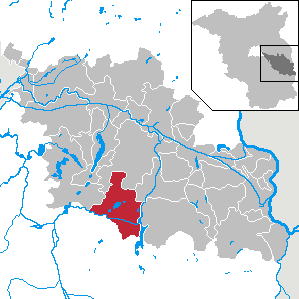
- Location of Tauche within Oder-Spree district
- Interactive map of Tauche
- Location within Germany Location within Brandenburg
- Coordinates: 52°07′00″N 14°07′00″E
- Country: Germany
- State: Brandenburg
- District: Oder-Spree
- Subdivisions: 12 districts

Government
  - Mayor (2021–29): Stephanie Erdmann

Area
  - Total: 121.6 km^{2} (47.0 sq mi)
- Elevation: 53 m (174 ft)

Population (2025-12-31)
  - Total: 3,667
  - Density: 30.16/km^{2} (78.10/sq mi)
- Time zone: UTC+01:00 (CET)
  - Summer (DST): UTC+02:00 (CEST)
- Postal codes: 15848
- Dialling codes: 033675
- Vehicle registration: LOS
- Website: www.gemeinde-tauche.de

Tauche (German pronunciation: [ˈtaʊxə]; Lower Sorbian: Tuchow) is a municipality on both sides of the river Spree in the Oder-Spree district, in Brandenburg, Germany. The large municipality consists of 12 parts (German: Ortsteile) or villages with other local parts/settlements, respectively. The seat of the municipal administration is located in the village of the same name.

In 1813, explorer of Australia and naturalist, Ludwig Leichhardt, was born in the hamlet of Sabrodt near Trebatsch. That made, in 1998, the federal state of Brandenburg award the village of Trebatsch the additional name "Leichhardt-Gemeinde" (Leichhardt Municipality).

Author Günter de Bruyn has been living since 1969 in Görsdorf. In Kossenblatt there is a castle, Schloss Kossenblatt, which is said to have been the favourite palace of the "Soldier King" Frederick William I of Prussia.

== Division of the municipality ==
Tauche consists of the following districts (German: Ortsteile):

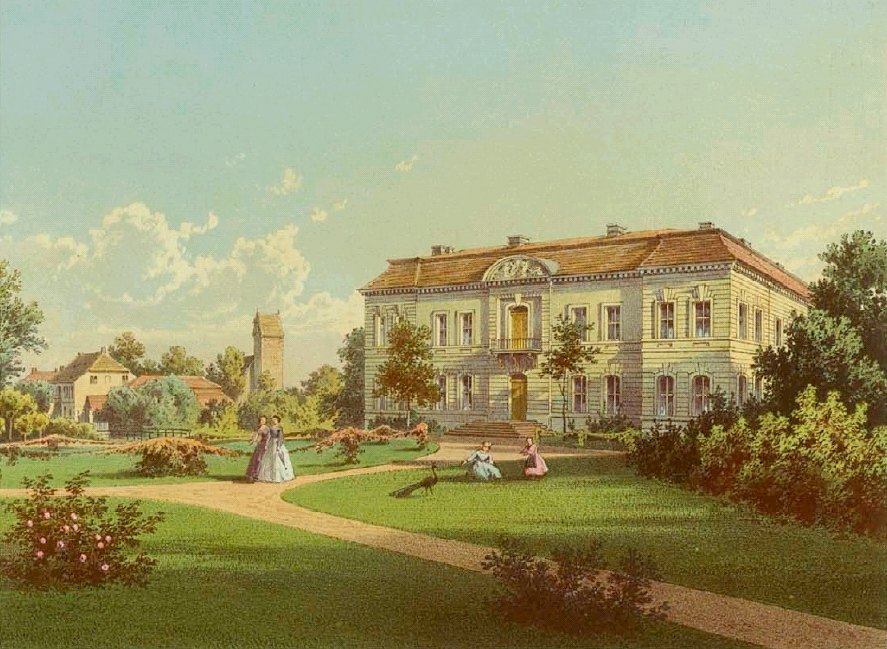
Castle of Kossenblatt between 1857 and 1883

- Briescht (Lower Sorbian Brěšc), including the local place Schwarzer Kater
- Falkenberg (Sokolnica)
- Giesensdorf (Gižojce), including the village Wulfersdorf
- Görsdorf (Górice), including the village Premsdorf (Pśemysłojce) and the local place Blabber
- Kossenblatt (Kósomłot)
- Lindenberg
- Mittweide
- Ranzig (Rańšyk)
- Stremmen (Tšumjeń)
- Tauche (Tuchow)
- Trebatsch (Žrobolce), including the villages Rocher (Rochow), Sabrodt (Zabrod) and Sawall (Zawal)
- Werder/Spree (Łucka)

== History ==
From 1815 to 1947, Tauche was part of the Prussian Province of Brandenburg.

After World War II, Tauche was incorporated into the State of Brandenburg from 1947 to 1952 and the Bezirk Frankfurt of East Germany from 1952 to 1990. Since 1990, Tauche is again part of Brandenburg.

== Demography ==
Development of population since 1875 within the current Boundaries (Blue Line: Population; Dotted Line: Comparison to Population development in Brandenburg state; Grey Background: Time of Nazi Germany; Red Background: Time of communist East Germany)

Recent Population Development and Projections (Population Development before Census 2011 (blue line); Recent Population Development according to the Census in Germany in 2011 (blue bordered line); Official projections for 2005-2030 (yellow line); for 2017-2030 (scarlet line); for 2020-2030 (green line)

Tauche: Population development
within the current boundaries (2020)

Year	Pop.	±% p.a.
1875	4,235	—
1890	4,113	−0.19%
1910	4,211	+0.12%
1925	4,391	+0.28%
1939	4,576	+0.30%
1950	5,864	+2.28%
1964	4,801	−1.42%

Year	Pop.	±% p.a.
1971	4,930	+0.38%
1981	4,506	−0.90%
1985	4,517	+0.06%
1990	4,400	−0.52%
1995	4,378	−0.10%
2000	4,295	−0.38%
2005	4,043	−1.20%

Year	Pop.	±% p.a.
2010	3,881	−0.81%
2015	3,875	−0.03%
2016	3,872	−0.08%
2017	3,816	−1.45%
2018	3,820	+0.10%
2019	3,809	−0.29%
2020	3,789	−0.53%

== See also ==
- Falkenberg Mast
- Räuberberg (Görsdorf)
