= Storkow Castle =

Castle in Brandenburg, Germany

- Burg Storkow
- Storkow
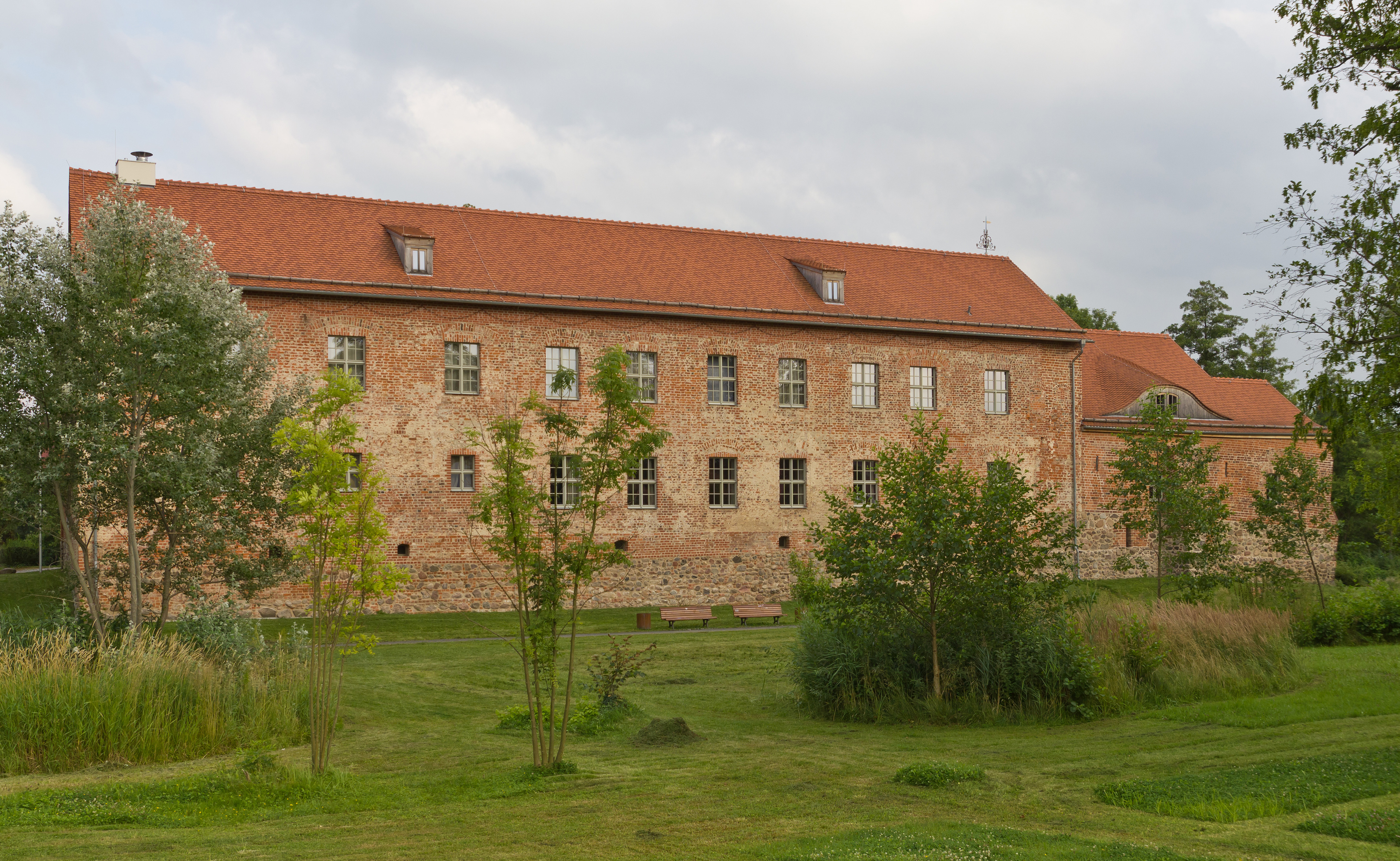
- West side of the castle (2013)

Site information
- Type: lowland castle and settlement
- Code: DE-BB
- Condition: largely preserved

Location
- Location within Brandenburg Location within Germany
- Coordinates: 52°15′10″N 13°56′00″E

Site history
- Built: Mid-12th century

Garrison information
- Occupants: nobility

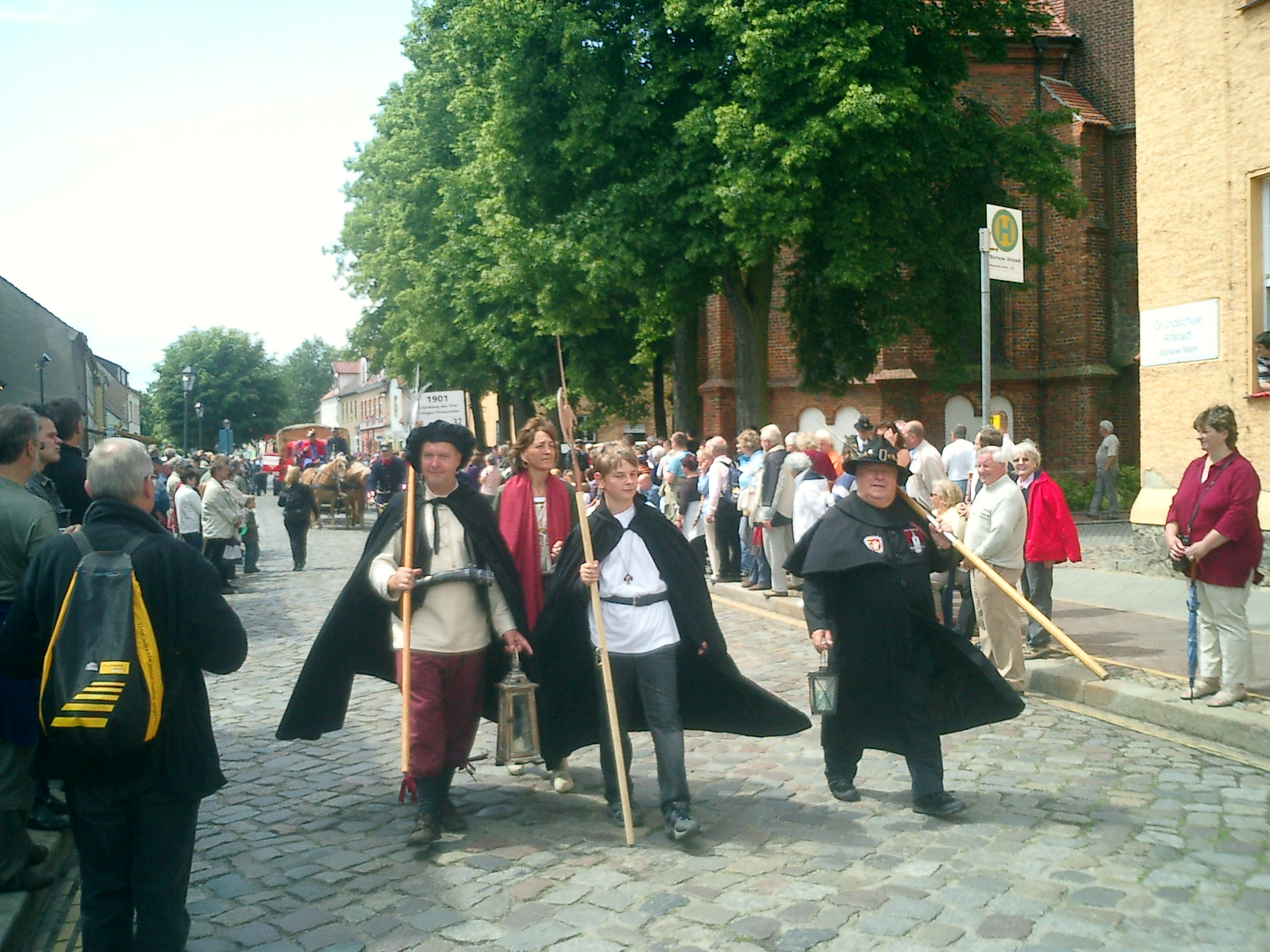
Historical pageant on the occasion of the 800 anniversary of the castle

Storkow Castle (German: Burg Storkow) is a medieval castle in the small town of Storkow in the district of Oder-Spree in the German state of Brandenburg.

== History ==
The castle would have been built in the mid-12th century during German settlement – probably on the site of a Slavic marsh castle. Its builder is likely to have been Margrave Conrad I of Meißen. The castle is first mentioned in 1209.

Until 1382 the lords of Strehla were resident at the castle. They were succeeded by the lords of Bieberstein. In 1518 Ulrich of Bieberstein enfeoffed the castle to the Bishop of Lebus, Dietrich of Bülow. The castle was then expanded into an episcopal Residenz.

In 1538, Stefan Meiße, a friend and comrade-in-arms of Hans Kohlhase, was tortured to death at the castle. In 1555 the last Roman Catholic bishop of Lebus, John VIII of Horneburg (1551 – 1555), died here. In 1556 the castle and lordship went to Margrave John of Brandenburg-Küstrin. After his death the castle and estate finally ended up in the possession of the electors of Brandenburg.

In 1627, during the Thirty Years' War, the castle was badly damaged It was rebuilt as a small Renaissance residence, but suffered more damage, this time by fire, in 1775.

In 1910, the architect Johann Emil Schaudt bought the site and had it remodelled in a Romanesque historic style. Between 1934 and 1945, it was used as a Hitler Youth centre (a Jugendburg). From 1945 to 1978, municipal offices were housed in the castle.

In 1978 the site was destroyed by a major fire. Between 2000 and 2009 the building was gradually rebuilt. The re-inauguration of the castle took place at Pentecost in 2009 as part of the 800th anniversary celebrations of the town of Storkow.

Since May 2009 the visitor information centre for the Dahme-Heideseen Nature Park has been located at Storkow Castle. In addition to the permanent exhibition entitled "People and Nature - a Journey Through Time" about the nature and environment in the nature park, there are also changing exhibitions.

== Gallery ==
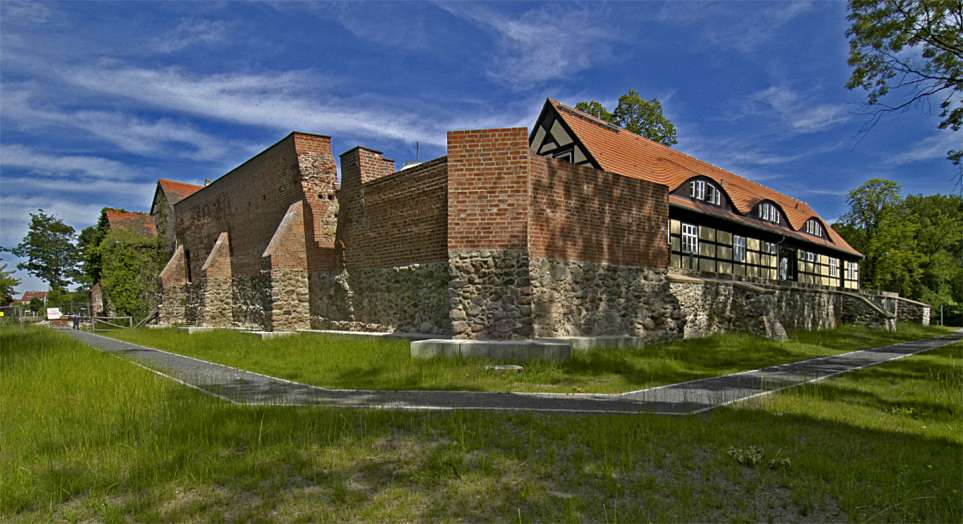
View of the whole castle

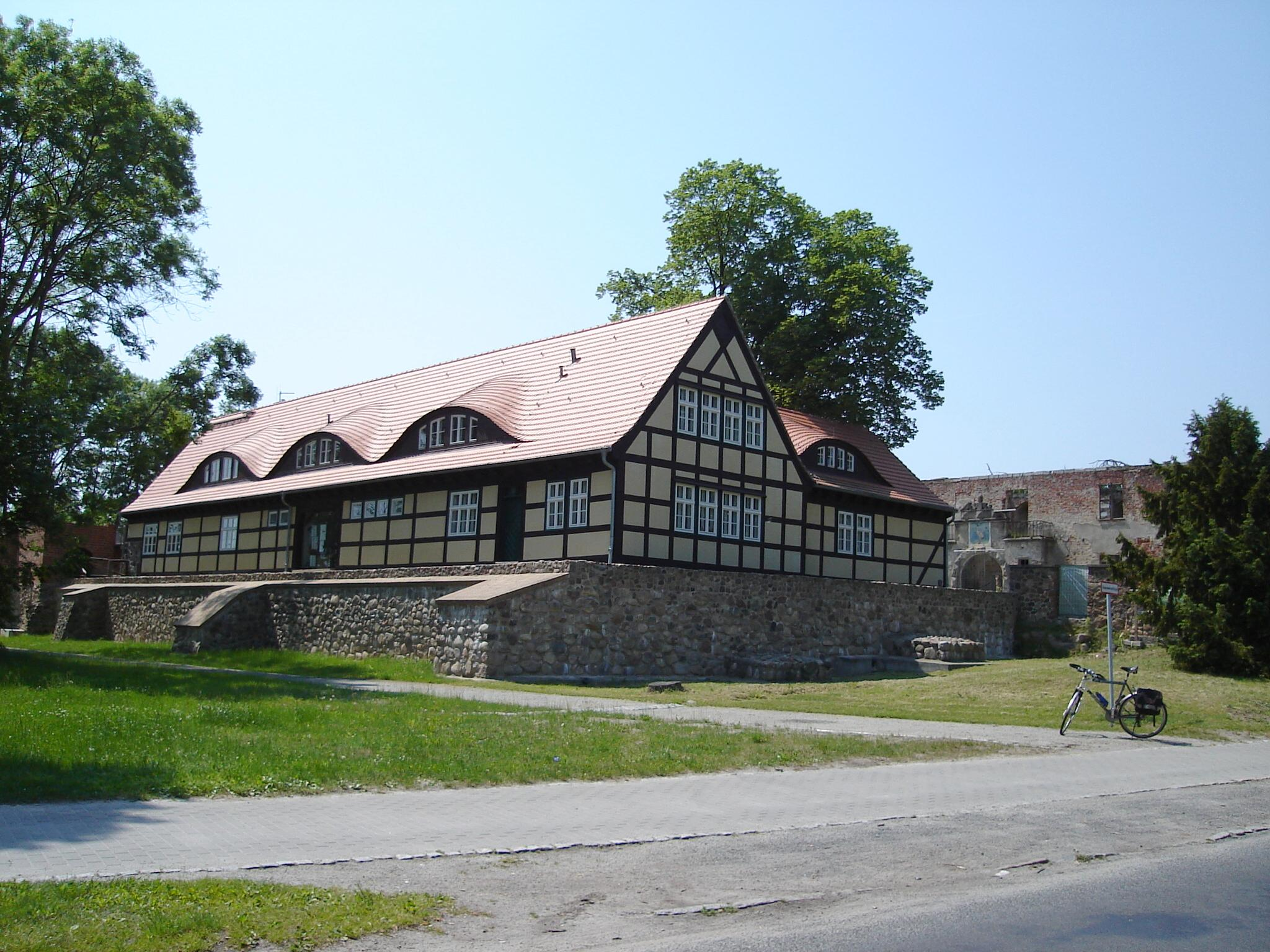
View from the northwest

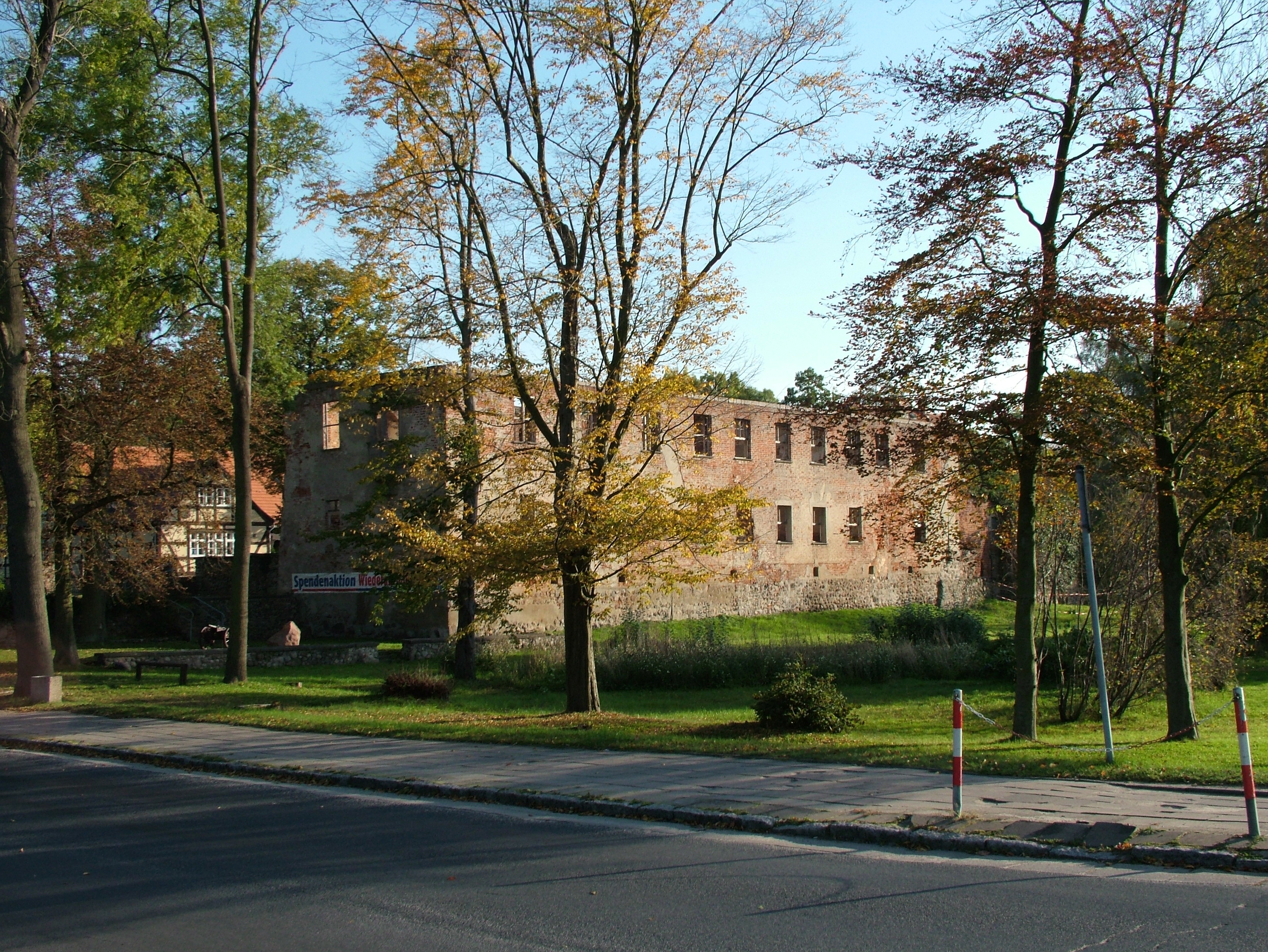
The west side before restoration (2005)

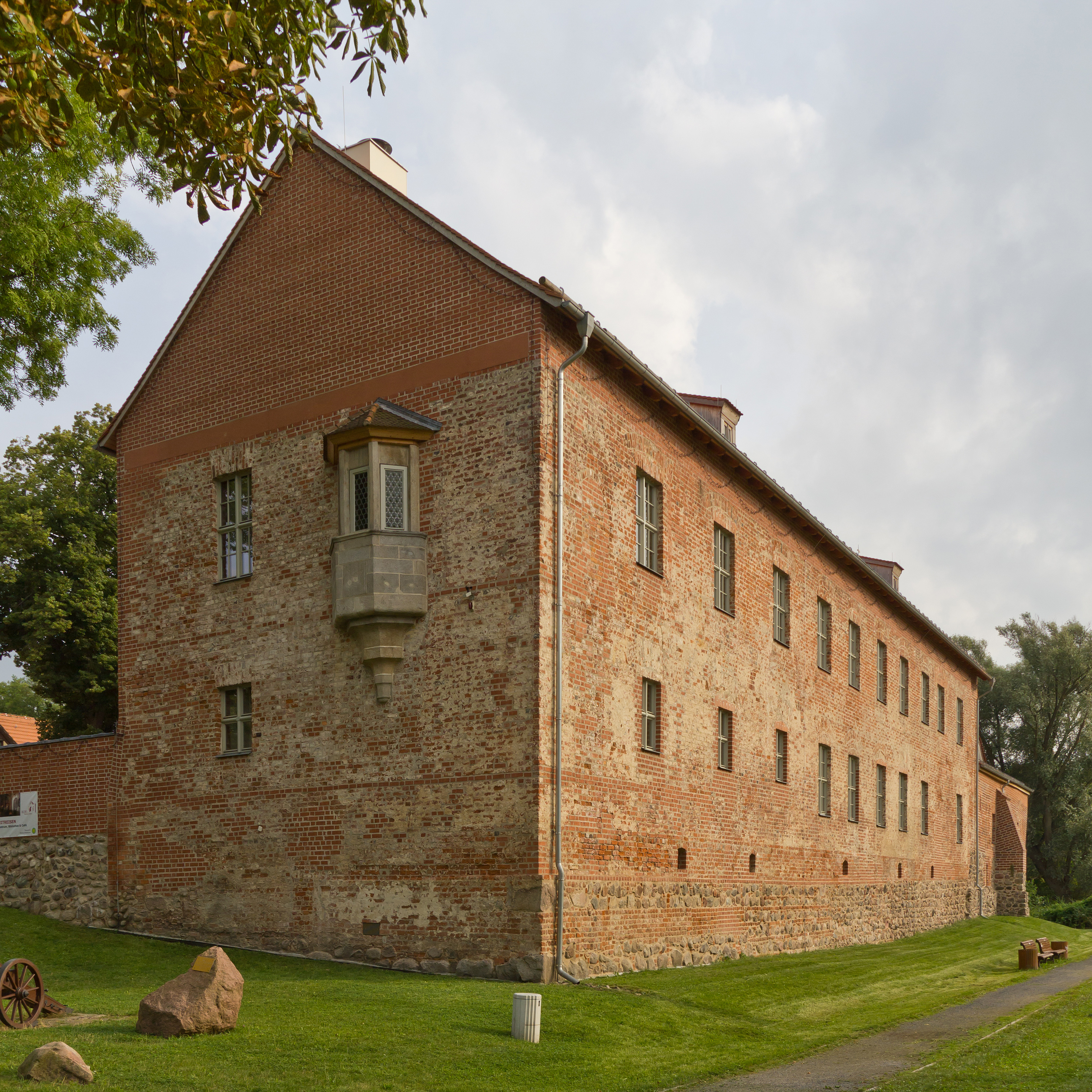
Building with oriel on the west side (2013)

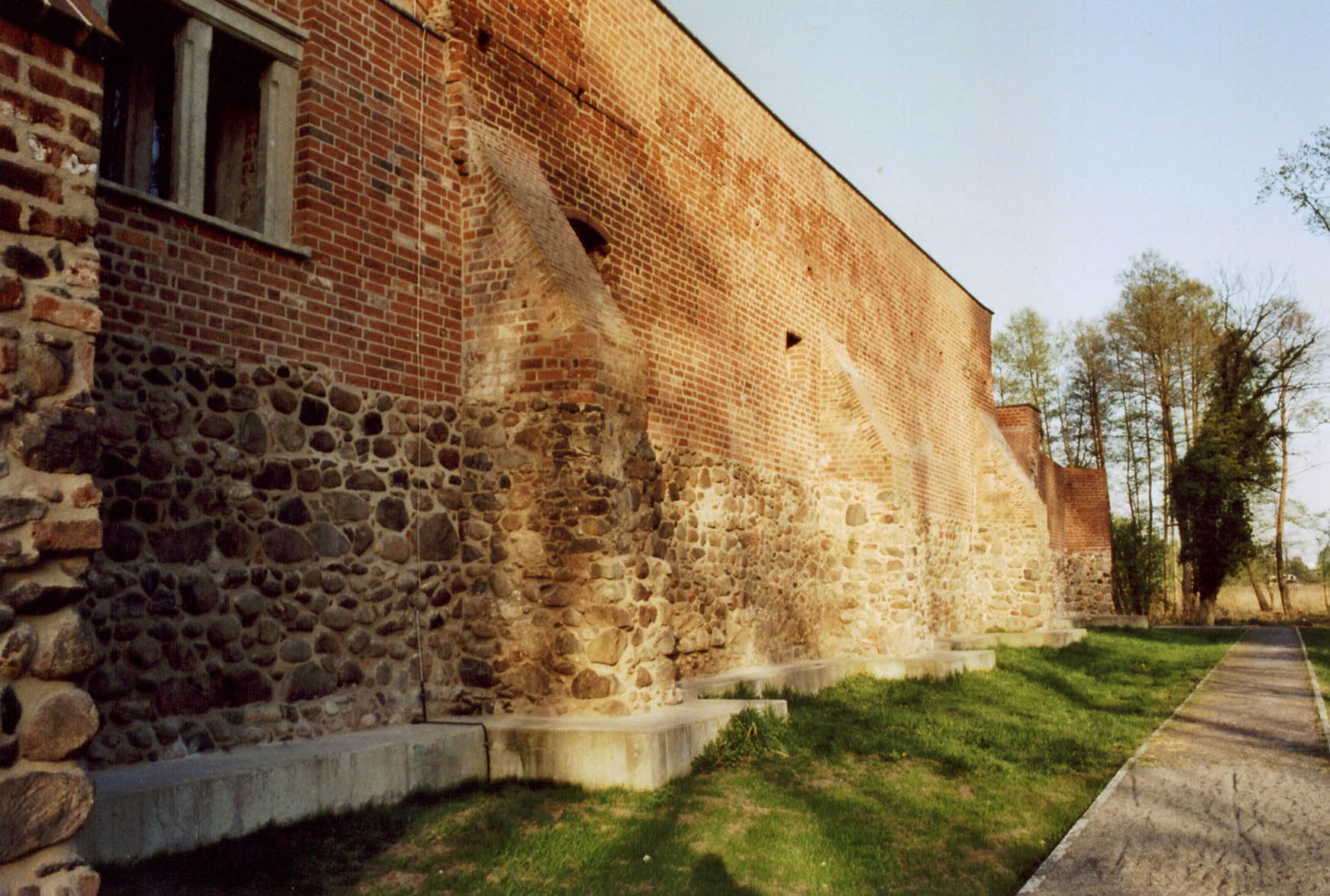
Wall on the south side (2009)

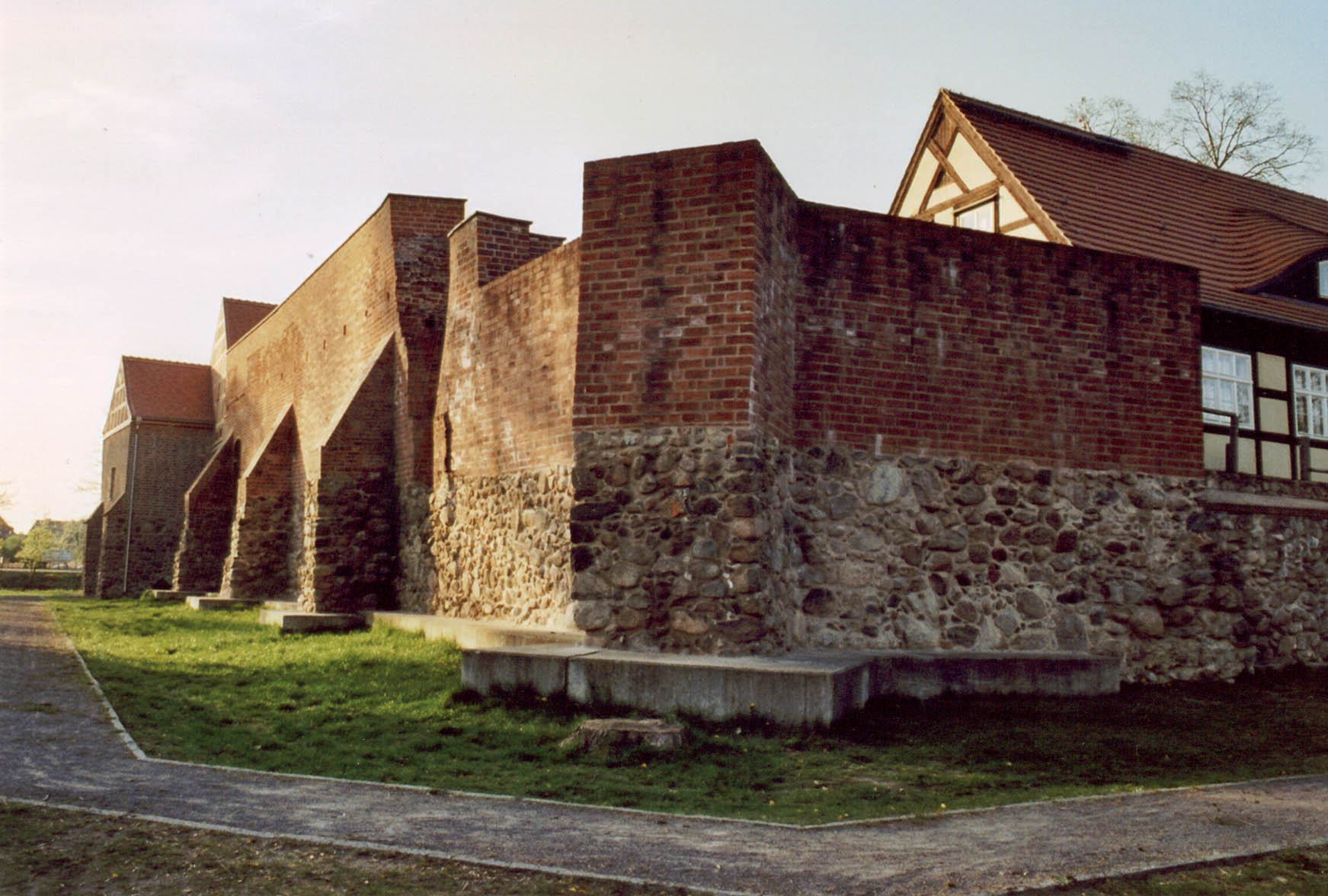
Wall at the southeast corner (2009)

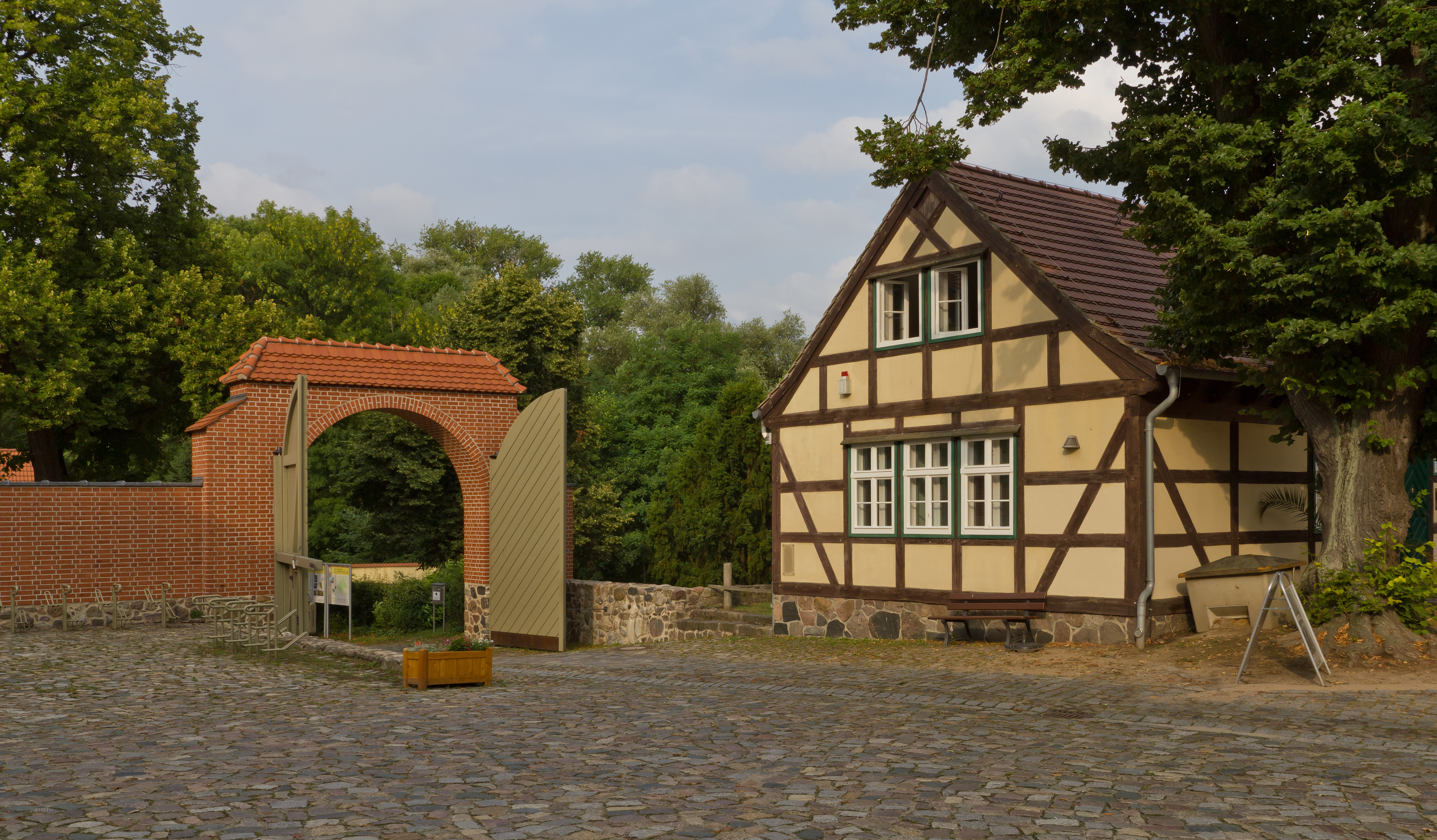
Building on the east side (2013)

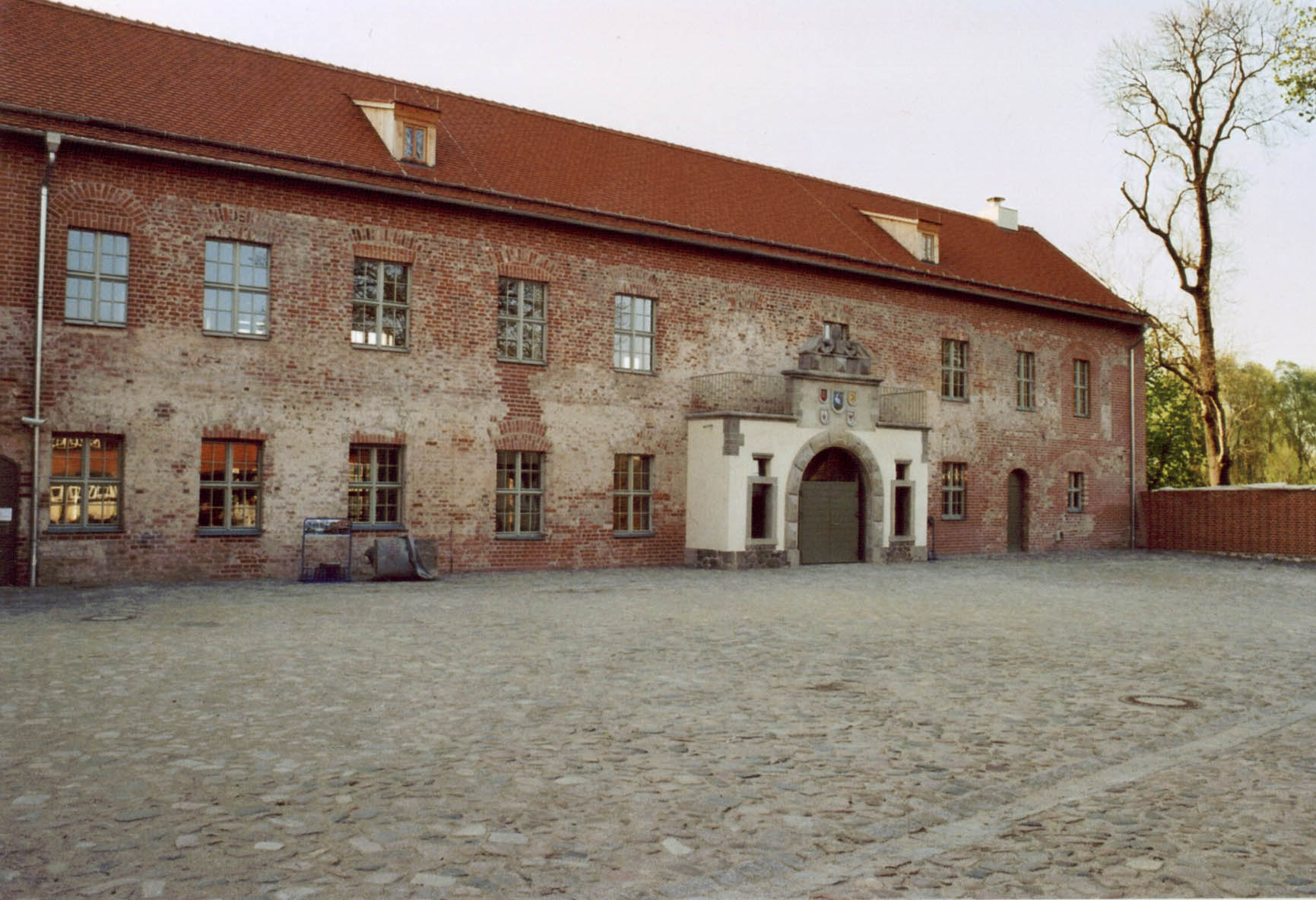
West side of the courtyard (2009)

== Literature ==
- Handbuch der historischen Stätten (Band X) (in German), ISBN 3-520-31101-1
- Jo Lüdemann, Burgenführer Brandenburg (in German), ISBN 3-89794-006-X
