= Calvörde Castle =

Castle in Saxony-Anhalt, Germany

- Burg Calvörde
- Calvörde
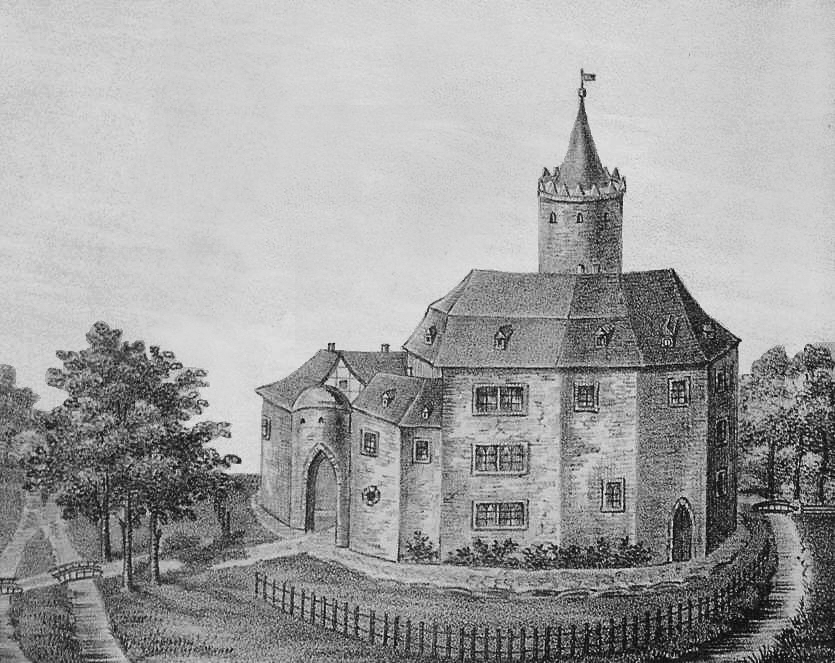
- Calvörde Castle - print from Görges

Site information
- Type: lowland castle
- Code: DE-ST
- Condition: remnants of walls and buildings

Location
- Coordinates: 52°23′46″N 11°18′24″E
- Height: 52 m above sea level (NN)

Site history
- Built: um 786
- Materials: fieldstone, brick

Garrison information
- Occupants: nobility

Calvörde Castle (German: Burg Calvörde) is located in Calvörde in the German state of Saxony-Anhalt. Its existence was first recorded in the late 13th century. In the Late Middle Ages and Early Modern Period it was frequently fought over due to its location between the territories of Brandenburg, Magdeburg and Brunswick.

== Strategic location ==
In the areas of the Upper Aller and Ohre rivers, the former medieval principalities of Lüneburg, Altmark, Brunswick, Magdeburg and Halberstadt bordered one another and, in some cases, were even geographically enmeshed.

Several noble families made a name for themselves in the area including the Bartenslebens, Alvenslebens and von Schulenburgs. They played an important role as result of their position on either side of these borders. They owned large feudal estates which helped to give them considerable independence for long periods of time. Calvörde formed a key strongpoint in this regard because it lay at the southern end of the formerly impassable marshy forests of the Drömling at a point that used to be the key crossing of the Ohre river that on the road from Brunswick to the southern Altmark.

== History ==
Calvörde originally belonged to the counts of Hillersleben, from whom it was inherited by the counts of Regenstein in the Harz mountains. For a long time Brandenburg, Magdeburg and Brunswick fought for the place against the Welf dukes. The little town, along with several nearby villages, belonged to the castle and formed a Brunswick exclave in what later became Prussian territory. Presumably through a marriage to the inheriting daughter of the von Wederde family, that died out before 1404 and had been the feudal tenants (Pfandherren) at Calvörde, the barony went to the Alvenslebens of Rogätz Castle. Their two estates in Calvörde and Rogätz complicated the ownership situation. The castellans (Burgherren) often acted as senior advisors (Geheime Räte) to their landlords. In 1542 the Schulenburgs succeeded the Alvenslebens as feudal tenants. In 1571, the House of Brunswick-Wolfenbüttel redeemed the barony again in order to manage it subsequently as an Amt. From 1608 to 1615, Duke Joachim Charles had his court at the castle, becoming a benefactor to the market town of Calvörde. Although the castle had been expanded into a fortress in the 17th century, it fell into ruins not long thereafter.

== Artist's impression ==
The former appearance of the castle has been preserved in two drawings. These are a Merian copperplate and an even older sketch that is now in the Fatherland Museum of Brunswick (Vaterländischen Museum Braunschweig) and has been supplements by plans in the Wolfenbüttel state archives.

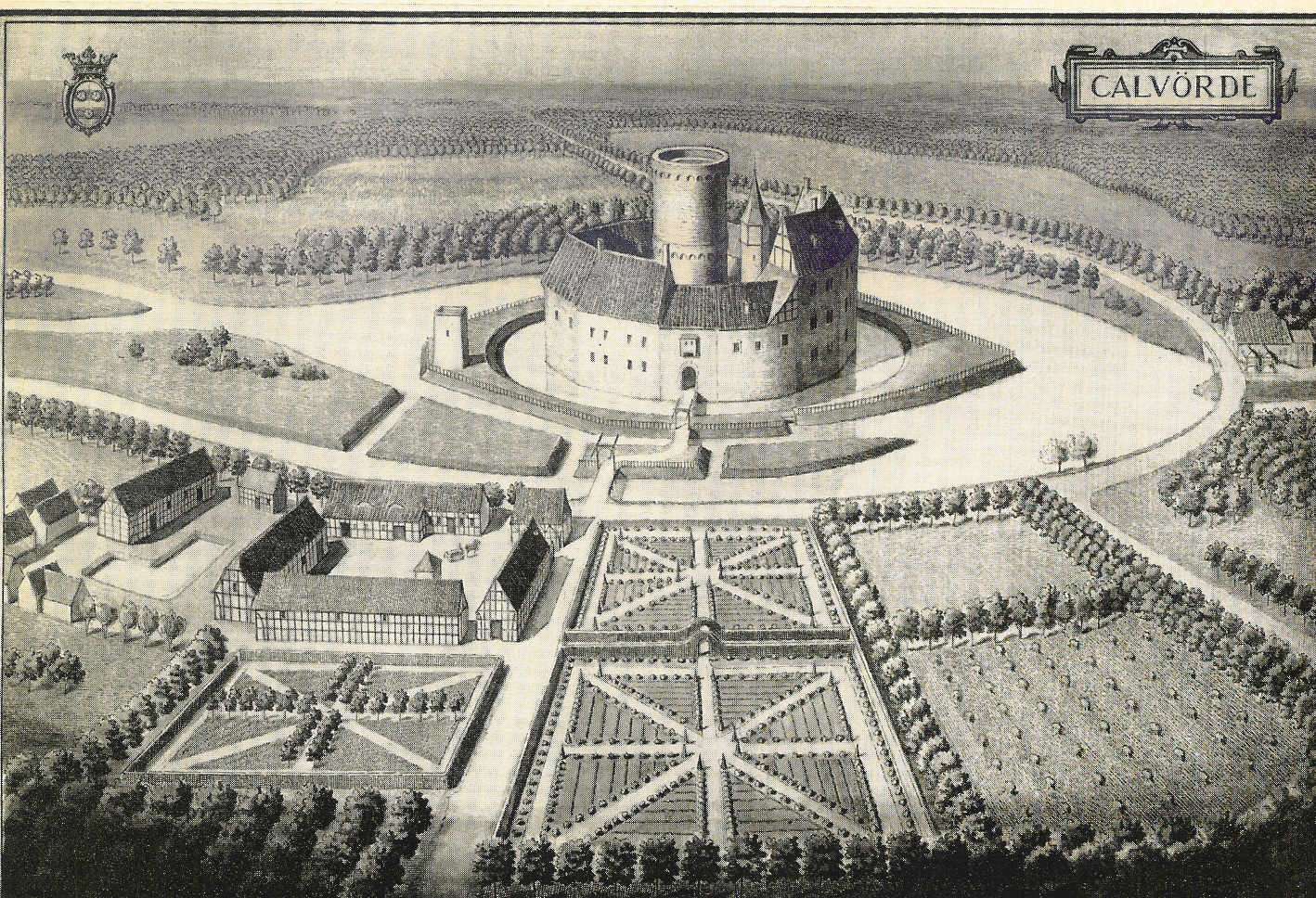
Calvörde Castle around 1600 - drawing by Anco Wigboldus

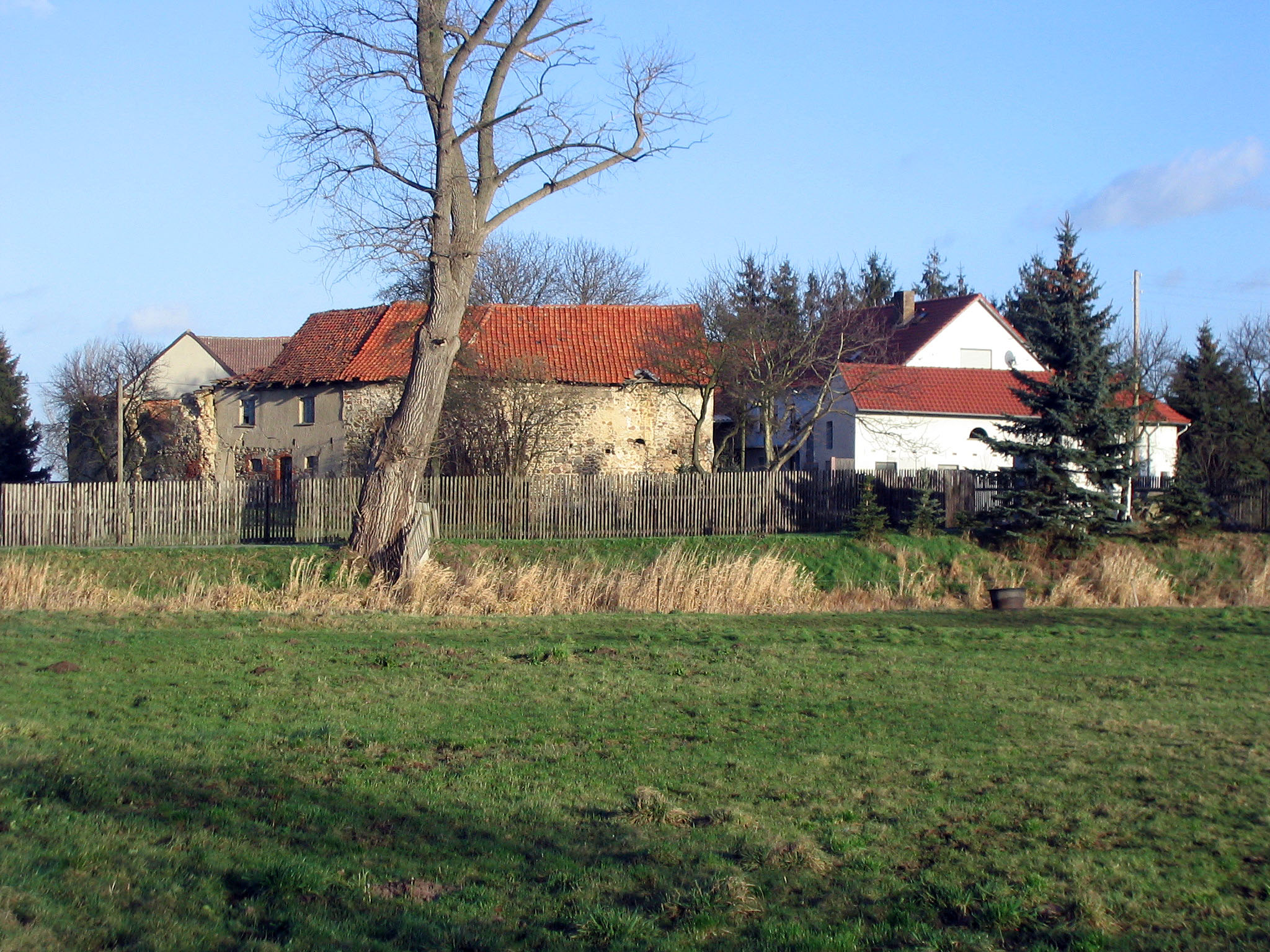
Present state

The circular upper ward (Oberburg) is a group of buildings of various epochs. It was protected by several branches of the River Ohre and accessible over a drawbridge. The courtyard (Amtshof), watermill and the star-shaped gardens are representative of its appearance in the 17th century. The road to Gardelegen still runs in a semi-circle on the embankment of the Ohre. The lower part of the round bergfried in the centre of the inner courtyard is made of fieldstone, the upper storeys of red brick. It was thus called de rode Hinrik ("the red Henry"). The tower bears the Alvensleben coat of arms and contains the dungeon. Above it, on two storeys, are the armouries and the accommodation for the tower keeper. The southeastern side of the site is occupied by the three-storey reception hall (Palas) with its Gothic staircase tower. On it are the coat of arms of Brunswick and an inscription dated 1590, the year the castle was renovated by Duke Henry Julius. On the upper floor of the great hall are living quarters, above that the great hall (Rittersaal) and, in the adjacent wing, the chapel. The castellans (Burgmannen) were accommodated in the northern part of the site Between that and the gatehouse are the brewery, bakery and granary (Kornhaus).

The crenellation and spire of the bergfried were destroyed in the Thirty Years' War. Other parts of the castle were demolished in 1737. In 1828 the castle was sold for demolition, so that the castle buildings have disappeared apart from an insignificant remnant.

== Gallery ==
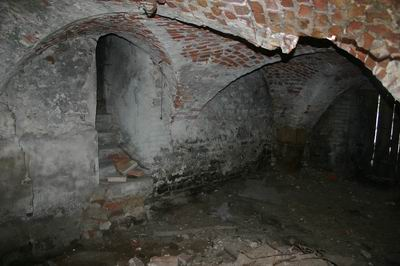
Cellar vaulting in the castle

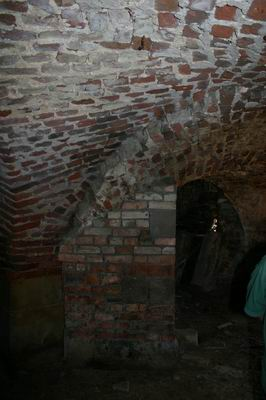
Detail of the cellar vaulting

== Literature ==
- Udo von Alvensleben: Alvenslebensche Burgen und Landsitze. Dortmund 1960.
- Berent Schwineköper (ed.): Handbuch der historischen Stätten Deutschlands. Elfter Band: Provinz Sachsen-Anhalt. Kröner, Stuttgart 1987, ISBN 3-520-31402-9, pp. 67–68.
- Siegmund Wilhelm Wohlbrück: Geschichtliche Nachrichten von dem Geschlecht von Alvensleben. Vol. I. 1819, pp. 410–417.
