= Falkenberg Mast =

Coordinates: 52°9′59.91″N 14°7′19.83″E

The Falkenberg Mast is a 99m guyed tower for meteorological measurements. It is located in the German state of Brandenburg at 52°9'59.91"N 14°7'19.83"E close to the Meteorological observatory Lindenberg (MOL) of the German Weather Service (DWD).

The mast is fitted every 10m with equipment to measure wind speed, temperature and humidity, and sited in an enclosure with further equipment for monitoring several other meteorological parameters.

== See also ==
- List of masts
