= Lowland castle =

Type of castle situated on a lowland, plain, or valley floor

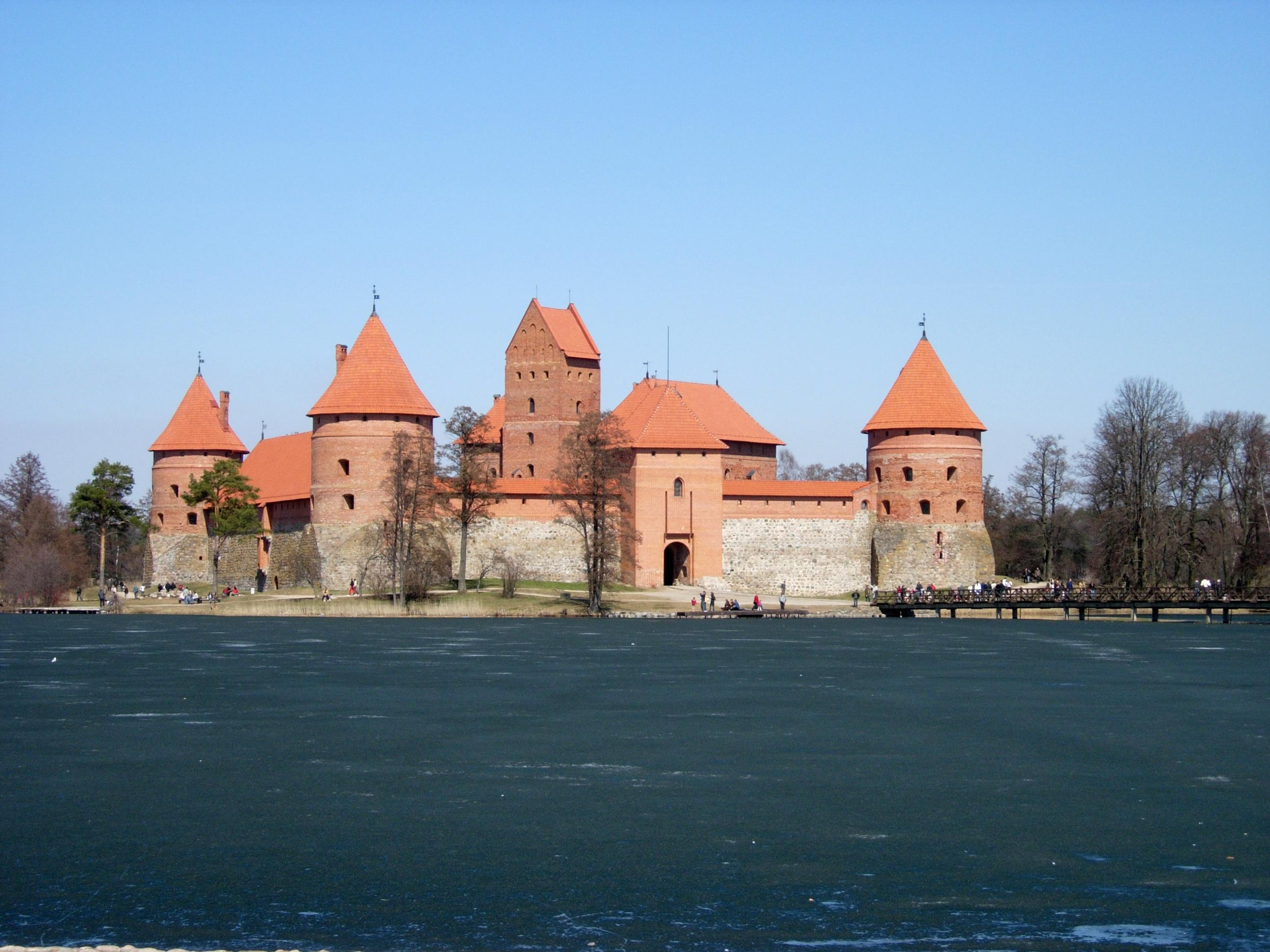
Trakai Castle (Lithuania), an island castle

The term lowland castle or plains castle (German: Niederungsburg, Flachlandburg, Tieflandburg) describes a type of castle that is situated on a lowland, plain or valley floor, as opposed to one built on higher ground such as a hill spur. The classification is extensively used in Germany where about 34 percent of all castles are of the lowland type.

Because lowland castles do not have the defensive advantage of a site on higher ground, sites are chosen that are easy to defend, taking advantage, for example, of rivers, islands in lakes or marshes. Where such natural obstacles do not exist, artificially similar obstacles take on added significance. These include water-filled or dry moats, ramparts, palisades and curtain walls. In order to increase the height of the castle above the surrounding terrain, artificial earth mounds may be built (such as mottes), and fortified towers also fulfil this purpose.

Castles of the Early Middle Ages (including Slavic and Saxon castles) often had a narrow, deep ditch and high and steep earth ramparts.

Lowland castles are naturally found on plains such as the North German Plain or in the Netherlands, but they may also be encountered occasionally in highlands, for example in a valley as a so-called island castle (Inselburg) on an island in a river (e.g. Pfalzgrafenstein Castle).

== Types ==
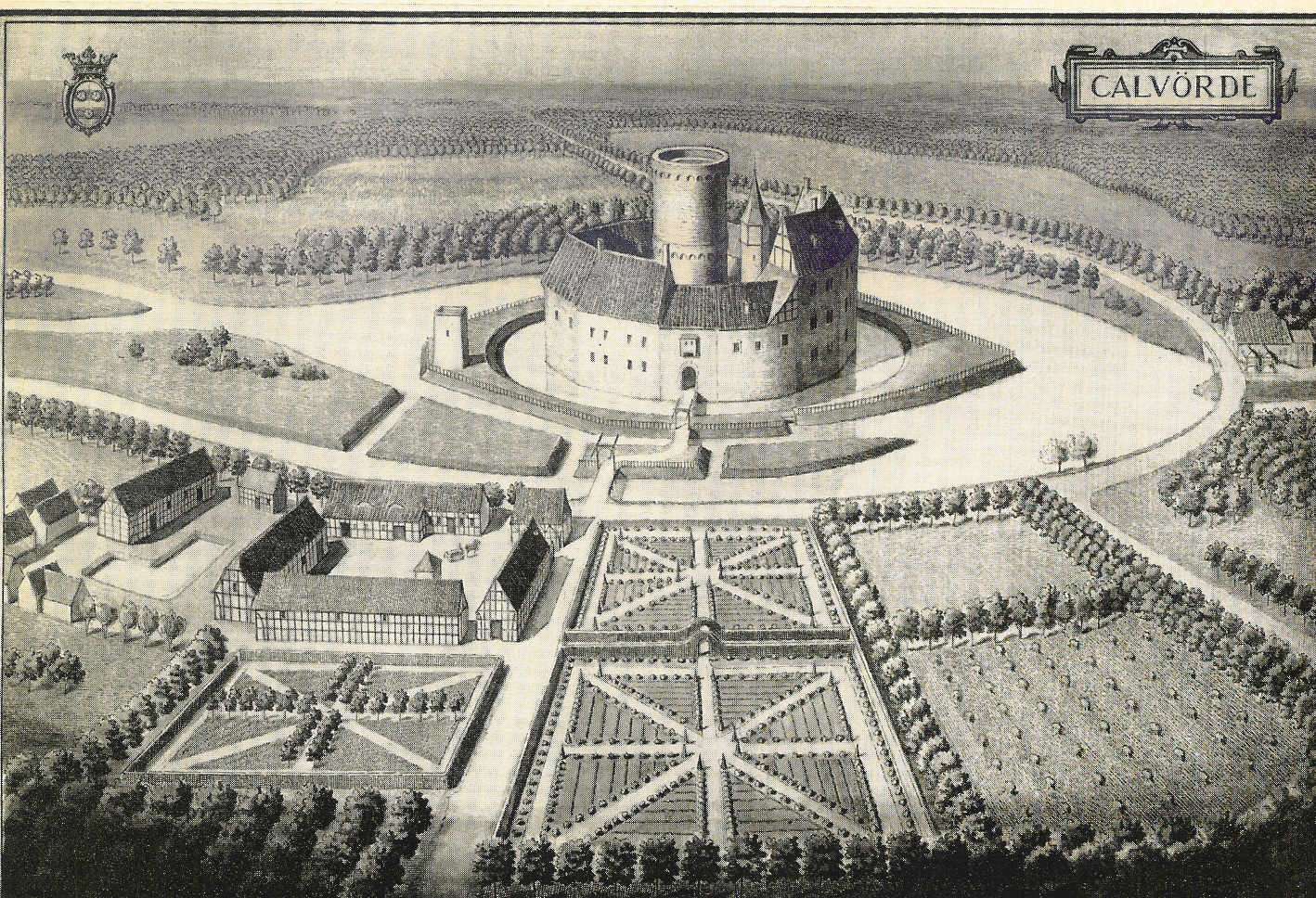
The moat at Calvörde Castle was linked to the River Ohre via a canal system.

- Water castle (Wasserburg): Overarching term for all castle types that use water as a defensive obstacle. Depending on their topographic situation these castles may be subdivided into (original German terms in brackets):
- River castles (Flussburg): a castle erected on a river bank. As a rule, they are also surrounded by moats filled with water supplied by the river.
- Shore castle (Uferburg): castle by a lake or the sea. Like river castles, shore castles usually have artificial ditches (moats) with a link to the waterbody.
- Island castle (Inselburg): castle on a natural, more rarely on an artificial, island in a river or lake.
- Marsh castle (Sumpfburg): castle in marshy or boggy terrain. It uses the natural inaccessibility of the terrain to its defensive advantage.
- Valley castle (Talburg): Castle on a valley bottom. A special variation are so-called Talsperren ("valley barriers"), where fortifications in the valley are linked to a hillside or hilltop castle so that this type consists of a combination of a lowland castle and a hill castle. An example are the Castles of Bellinzona.

Sub-types according to function:

- Bridge castle (Brückenburg): a castle built to watch over and protect a river crossing.
- Harbour castle (Hafenburg): a castle that is built to protect a harbour.

== Examples ==
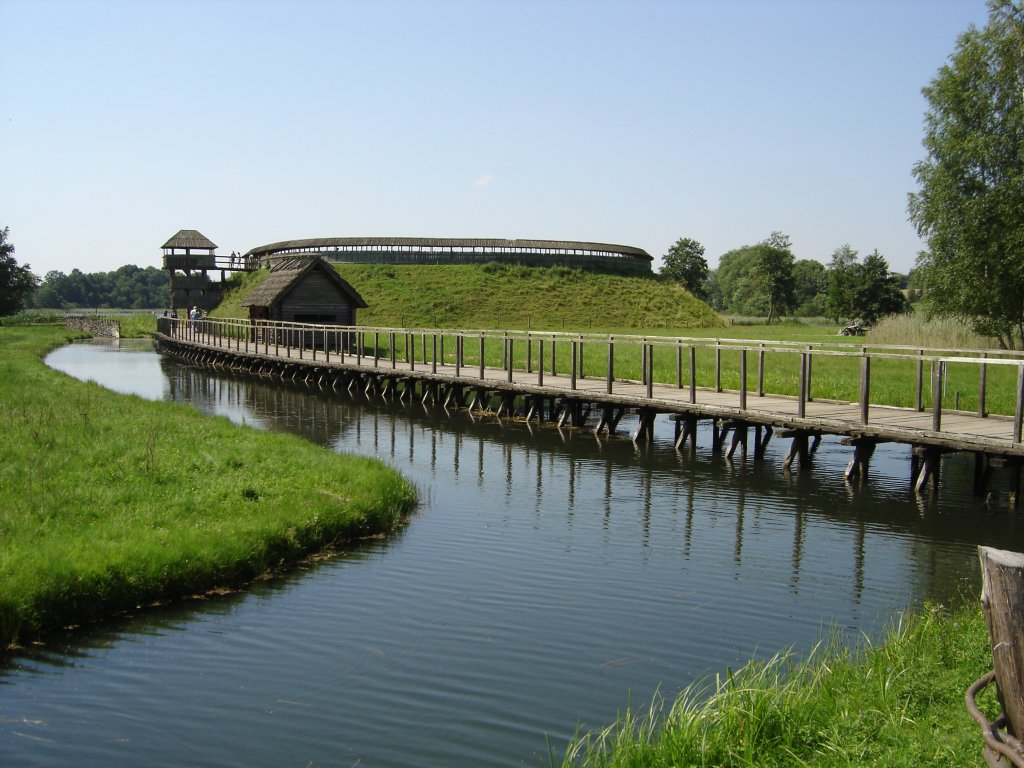
Groß Raden, castle from the Early Middle Ages

- Caerlaverock Castle, water castle with triangular plan, Scotland
- Eilean Donan Castle, restored island castle, Scotland
- Warwick Castle, river castle, England
- Château de Sully-sur-Loire, water castle in the Loire Valley, France
- Beersel Castle, Late Middle Ages brick castle, Belgium
- Nassenfels Castle, castle on the site of a Roman castellum, Germany
- Groß Raden, Early Middle Ages Slavic island castle, Germany
- Dankwarderode Castle, state castle (Landesburg) of the Brunswick dukes, Germany
- Malbork Castle, seat of the Teutonic Knights and greatest brick building in Europe, Poland
- Smederevo Fortress, river castle, largest plains fortress in Europe, Serbia

== Sources ==
- Böhme, Horst Wolfgang; Friedrich, Reinhard and Schock-Werner, Barbara (ed.) (2004). Wörterbuch der Burgen, Schlösser und Festungen. Reclam, Stuttgart, p. 156, ISBN 3-15-010547-1
- Krahe, Friedrich-Wilhelm (2002). Burgen und Wohntürme des deutschen Mittelalters. Vol. 1, Thorbecke, Stuttgart, 2002, pp. 21–23, ISBN 3-7995-0104-5,
