= Storkow, Brandenburg =

Storkow
- Town
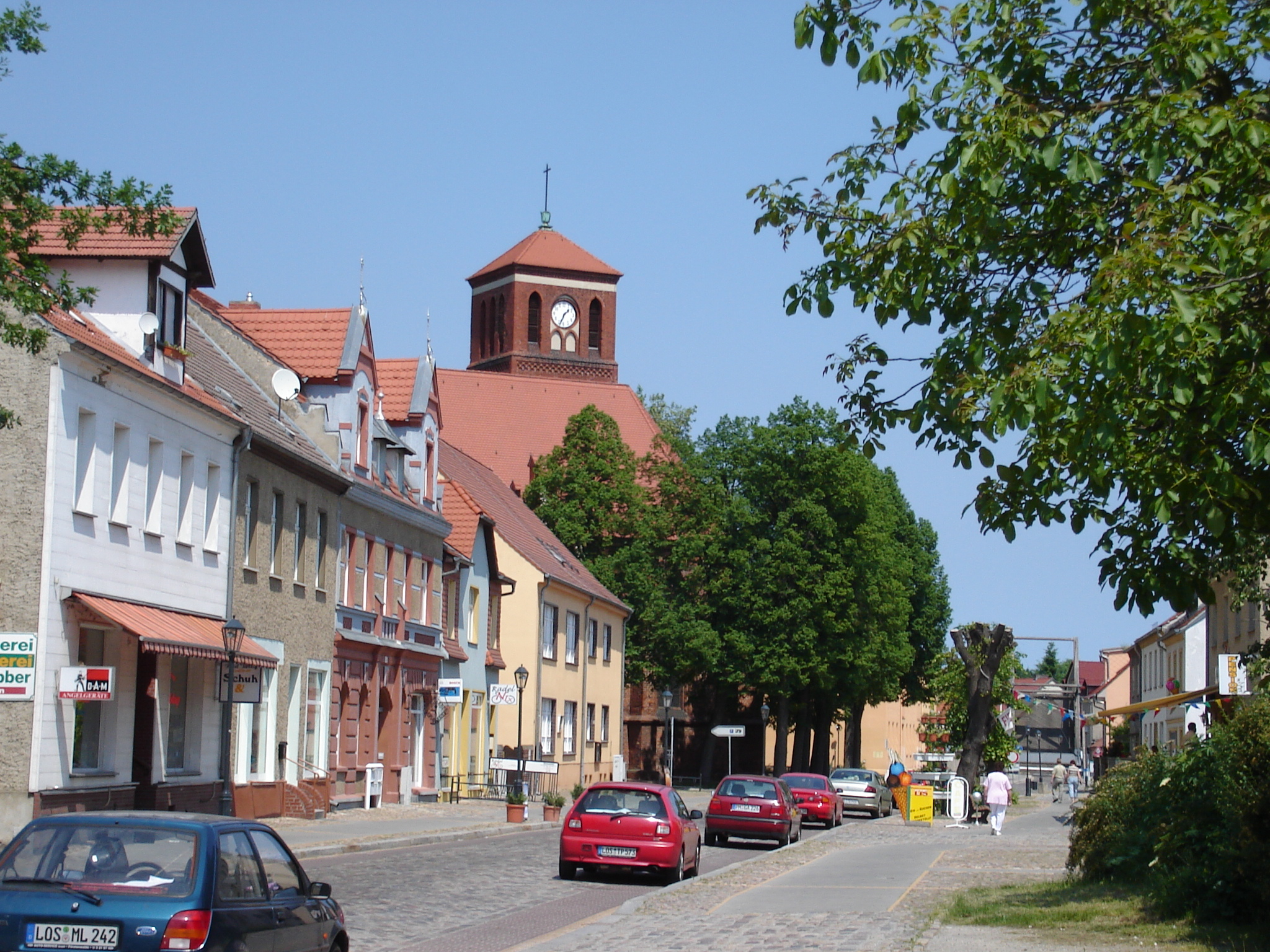
- Town centre and parish church

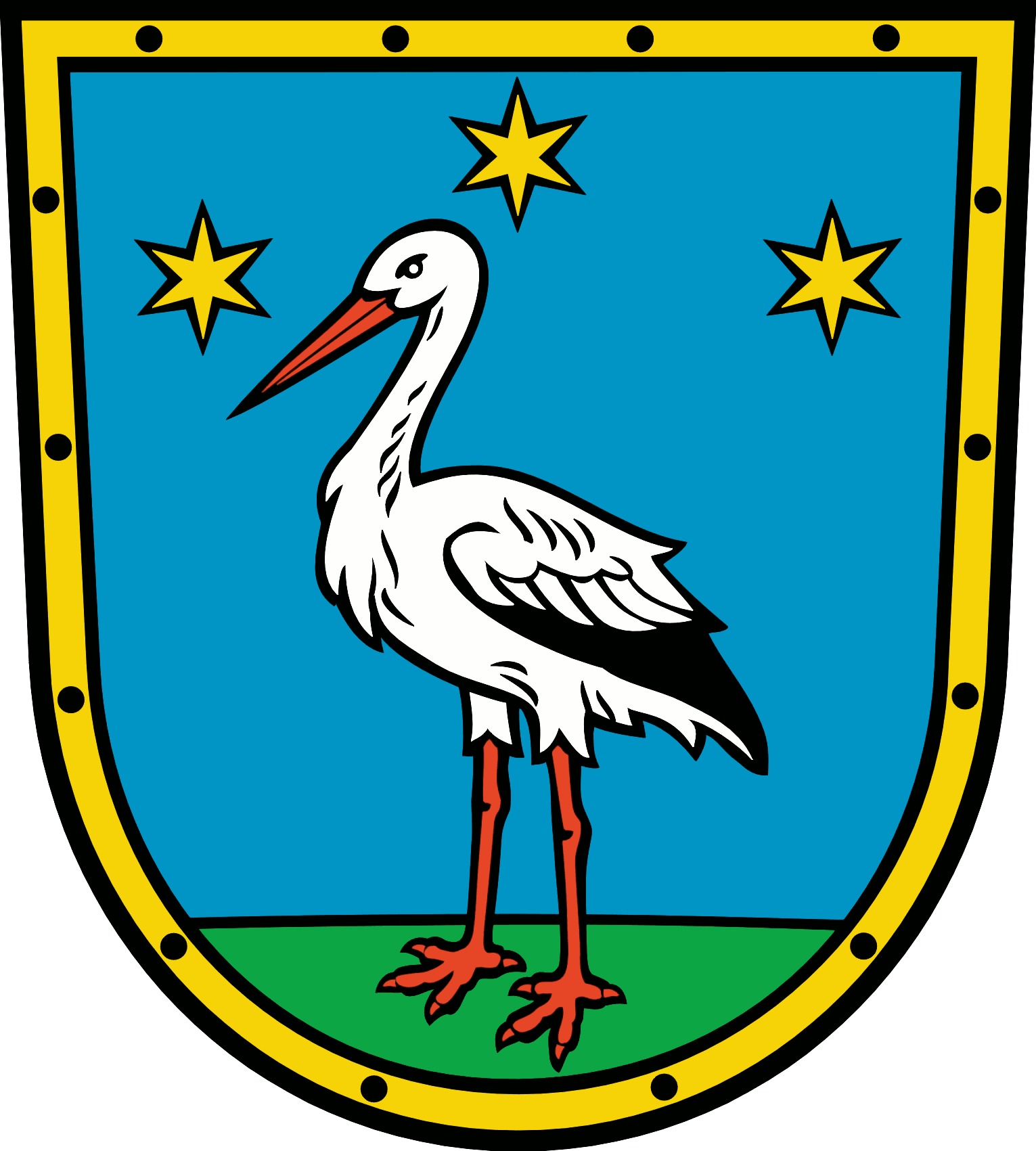
- Coat of arms

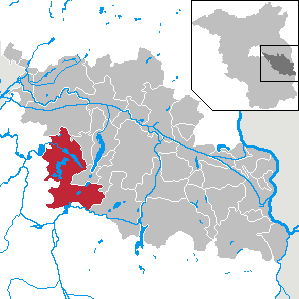
- Location of Storkow within Oder-Spree district
- Interactive map of Storkow
- Location within Germany Location within Brandenburg
- Coordinates: 52°15′12″N 13°55′48″E
- Country: Germany
- State: Brandenburg
- District: Oder-Spree
- Subdivisions: 13 Ortsteile

Government
  - Mayor (2019–27): Cornelia Schulze-Ludwig (SPD)

Area
  - Total: 180.72 km^{2} (69.78 sq mi)
- Elevation: 37 m (121 ft)

Population (2025-12-31)
  - Total: 9,202
  - Density: 50.92/km^{2} (131.9/sq mi)
- Time zone: UTC+01:00 (CET)
  - Summer (DST): UTC+02:00 (CEST)
- Postal codes: 15859
- Dialling codes: 033678
- Vehicle registration: LOS
- Website: storkow.de

Storkow (Mark) (German pronunciation: [ˈʃtɔʁkoː]) is a town in Oder-Spree district, in Brandenburg, Germany. The town was the part of Brandenberg Province of Prussia, from 1815 - 1947, then it was the part of the State of Brandenburg from 1947 to 1952, Bezirk Frankfurt of East Germany from 1952 to 1990 and it again became a part of the State of Brandenburg since 1990.

== Geography ==
Storkow is situated in the western part of Oder-Spree district, about 15 km (9.3 mi) southwest of Fürstenwalde. The municipal area comprises several lakes of the Dahme-Heideseen Nature Park; in the south, the Spreewald biosphere reserve stretches into Lower Lusatia.

=== Division of the town ===
The following villages of the former Amt Storkow were incorporated into the present municipality with effect from 26 October 2003:

- Alt-Stahnsdorf (population: 384)
- Bugk (population: 194)
- Görsdorf (population: 556)
- Groß Eichholz (population: 141)
- Groß Schauen (population: 178)
- Kehrigk (population: 325)
- Kummersdorf (population: 499)
- Limsdorf (population: 377)
- Philadelphia (population: 258)
- Rieplos (population: 132)
- Schwerin (population: 131)
- Selchow (population: 269)
- Wochowsee (population: 60)

The municipalities of Alt Stahnsdorf, Limsdorf, Schwerin, Wochowsee had merged with the town of Storkow on 31 March 2002. Storkow proper already included the hamlets of Karlslust, Neu Boston and Wolfswinkel.

The villages of Philadelphia and Neu Boston were named after their American counterparts by Frederick the Great in 1772.

== History ==
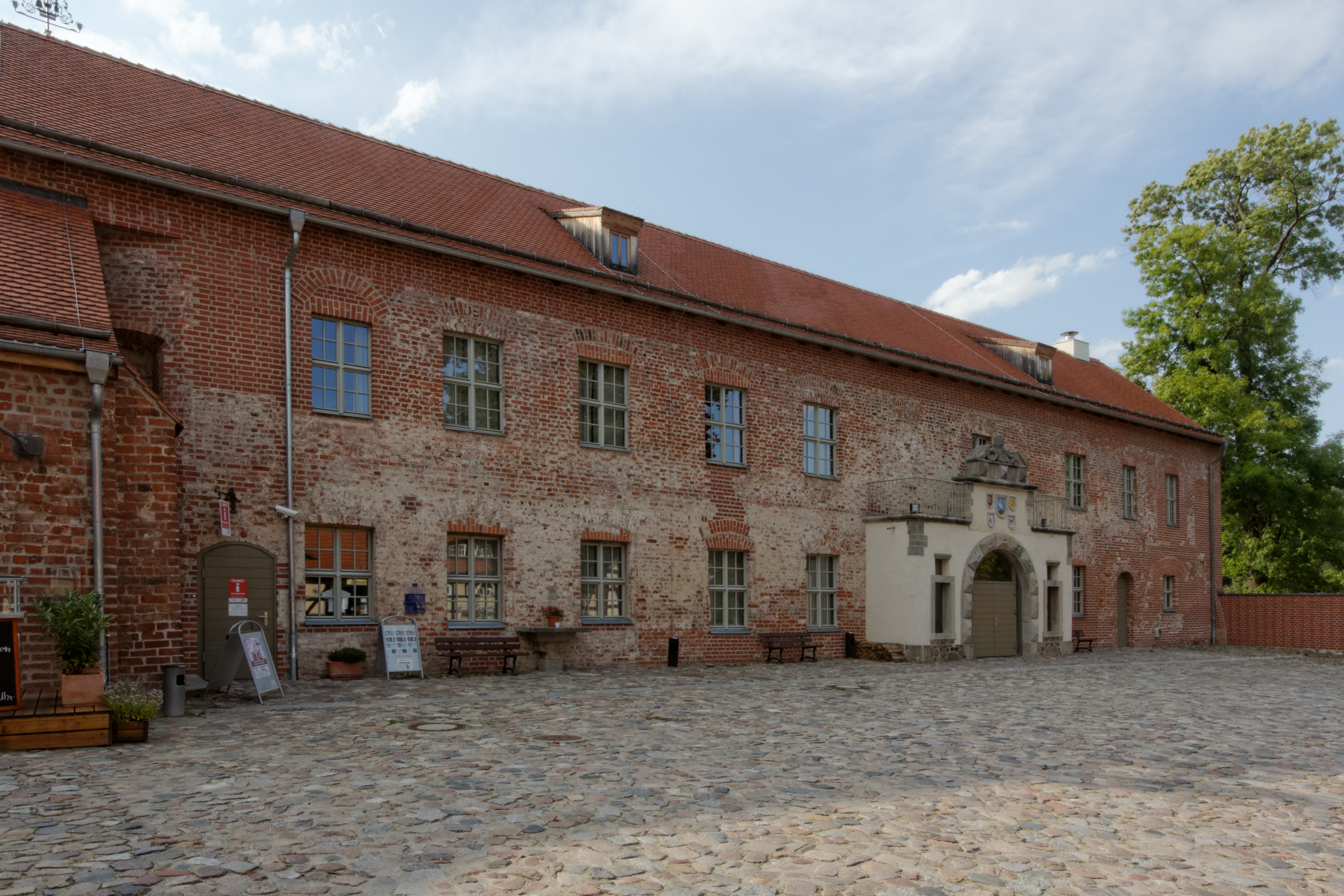
Storkow Castle

The town of Storkow was first mentioned in a 1209 deed issued by Emperor Otto IV; it thereby is one of the oldest towns in Brandenburg. In early medieval times, the area was settled by Polabian Slavs, it was incorporated by the Saxon margrave Gero in his vast marca Geronis and by 965 formed part of the Imperial March of Lusatia (or Saxon Eastern March). During the German Ostsiedlung migration, maybe under the rule of the Wettin margrave Conrad the Great in the mid 12th century, Storkow Castle was erected. It probably arose at the site of a former Slavic marsh fortress and served as administrative seat of Wettin ministeriales ruling over the extended Lusatian lordship (Herrschaft) of Storkow.

With Lower Lusatia, Storkow passed to the Lands of the Bohemian Crown in 1367; it was located near the northern border with the Margraviate of Brandenburg. From 1518, Storkow Castle was pawned to the Bishops of Lebus as an episcopal residence. Upon the death of the last Catholic bishop in 1555, it was presented as a gift to the Hohenzollern margrave John of Brandenburg-Küstrin by King Ferdinand I of Bohemia and, together with neighbouring Beeskow, finally merged into the Brandenburg electorate upon John's death in 1571.

Lower Sorbian was spoken by a significant proportion of the population until the early 17th century. Devastated during the Thirty Years' War, Storkow Castle was rebuilt in a Renaissance style under the rule of the "Great Elector" Frederick William. The town became part of the newly established Kingdom of Prussia in 1701. King Frederick the Great decisively promoted the local trade of weavers, bleachers and dyers.

From 1815 to 1947, Storkow was part of the Prussian Province of Brandenburg.

After World War II, Storkow was incorporated into the State of Brandenburg from 1947 to 1952 and the Bezirk Frankfurt of East Germany from 1952 to 1990. Since 1990 Storkow is again part of Brandenburg. In January, 1946, Storkow issued 16 postage stamps of its own, the final two semi-postals to raise funds for "victims of fascism." Storkow Castle was destroyed by a blaze in 1978; it was rebuilt after German reunification and today is a listed monument.

== Demography ==
Development of population since 1875 within the current Boundaries (Blue Line: Population; Dotted Line: Comparison to Population development in Brandenburg state; Grey Background: Time of Nazi Germany; Red Background: Time of communist East Germany)

Recent Population Development and Projections (Population Development before Census 2011 (blue line); Recent Population Development according to the Census in Germany in 2011 (blue bordered line); Official projections for 2005-2030 (yellow line); for 2017-2030 (scarlet line); for 2020-2030 (green line)

Storkow (Mark): Population development
within the current boundaries (2020)

Year	Pop.	±% p.a.
1875	6,004	—
1890	5,738	−0.30%
1910	6,172	+0.37%
1925	6,847	+0.69%
1939	7,824	+0.96%
1950	9,297	+1.58%
1964	8,626	−0.53%

Year	Pop.	±% p.a.
1971	8,581	−0.07%
1981	8,890	+0.35%
1985	8,801	−0.25%
1990	9,671	+1.90%
1995	9,320	−0.74%
2000	9,522	+0.43%
2005	9,476	−0.10%

Year	Pop.	±% p.a.
2010	9,077	−0.86%
2015	9,020	−0.13%
2016	9,070	+0.55%
2017	9,097	+0.30%
2018	9,180	+0.91%
2019	9,226	+0.50%
2020	9,352	+1.37%

== Politics ==
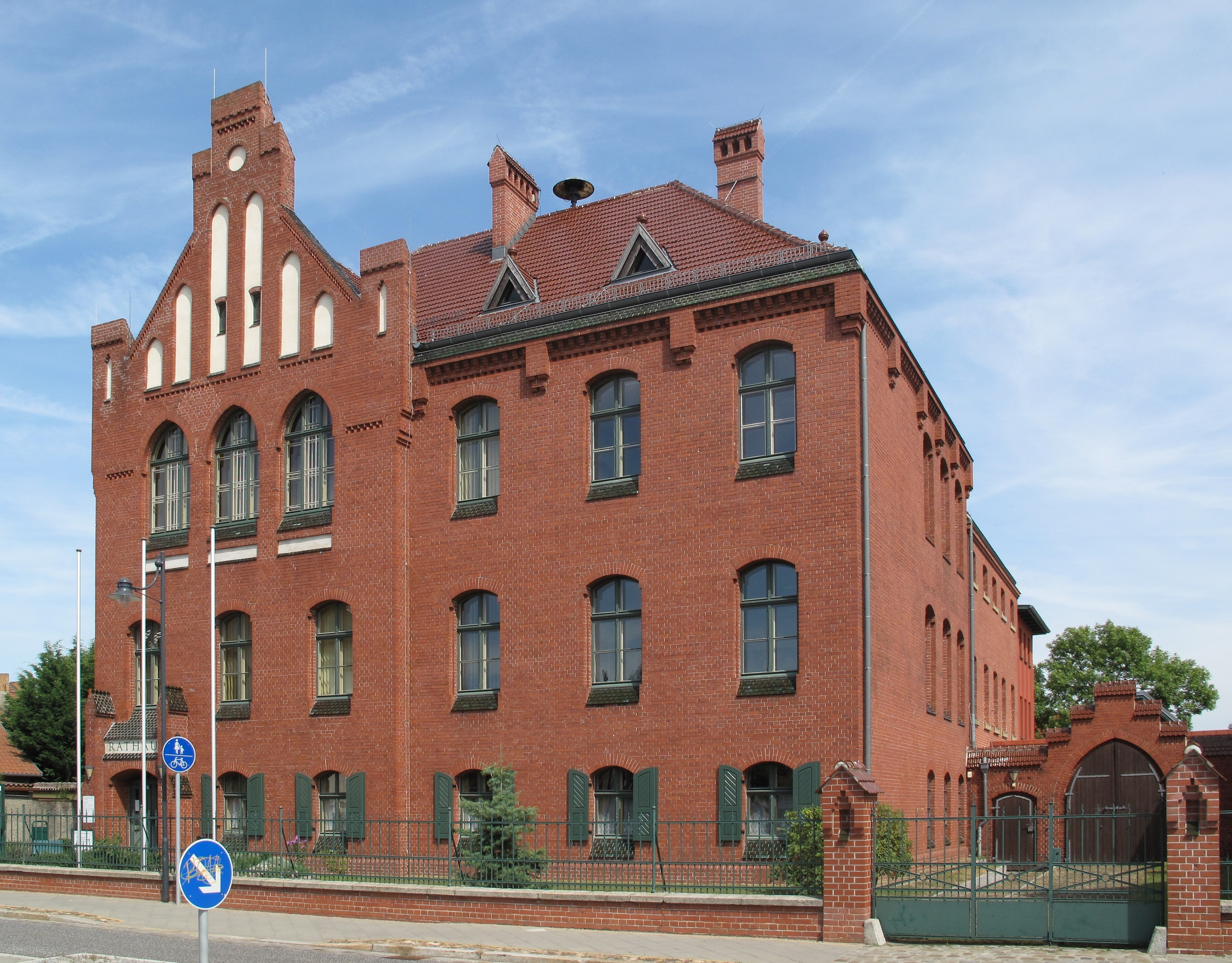
Town hall

Seats in the town's assembly (Stadtverordnetenversammlung) as of 2024 local elections:

- Alternative for Germany (AfD): 4
- Social Democratic Party of Germany (SPD): 4
- Free Voters: 3
- Wählergruppe Neues Storkow (independent): 3
- Christian Democratic Union (CDU): 2
- The Left: 1
- Enrico Graß: 1

=== Twin towns — sister cities ===
Storkow is twinned with:

- Opalenica, Poland, since 2003
