= Frankfurt Charterhouse =

Carthusian monastery in Frankfurt an der Oder, Germany

Coordinates: 51°20′0″N 14°33′11″E

Frankfurt Charterhouse

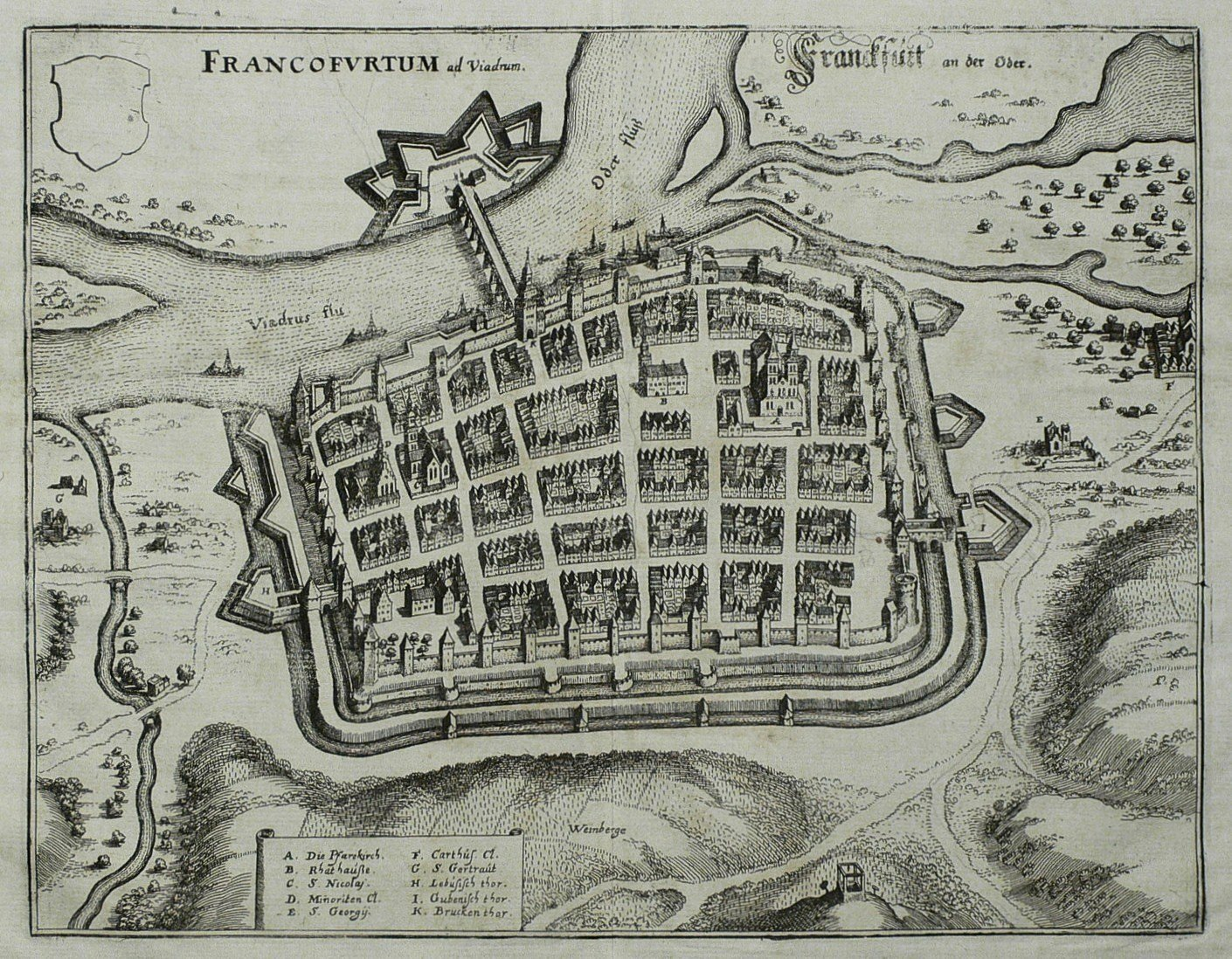

The charterhouse (Carthus) on Caspar Merian's 1652 plan Francofurtum ad Viadrum / Franckfurt an der Oder.

Frankfurt Charterhouse (German: Kartäuserkloster Frankfurt (Oder)) was a Carthusian monastery or charterhouse in Frankfurt an der Oder in Brandenburg, Germany.

== History ==
The charterhouse, dedicated as Domus Misericodiae Dei ("House of the Mercy of God"; Barmherzigkeit Gottes) was founded in 1396 by burghers of the town of Frankfurt an der Oder in front of the town walls, on the street leading to Guben on the banks of the Oder, in the area of the present Carthausplatz. The first monks settled in Frankfurt in the following year.

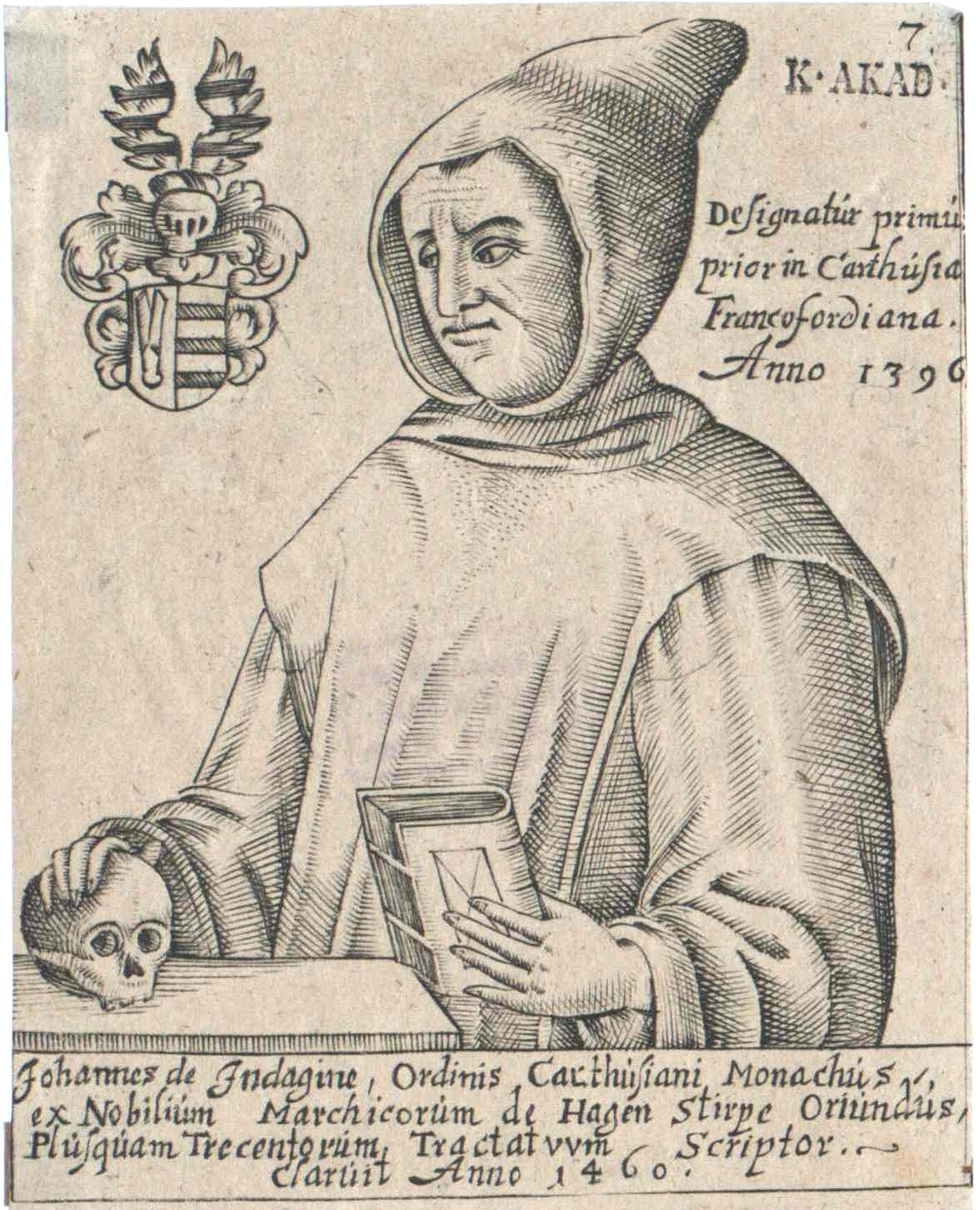
Johannes de Indagine, prior 1461–1464.

In 1432 the monastery was destroyed by the Hussites. Eleven monks are documented in 1506. The charterhouse possessed three vineyards, employed a wine manager (Weinmeister) and ran an extensive wine trade. It also had a brandy distillery and a beer brewery. The monastery owned the villages of Madlitz, Döbberin, Niederjesar, Arensdorf, Unter Lindow, Jacobsdorf, Briesen and Brieskow as well as the Große Heide ("Great Heath"). In 1534 the monastery was the subject of a visitation. In 1538 it still owned one vineyard and the villages of Brieskow and Lindow as well as the Brieskower See, abundant in fish.

The Reformation was introduced in Mark Brandenburg in 1539. In the following year Elector Joachim II granted all the possessions of the charterhouse to the Brandenburg University Frankfurt, including the monastic library, and all buildings, lands and estates. The remaining monks had the right to live in the monastery for the rest of their lives, but were forbidden to accept novices. The last prior was Peter Golitz. The last monk died in 1568.

The monastery buildings were used as a quarry. (The fruit from the gardens was given to the professors of Frankfurt University). In 1631 the remains of the buildings were burnt down during the siege by the Swedes.

Documents concerning the monastery are in the Stadtarchiv Frankfurt (Oder) and the Brandenburgisches Landeshauptarchiv. There are no visible remains of the buildings.
