= Berkenbrück station =

Railway station in Germany

Berkenbrück
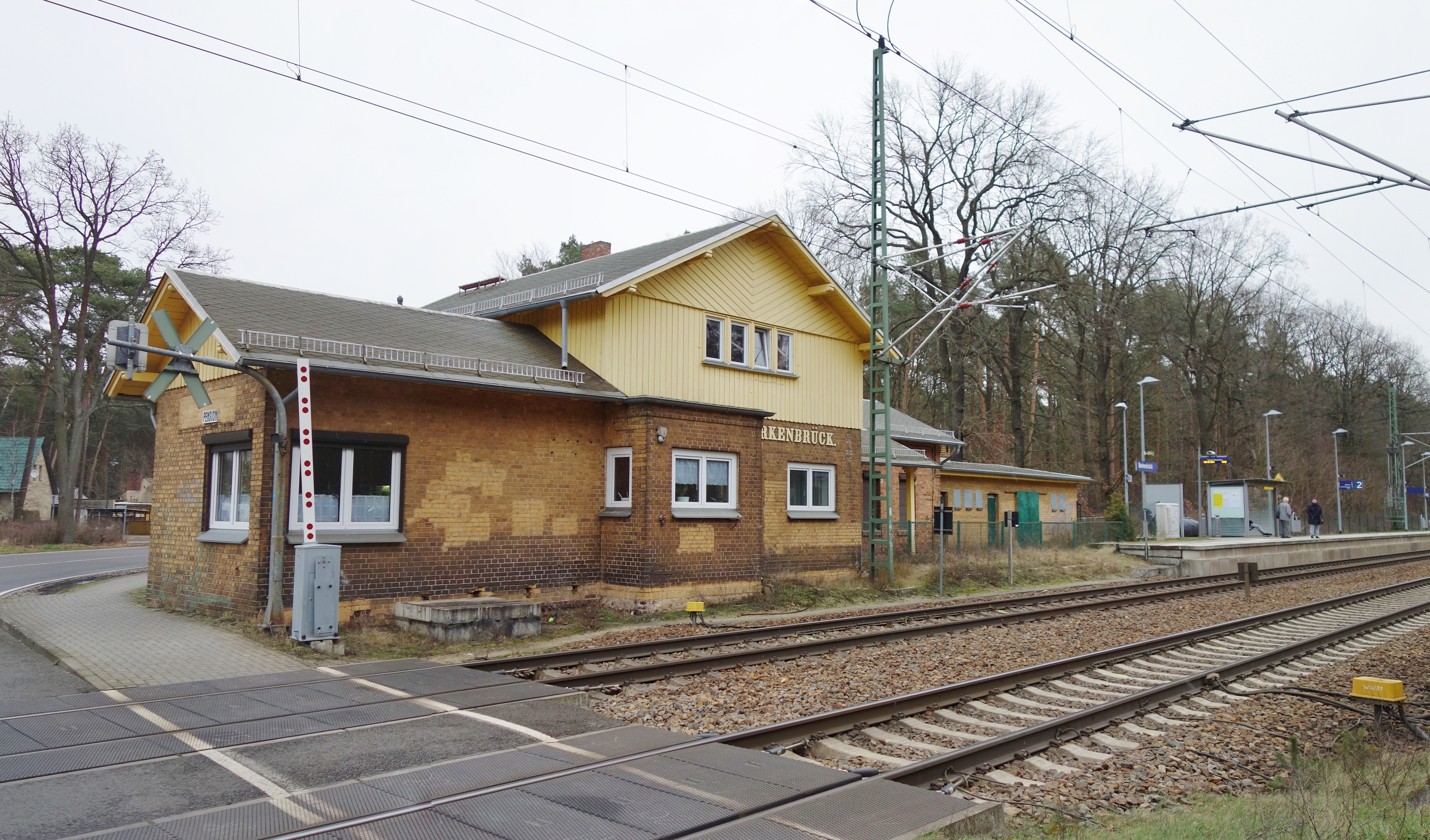
- 2018

General information
- Location: Am Bahnhof 1; 15518 Berkenbrück; Brandenburg; Germany
- Coordinates: 52°21′26″N 14°09′59″E
- Owner: Deutsche Bahn
- Operator: DB Station&Service
- Line: Berlin–Wrocław railway
- Platforms: 2 side platforms
- Tracks: 2
- Train operators: Ostdeutsche Eisenbahn

Other information
- Station code: 524
- DS100 code: BBKR
- IBNR: 8011154
- Category: 6
- Fare zone: : 5967
- Website: www.bahnhof.de

Services
Preceding station	Ostdeutsche Eisenbahn	Following station
Fürstenwalde (Spree) towards Magdeburg Hbf	RE 1	Briesen (Mark) towards Cottbus Hbf
Location
- Location within Brandenburg

Berkenbrück station is a railway station in the municipality of Berkenbrück, located in the amt Odervorland in the Oder-Spree district, Brandenburg, Germany.
