= Order of the Black Eagle =

Highest order of chivalry in the Kingdom of Prussia

Order of the Black Eagle Schwarzer Adlerorden
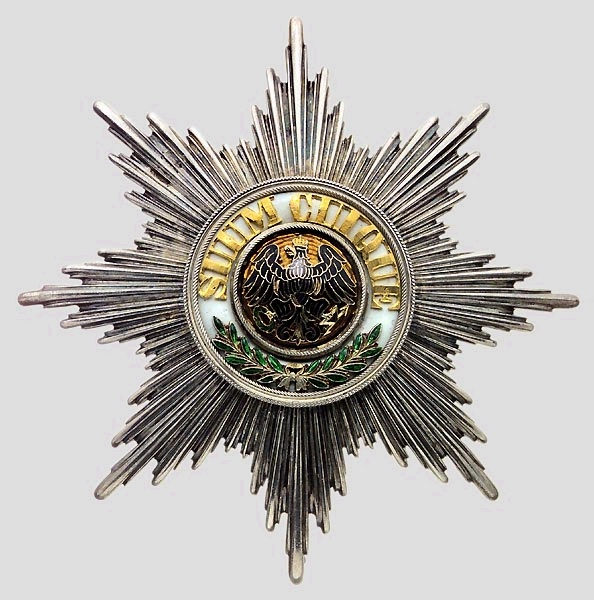
- Star of the Order of the Black Eagle
- Type: State Order (formerly); House Order (currently)
- Established: 17 January 1701
- Country: Kingdom of Prussia
- Royal house: House of Hohenzollern
- Motto: Suum Cuique (idiomatically, "to each according to his merits")
- Eligibility: Members of ruling houses, senior civil and military officials and other worthy figures appointed by the King of Prussia.
- Awarded for: Civil or military merit
- Sovereign: Prince Georg Friedrich
- Grades: Knight

Statistics
- First induction: 1701
- Total inductees: 407 (to 1918)

Precedence
- Next (higher): None
- Next (lower): Order of Merit of the Prussian Crown
- Ribbon of the order

The Order of the Black Eagle (German: Hoher Orden vom Schwarzen Adler) was the highest order of chivalry in the Kingdom of Prussia. The order was founded on 17 January 1701 by Elector Friedrich III of Brandenburg (who became Friedrich I, King in Prussia, the following day). In his Dutch exile after World War I, deposed Emperor Wilhelm II continued to award the order to his family. He made his second wife, Princess Hermine Reuss of Greiz, a Lady in the Order of the Black Eagle.

== Overview ==
The statutes of the order were published on 18 January 1701, and revised in 1847. Membership in the Order of the Black Eagle was limited to a small number of knights, and was divided into two classes: members of reigning houses (further divided into members of the House of Hohenzollern and members of other houses, both German and foreign) and capitular knights. Before 1847, membership was limited to nobles, but after that date, capitular knights who were not nobles were raised to the nobility (Adelsstand). Capitular knights were generally high-ranking government officials or military officers.

The Order of the Black Eagle had only one class, but could also be awarded at the king's prerogative "with the Chain" ("mit der Kette") or without ("ohne Kette"). By statute, members of the order also held the Grand Cross of the Order of the Red Eagle, and wore the badge of that order from a ribbon around the neck. From 1862, members of the Prussian royal house, upon award of the Order of the Black Eagle, also received the Prussian Crown Order 1st Class.

== Insignia ==
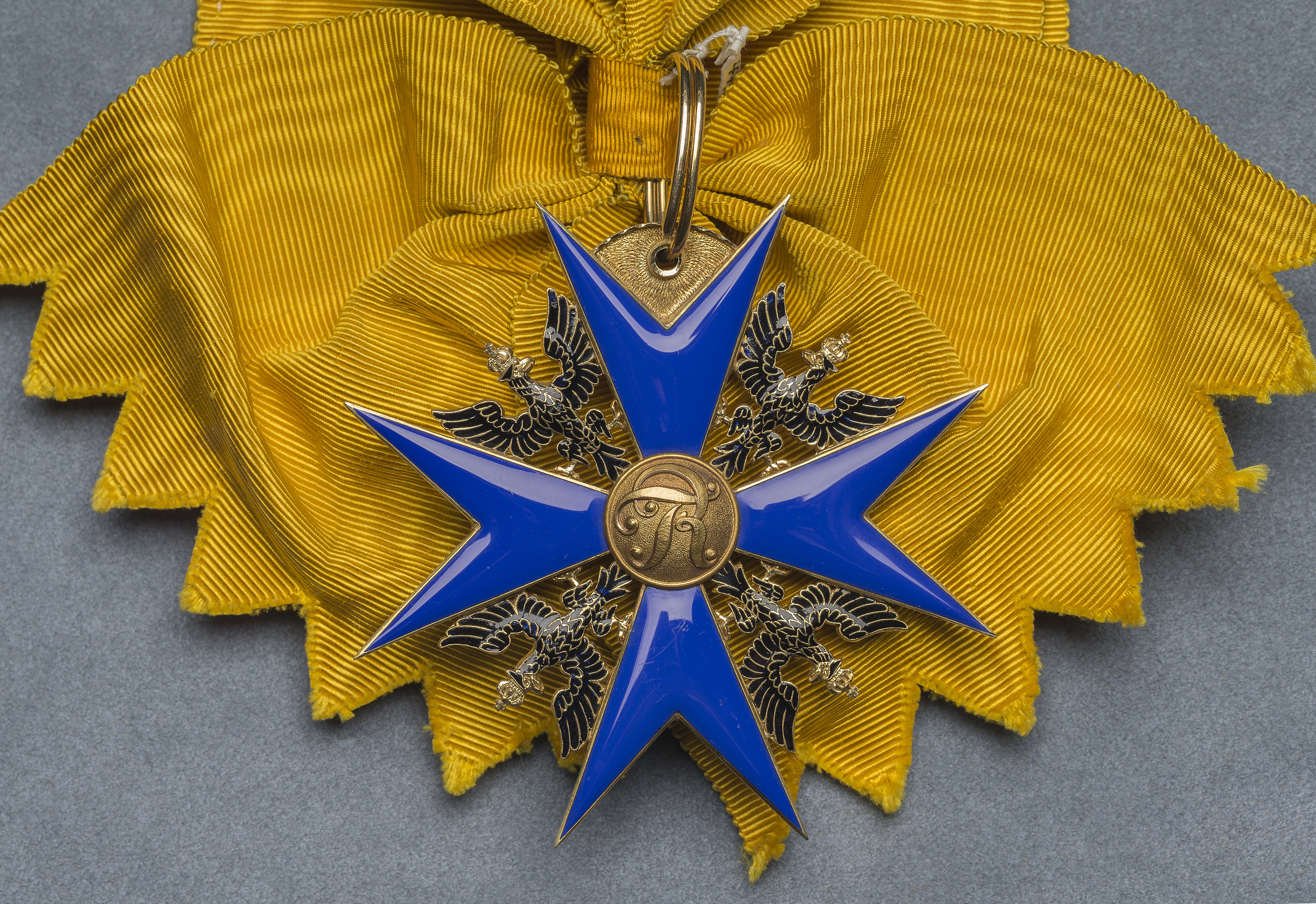
Badge of the Order of the Black Eagle.

The badge of the Order was a gold Maltese cross, enameled in blue, with gold-crowned black eagles between the arms of the cross. The gold center medallion bore the royal monogram of Friedrich I ("FR", for Fredericus Rex).

This badge was worn from either a broad ribbon (or sash) or a collar (or "chain"). The ribbon of the Order was an orange moiré sash worn from the left shoulder to the right hip, with the badge resting on the hip. The sash color was chosen in honor of Louise Henriette of Nassau, daughter of the Prince of Orange and first wife of the great elector. The collar or chain (Kette) was worn around the neck and resting upon the shoulders, with the badge suspended from the front center; the collar had 24 elaborate interlocking links: alternately a black eagle and a device featuring a center medallion with the motto of the Order (Suum Cuique—literally "To each his own," but idiomatically "To each according to his merits"), a series of FRs forming a cross pattern, a blue enameled ring around this, and crowns at each cross point.

The star of the Order was a silver eight-pointed star, with straight or faceted rays depending on the jeweler's design. The center medallion displayed a black eagle (which gripped a wreath of laurels in its left claws and a scepter in its right) on a golden background, surrounded by a white enamelled ring bearing a wreath of laurels and the motto of the Order.

At meetings of the chapter of the Order of the Black Eagle and at certain ceremonies, the knights wore red velvet capes with blue linings. Embroidered on the left shoulder of each cape was a large star of the Order.

== Membership ==
From its founding in 1701 to 1918, the Order of the Black Eagle was awarded 407 times, with 57 of these installations occurring during the reign of Friedrich I (1701–1713). In 1918, the knights of the order totalled 118 – 14 were members of the Prussian royal house, one was a member of the Princely House of Hohenzollern, 49 (of whom nine were from states then at war with Germany) were members of other reigning houses, and 54 (including 17 who had not yet been fully installed) were nonroyal Germans. Subjects of the Prussian King receiving the order, which was only given in one class, were promoted to the peerage and received a hereditary title.

From the Prussian State Handbooks, it is clear that the Order of the Black Eagle (as well as, by statute, the other Prussian orders, as mentioned above) was conferred upon all male members of the royal family on their 10th birthdays; these men received the collar of the Order on their 18th birthdays. The Order was also conferred upon Prussian queens (and, later, German empresses), though other female members of the royal family usually received the Order of Louise instead.

== Sovereigns and Masters of the Order ==
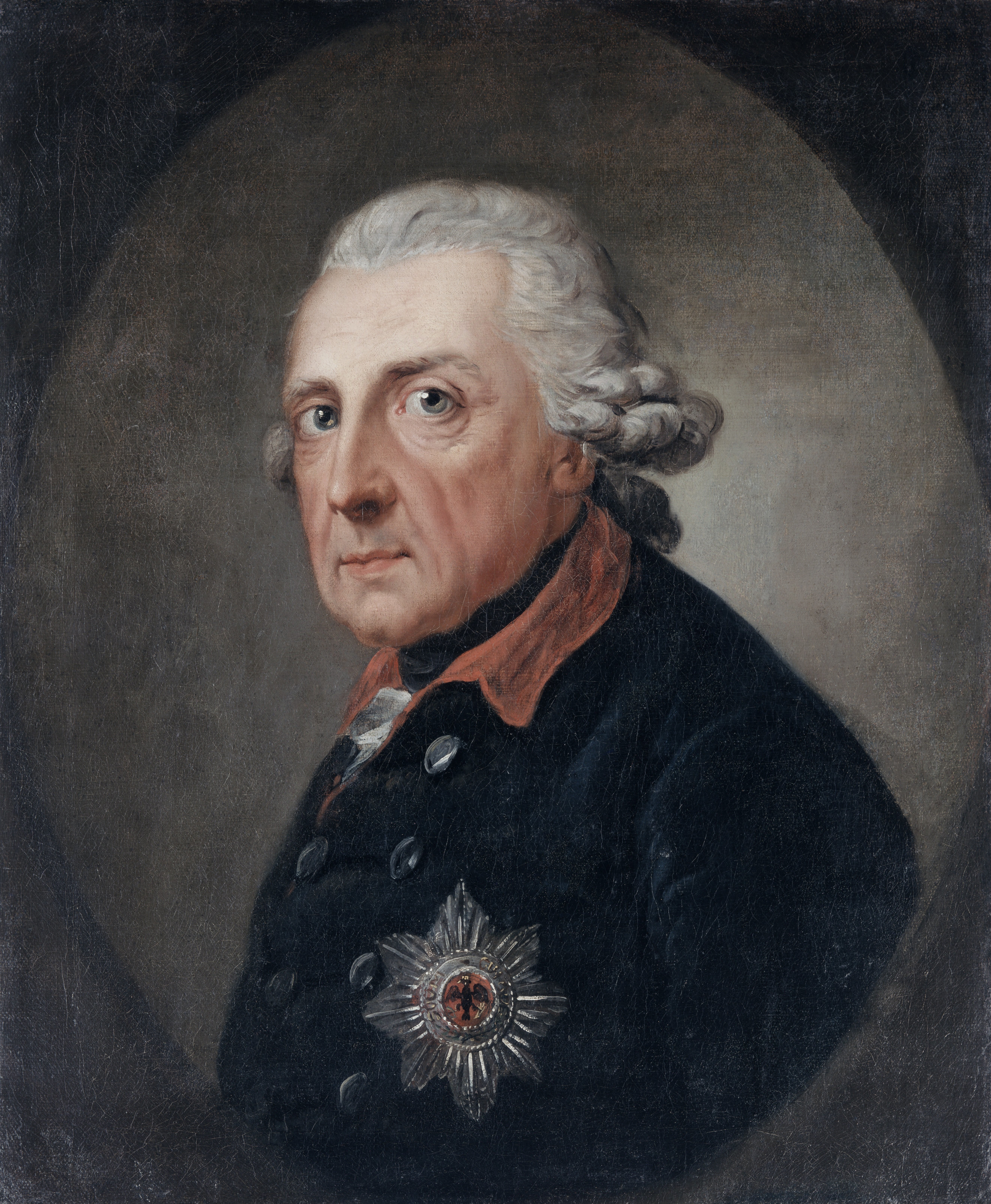
Frederick II with Order of the Black Eagle (Portrait by Anton Graff 1781).

- Friedrich I of Prussia (1657–1713) — founder and first grandmaster of the Order of the Black Eagle; last Elector of Brandenburg and first King in Prussia
- Frederick William I of Prussia (1688–1740) — first member of the Order, inducted in 1701, when he was crown prince; Sovereign and Master of the Order, 1713–1740
- Friedrich II (1712–1786) — "Friedrich the Great"; Sovereign and Master of the Order, 1740–1786
- Friedrich Wilhelm II of Prussia (1744–1797) — Sovereign and Master of the Order, 1786–1797
- Frederick William III of Prussia (1770–1840) — King of Prussia during the Napoleonic era; Sovereign and Master of the Order, 1797–1840
- Friedrich Wilhelm IV of Prussia (1795–1861) — Sovereign and Master of the Order, 1840–1861
- Wilhelm I (1797–1888) — King of Prussia and first German emperor; Sovereign and Master of the Order, 1861–1888
- Friedrich III (1831–1888) — better remembered as "Crown Prince Friedrich Wilhelm" of Prussia; general during the German wars of unification; briefly German emperor, March to June 1888; Died of throat cancer
- Wilhelm II (1859–1941) — last King of Prussia and last German emperor; Sovereign and Master of the Order, 1888–1941
- William, German Crown Prince (1882–1951), Sovereign and Master of the Order, 1941–1951
- Louis Ferdinand, Prince of Prussia (1907–1994), Sovereign and Master of the Order, 1951–1994
- Georg Friedrich, Prince of Prussia (born 1976), Sovereign and Master of the Order since 1994

== Recipients ==
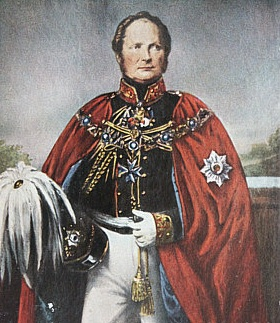
Friedrich Wilhelm IV, wearing the collar and cloak of the Order of the Black Eagle. Original portrait by Krüger

=== Royal House of Hohenzollern ===
- Frederick William, Margrave of Brandenburg-Schwedt, Prince in Prussia (1700–1770) — nephew of Friedrich I.
- August Wilhelm, Prince of Prussia (1722–1758) — second son of Friedrich Wilhelm I; brother of Friedrich II ("Friedrich the Great"); father of Friedrich Wilhelm II; Prussian general in the Silesian Wars
- Heinrich, Prince of Prussia (1726–1802) — third son of Friedrich Wilhelm I and younger brother of Friedrich the Great; general in the Seven Years' War
- August Ferdinand, Prince of Prussia (1730–1813) — fourth and youngest son of Friedrich Wilhelm I, and youngest brother of Friedrich the Great
- Ludwig Ferdinand, Prince of Prussia (1772–1806) — son of August Ferdinand; general in the Napoleonic Wars, killed at the Battle of Saalfeld
- Ludwig Karl, Prince of Prussia (1773–1796) — second son of Friedrich Wilhelm II and brother of Friedrich Wilhelm III
- Kaiserin Augusta (1811–1890) — Princess of Saxe-Weimar-Eisenach, wife and empress consort of Wilhelm I
- Karl, Prince of Prussia (1801–1883) — third son of Friedrich Wilhelm III of Prussia, father of Friedrich Karl
- Adalbert, Prince of Prussia (1811–1873) — son of Prinz Wilhelm; Grandson of Friedrich Wilhelm II and nephew of Friedrich Wilhelm III; naval theorist, admiral, and founder of the first Prussian Fleet
- Friedrich Karl, Prince of Prussia (1828–1885) — veteran of the Austro-Prussian War and Franco-Prussian War; hero of Königgrätz; Generalfeldmarschall of Prussia, and honorary field marshal of Russia; eldest son of Karl, father of Friedrich Leopold
- Albrecht, Prince of Prussia (1809–1872) — second and youngest son of Karl, father of Albrecht
- Heinrich, Prince of Prussia (1862–1929) — second son of Friedrich III and brother of Wilhelm II; Grand Admiral in the German Imperial Navy, World War I

Empress Auguste Viktoria, wearing the sash and star of the Order of the Black Eagle. Portrait by Philip de Laszlo

- Kaiserin Victoria (1840–1901) — "Kaiserin Friedrich"; Daughter of Queen Victoria, Princess Royal of Great Britain; wife and Empress consort of Friedrich III; mother of Wilhelm II; Dowager German Empress and Queen Dowager of Prussia, 1888–1901; recognized by Friedrich III, 9 March 1888
- Kaiserin Auguste Viktoria (1858–1921) — Princess of Schleswig-Holstein, (first) wife and empress consort of Wilhelm II
- Kronprinz Wilhelm (1882–1951) — Crown Prince of Germany and Prussia until 1918, World War I-era German general.
- Friedrich Leopold, Prince of Prussia (1865–1931) — son of Friedrich Karl, father of Friedrich Sigismund, Friedrich Karl, and Friedrich Leopold
- Albrecht, Prince of Prussia (1837–1906) — only son of Albrecht
- Friedrich Heinrich, Prince of Prussia (1874–1940) — eldest son of Albrecht and grandson of Albrecht
- Joachim Albrecht, Prince of Prussia (1876–1939) — second son of Albrecht and grandson of Albrecht
- Friedrich Wilhelm, Prince of Prussia (1880–1925) — third son of Albrecht and grandson of Albrecht
- Eitel Friedrich, Prince of Prussia (1883–1942) — second son of Wilhelm II
- Adalbert, Prince of Prussia (1884–1948) — third son of Wilhelm II – invested 18 January 1903
- August Wilhelm, Prince of Prussia (1887–1949) — fourth son of Wilhelm II
- Oskar, Prince of Prussia (1888–1958) — fifth son of Wilhelm II
- Waldemar, Prince of Prussia (1889–1945) — eldest son of Prince Heinrich, Grand Admiral
- Joachim, Prince of Prussia (1890–1920) — sixth and youngest son of Wilhelm II
- Friedrich Sigismund, Prince of Prussia (1891–1927) — eldest son of Friedrich Leopold; World War I pilot
- Friedrich-Karl, Prince of Prussia (1893–1917) — second son of Friedrich Leopold; Bronze medallist in the 1912 Olympics; World War I pilot; wounded in action, taken POW, and died of wounds (1917)
- Friedrich Leopold, Prince of Prussia (1895–1959) — third and youngest son of Friedrich Leopold
- Sigismund, Prince of Prussia (1896–1978) — second and youngest son of Prince Heinrich, Grand Admiral
- Wilhelm, Prince of Prussia (1906–1940) — eldest son of Crown prince Wilhelm

=== Princely House of Hohenzollern ===
- Karl Anton, Sovereign Prince Hohenzollern-Sigmaringen (1811–1885)
- Leopold, Sovereign Prince Hohenzollern-Sigmaringen (1835–1905) — son of Karl Anton
- Wilhelm, Sovereign Prince Hohelnzollern-Sigmaringen (1864–1927)
- Ferdinand, Prince of Hohenzollern-Sigmaringen (b. 1865-1927) — brother of Sovereign Prince Wilhelm, reigned as Ferdinand I of Romania, 1914–1927
- Karl, Prince of Hohenzollern-Sigmaringen (1839–1914) — second son of Karl Anton; reigned as Carol I of Romania, 1881–1914

=== Foreign royal members of the Order ===
- Prince Alexander of the Netherlands (1818-1848), invested with the order 4 December 1834
- Albert I of Belgium (1875–1934) — King of the Belgians during the First World War
- Albrecht, Duke of Württemberg (1865–1939) — Head of the Royal House of Württemberg, invested with the order 18 January 1900
- Alexander III – Tsar of Russia (1881–1894)
- Prince Arthur, Duke of Connaught and Strathearn (1850–1942) — Kaiser Wilhelm II's uncle, he was still a member of the order in 1918 despite being a British military officer.
- Prince Carl, Duke of Västergötland (1861–1951) — Prince of Sweden
- Carol I of Romania — King of Romania (1866–1914); member of the Princely House of Hohenzollern.
- Charles XV — King of Sweden and Norway (1859–1872)
- Christian IX of Denmark — King of Denmark (1863–1906)
- Chulalongkorn — King of Siam (1868–1910)
- Constantine I of Greece — King of Greece (1913–1917 and 1920–1922)
- Pedro II of Brazil — Emperor of Brazil (1831-1889)
- Edward VII — King of Great Britain and Ireland, Emperor of India (1901–1910).
- Prince Eugén, Duke of Närke — Prince of Sweden (1865–1947)

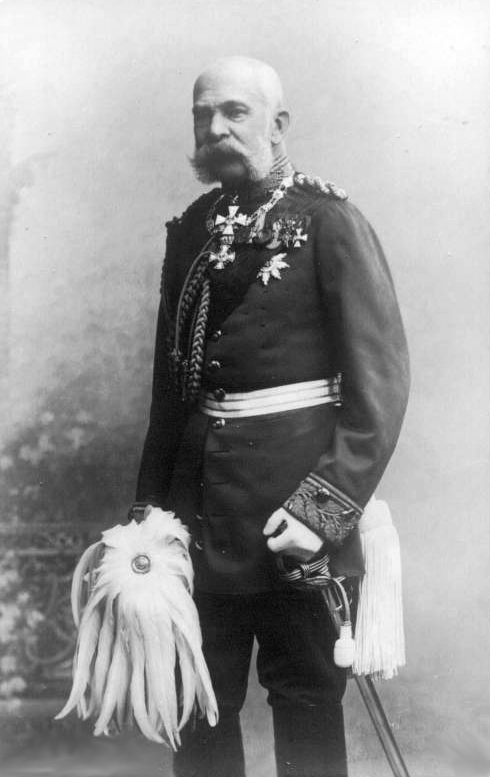
Emperor Franz Josef I of Austria-Hungary, wearing the uniform of a Prussian field marshal and the sash and star of the Order of the Black Eagle, c. 1900

- Franz Joseph I — Emperor of Austria (1848–1916)
- Frederik VIII of Denmark — King of Denmark (1906–1912)
- George V — King of Great Britain and Ireland, Emperor of India (1910–1936)
- Guangxu Emperor — Emperor of Qing Dynasty (1875–1908)
- Gustaf V of Sweden — King of Sweden (1907–1950)
- Gustaf VI Adolf of Sweden — Crown Prince, later King of Sweden (1950–1973)
- Leopold I, Prince of Anhalt-Dessau — Prussian field marshal known as the "Old Dessauer"
- Leopold II of Belgium — King of the Belgians (1865–1909).
- Louis XVIII — King of France (1814-1815, 1815-1824).
- Ludwig II of Bavaria — King of Bavaria (1864–1886).
- Ludwig III of Bavaria — Last king of Bavaria
- Prince Maximilian of Baden – heir to the Grand Duchy of Baden (1867–1929) – invested 18 January 1903
- Grand Duke Mikhail Aleksandrovich of Russia — Tsar Nicholas II's brother, Tsar presumptive sometimes referred to as "Tsar for a day" (15–16 March 1917) who was also the regimental chief of Ulanen-Regiment "Kaiser Alexander III von Rußland" (Westpreußisches) Nr. 1.
- Emperor Meiji – Emperor of Japan (1867–1912).
- Mozaffar ad-Din Shah — Shah of Persia (1896–1907) — 29 May 1902 — during the visit to Berlin of the Shah
- Naser al-Din Shah Qajar — Shah of Persia (1848–1896).
- Count Oscar Bernadotte of Wisborg — former Prince Oscar of Sweden (1859–1953)
- Nicholas II — Last Emperor of the Russian Empire.
- Duke Nicholas of Württemberg (1833–1903) — heir presumptive to the throne of Württemberg – invested with the order 18 January 1900
- Oscar I — King of Sweden and Norway (1844–1859)
- Oscar II — King of Sweden (1872–1907) and Norway (1872-1905)
- Rupprecht, Crown Prince of Bavaria — Last crown prince of Bavaria and First World War German field marshal
- Emperor Taishō — Emperor of Japan (1912–1926).
- Umberto I of Italy — King of Italy (1878–1900).
- Victor Emmanuel III — king of Italy (1900–1946).
- Prince Vilhelm, Duke of Södermanland — Prince of Sweden (1884–1965)
- William III of the Netherlands — King of the Netherlands and Grand Duke of Luxembourg (1849–1890).
- William IV — King of Great Britain and Ireland (1830–1837)
- Gojong of Korea — Emperor of Korea (1863–1907)
- Abdul Hamid II - Sultan of the Ottoman Empire

=== Knights of the Order ===
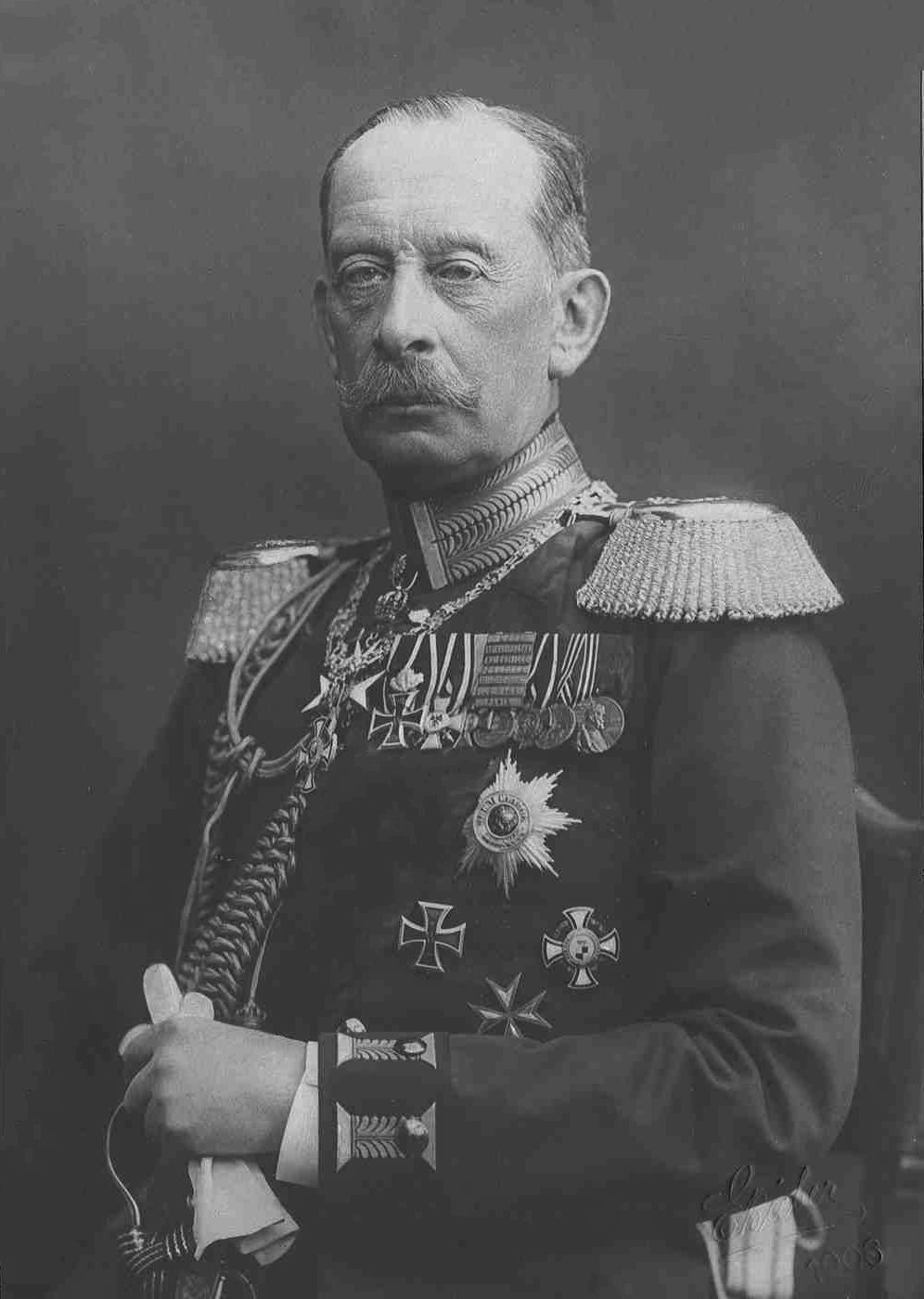
Graf Alfred von Schlieffen in 1906

- Henning Alexander von Kleist (1677–1749) — Prussian general, field marshal, for action at the Battle of Mollwitz.
- George Keith (1692/93-1778) - 10th Earl Marischal of Scotland, and Confidante of Friedrich the Great, Ambassador of Prussia to France and Great Britain.
- Friedrich von Beck-Rzikowsky (1830–1920), Austrian field marshal, chief of the general staff of the Imperial and Royal Army of Austria-Hungary, invested 19 September 1893
- Otto von Bismarck (1815-1898) — Prussian chancellor and statesman
- Gebhard von Blücher (1742-1819) — Prussian field marshal and leader of Prussian troops at the Battle of Leipzig and Battle of Waterloo.
- Wilhelm Malte I of Putbus (1677–1749) — Swedish-German aristocrat, prussian general, for his dedication and skillful leadership of the province of New West Pomerania and of Rügen.
- Joachim von Blumenthal (1720-1800) — Prussian War and Finance Minister, received the order in 1787
- Leonhardt von Blumenthal (1810-1900) — Prussian field-marshal, 1877.
- General von Bock und Polack – invested 18 January 1903
- Bernhard von Bülow (1849-1929) — German chancellor and statesman.
- Karl von Bülow (1846-1921) — Prussian general — invested with the order 18 January 1900
- General Mikhail Chertkov (sometimes written Tchertkoff) (1829-1905) — Russian Governor-General of Warsaw — September 1902 — when he visited Posen for German army maneuvers.
- Wilhelm René de l'Homme de Courbière (1733-1811) — Prussian field marshal
- Adolf von Deines (1845-1911) - Prussian General of the Cavalry and aide-de-camp to Wilhelm II.
- General Edler von der Planitz – invested 18 January 1903
- Karl von Einem — World War I-era German general and Minister of War.
- Prince Philip of Eulenburg — German politician and diplomat.
- Count Albrecht Konrad Finck von Finckenstein — Prussian field marshal under Frederick William I of Prussia
- Count Karl-Wilhelm Finck von Finckenstein — Prussian Prime Minister under Frederic the Great
- Friedrich Wilhelm Quirin von Forcade de Biaix — Prussian lieutenant general under Frederic the Great
- Johann Quirin von Forcade de Biaix — Prussian lieutenant general under Frederick William I of Prussia
- August von Gneisenau — Napoleonic-era Prussian field marshal. His insignia of the order was formerly Napoleon's.
- Gottlieb Graf von Haeseler — German field marshal.
- Paul von Hindenburg — World War I-era German field marshal and later president of Germany.
- Friedrich Graf Kleist von Nollendorf — Napoleonic-era Prussian general (promoted to field marshal two days before his death).
- Prince Hermann von Hatzfeldt — Prussian statesman and Chief President of Silesia.
- Hans von Köster – German Grand Admiral – 18 September 1902
- General von Lignitz – invested 18 January 1903
- August von Mackensen — World War I-era German field marshal.
- Patrice de Mac-Mahon, duc de Magenta — French politician; second president of the Third Republic.
- Edwin von Manteuffel (1809–1885) — Prussian field-marshal
- Adolph Menzel — German artist.
- Helmuth von Moltke the Elder — Prussian field marshal of the German wars of unification. Served as chancellor of the Order of the Black Eagle.
- Napoleon Bonaparte — Admitted in 1803 when he was First Consul.
- Frederick Sleigh Roberts, 1st Earl Roberts — British Commander-in-Chief of the Forces — Received the Order in 1901
- Ernst von Pfuel — Prussian general and Prime Minister of Prussia.
- Albrecht von Roon (1803-1879) — Prussian field marshal and Minister.
- Count Alfred von Schlieffen — German field marshal and strategist
- Gustav von Senden-Bibran an admiral of the German Imperial Navy
- Friedrich Wilhelm von Seydlitz — Prussian cavalry general under Frederick the Great.
- Friedrich Sixt von Armin — World War I-era German general.
- Alexander Suvorov — Napoleonic-era Russian general and Generalissimo.
- Ernst von Tettau (1644–1711) — General in Danish, Brandenburg, and Dutch service.
- Karl von Thielen – Prussian Minister for Public works – invested 18 January 1903
- Alfred von Tirpitz — German Admiral.
- Alfred von Waldersee — German field marshal and Supreme Commander of the Eight-Nation Alliance in the Boxer Rebellion.
- Ludwig Yorck von Wartenburg — Napoleonic-era Prussian field marshal.
- Karl von Wedel – Prussian general and diplomat (1842–1919) – invested 18 January 1903
- Johann Jakob von Wunsch (1717-1788) — Wuerttemberg-born Prussian general.
- Giuseppe Zanardelli (1826-1903) — Italian Minister-President — in August 1902, in connection with the visit to Germany of King Victor Emmanuel III of Italy
- Duke of Terceira, Prime Minister of Portugal
- Grand Duke George Alexandrovich of Russia (1871-1899) — younger brother and initial heir of Emperor Nicholas II of Russia
- Eduard von Simson (1810-1899) – German jurist, President of the Frankfurt Parliament (1848–1849), President of the North German Confederation's Parliament (1867–1871), President of Reichstag (1871–1887), President of the Supreme Court of Justice (Reichsgericht) (1877–1891)

== Current usage ==
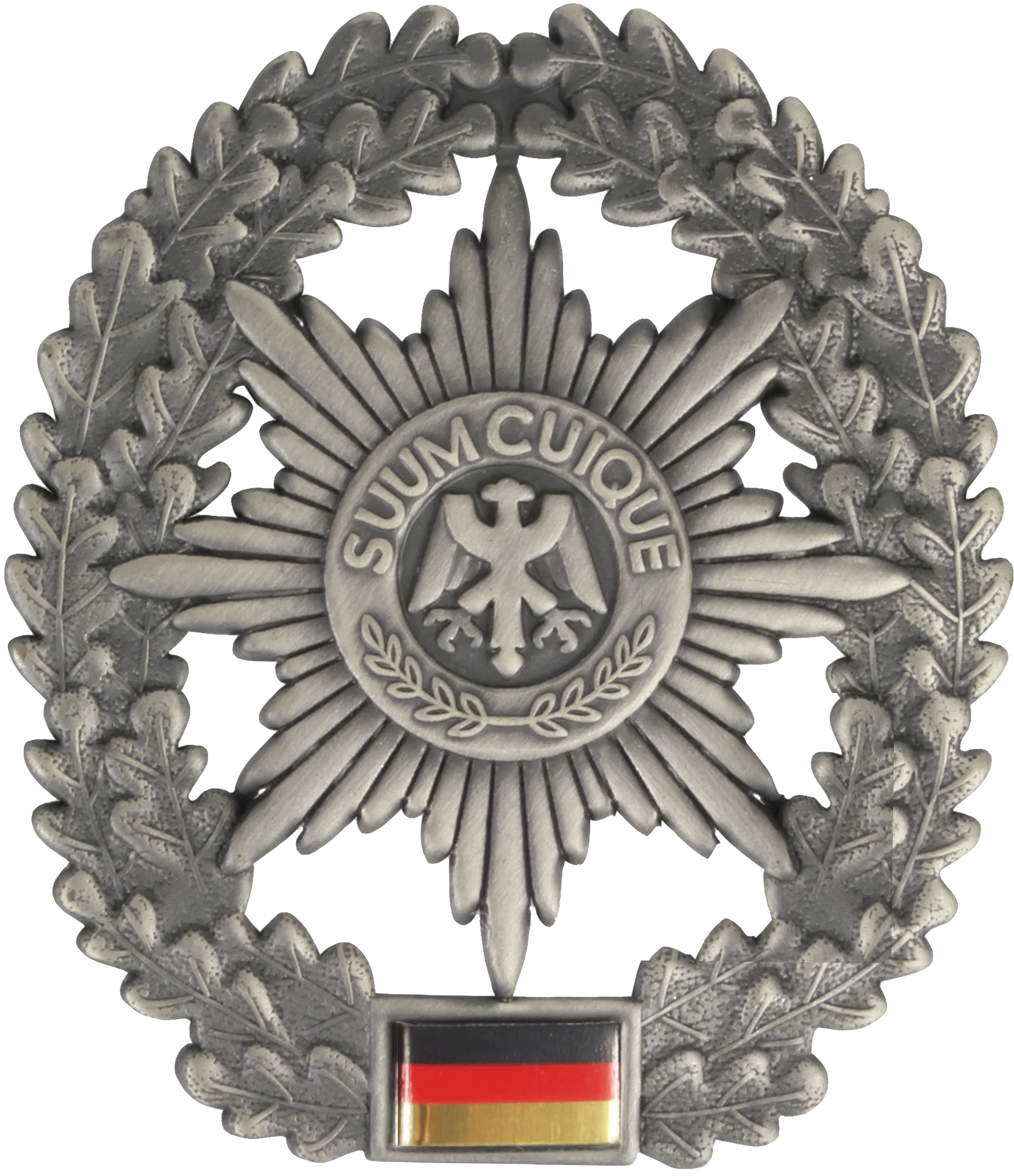
Feldjäger emblem

The Order of the Black Eagle is currently used as the emblem of the German Military Police (Feldjäger).
