= Kwakowo, Pomeranian Voivodeship =

Kwakowo
- Village
- Location within Poland
- Coordinates: 54°22′7″N 17°1′32″E
- Country: Poland
- Voivodeship: Pomeranian
- County: Słupsk
- Gmina: Kobylnica
- Population: 576

Kwakowo [kfaˈkɔvɔ] (German: Quackenburg) is a village in the administrative district of Gmina Kobylnica, within Słupsk County, Pomeranian Voivodeship, in northern Poland.

The estate was a property of the von Blumenthal family. For the history of the region, see History of Pomerania.

== People ==
- Joachim von Blumenthal (1720-1800), Prussian politician
