= Werner E. Ablaß =

German politician

- Born: Werner Erich Ablaß; 11 December 1946 (age 79); Briesen, Brandenburg, Germany
- Occupation: Politician
- Political party: DA (1990); CDU (from 1990)
- Spouse: Judith _____ (1986)

Werner E. Ablaß (born 11 December 1946) is a German politician who was a Christian oppositionist in East Germany (GDR). Together with Minister Rainer Eppelmann, Secretary of State in the Ministerium für Abrüstung und Verteidigung (MfAuV), Ablaß played a major role in the closure of the National People's Army (NVA) during the German reunification.

== History ==
Ablaß was born on 11 December 1946, the son of a carpenter in Briesen. He was brought up as a Christian. From 1953 to 1963, he attended the Polytechnic Secondary School in Briesen. He then worked for five years as a carer in a diaconal institution in Züssow. From 1969 to 1972, he was active as a bookseller in Potsdam, before working at the GDR state insurance. Ablaß was removed from the office in 1985, as he made a relocation request to West Germany, but which he later cancelled. He then worked for two years as a cleaner in the church advanced seminar in Hermannswerder, before he was again hired by the state insurance in early 1987. From 1987 to early 1990, he headed a Protestant retirement home in Camin, Mecklenburg.

Ablaß was the co-founder of the party Democratic Awakening in Mecklenburg and in April 1990, he became Deputy to the Minister and State Secretary in the Ministerium für Abrüstung und Verteidigung (Ministry for disarmament and defense)of the GDR. He served there as a negotiator for the Einigungsvertrag (Unification Treaty)and was involved in the negotiations on the withdrawal of the GDR from the Warsaw Pact. From October 1990 to December 1996, he headed the branch office of the Federal Ministry of Defence in Strausberg. Since 1997, Ablaß has been an appointed to specific functions in the field of the Bundeswehr in the "new federal states" (former East Germany). In 1997, he was awarded the Bundesverdienstkreuz.
