= Madlitz-Wilmersdorf =

- Municipality
- Interactive map of Madlitz-Wilmersdorf
- Location within Germany Location within Brandenburg
- Coordinates: 52°23′N 14°17′E
- Country: Germany
- State: Brandenburg
- District: Oder-Spree
- Disbanded: 2014

Area
  - Total: 45.11 km^{2} (17.42 sq mi)
- Elevation: 65 m (213 ft)

Population (2012-12-31)
  - Total: 678
  - Density: 15.0/km^{2} (38.9/sq mi)
- Time zone: UTC+01:00 (CET)
  - Summer (DST): UTC+02:00 (CEST)
- Postal codes: 15518
- Dialling codes: 033607
- Vehicle registration: LOS

Madlitz-Wilmersdorf (German pronunciation: [ˈmaːdlɪts ˈvɪlmɐsdɔʁf]) is a former municipality in the Oder-Spree district, in Brandenburg, Germany. It is situated at the Spree river, southwest of Berlin. Since 1 January 2014, it is part of the municipality Briesen.

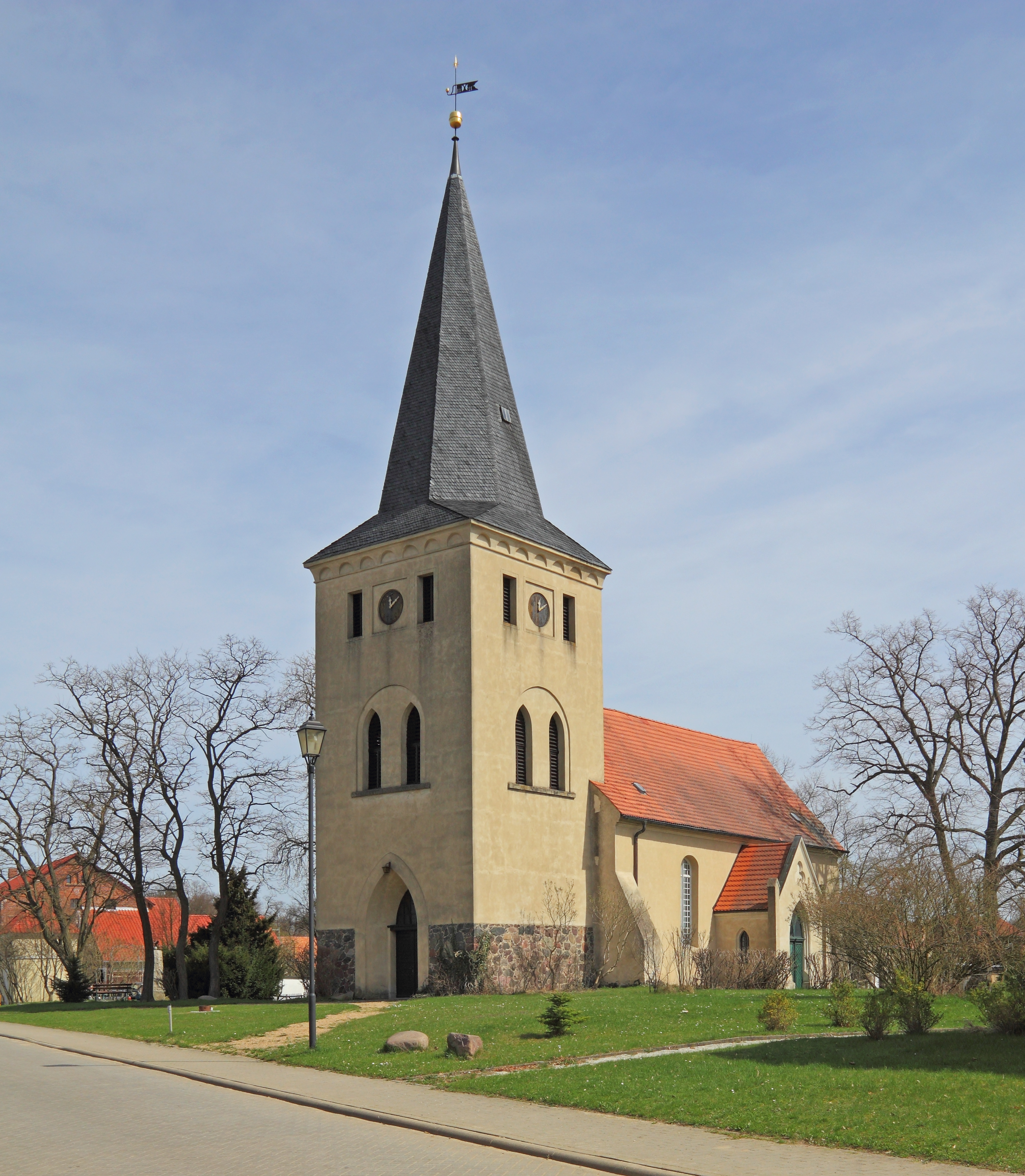
Village church in Alt-Madlitz

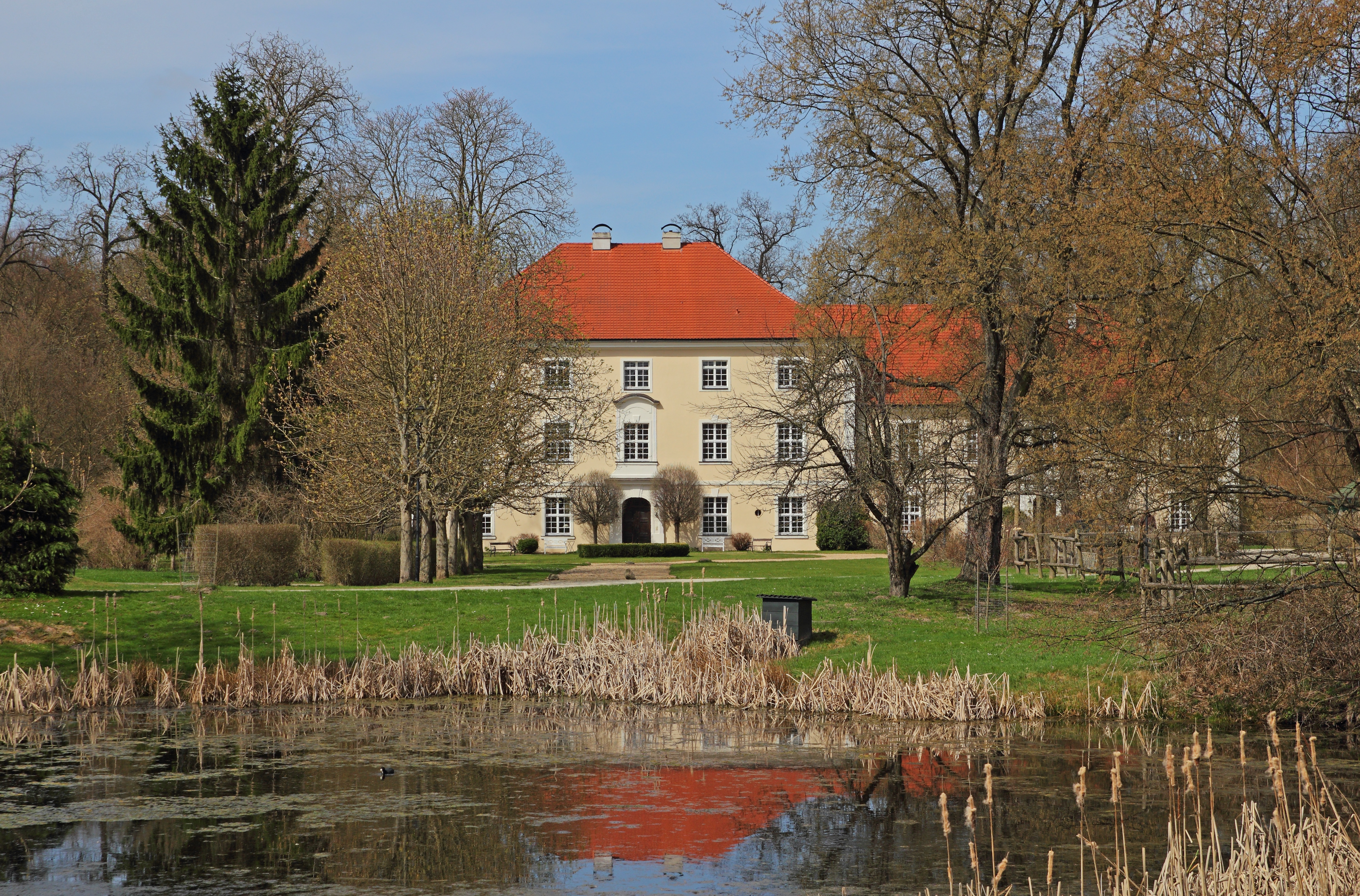
Alt-Madlitz Manor

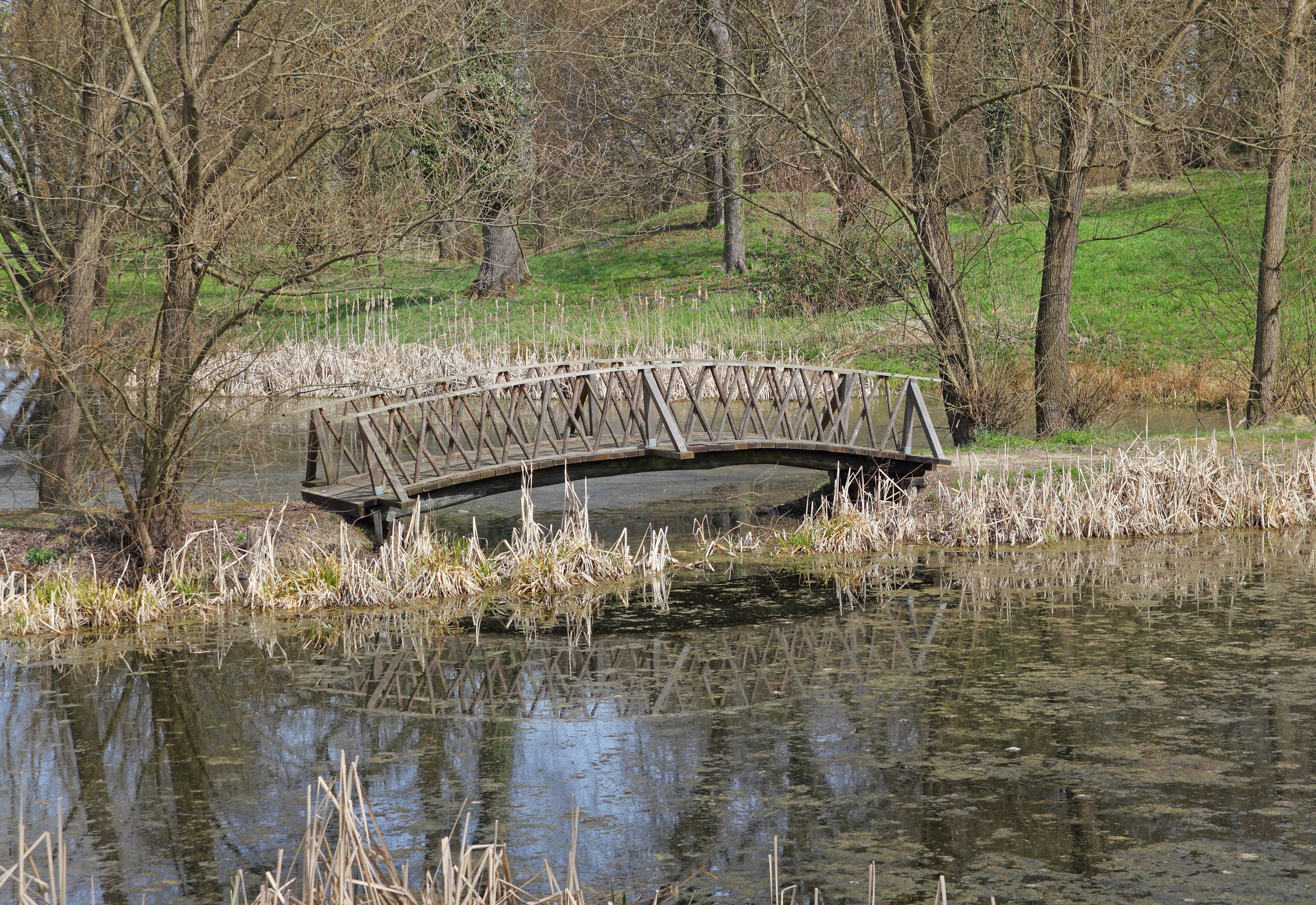
Country park at the manor
