= Joachim von Blumenthal =

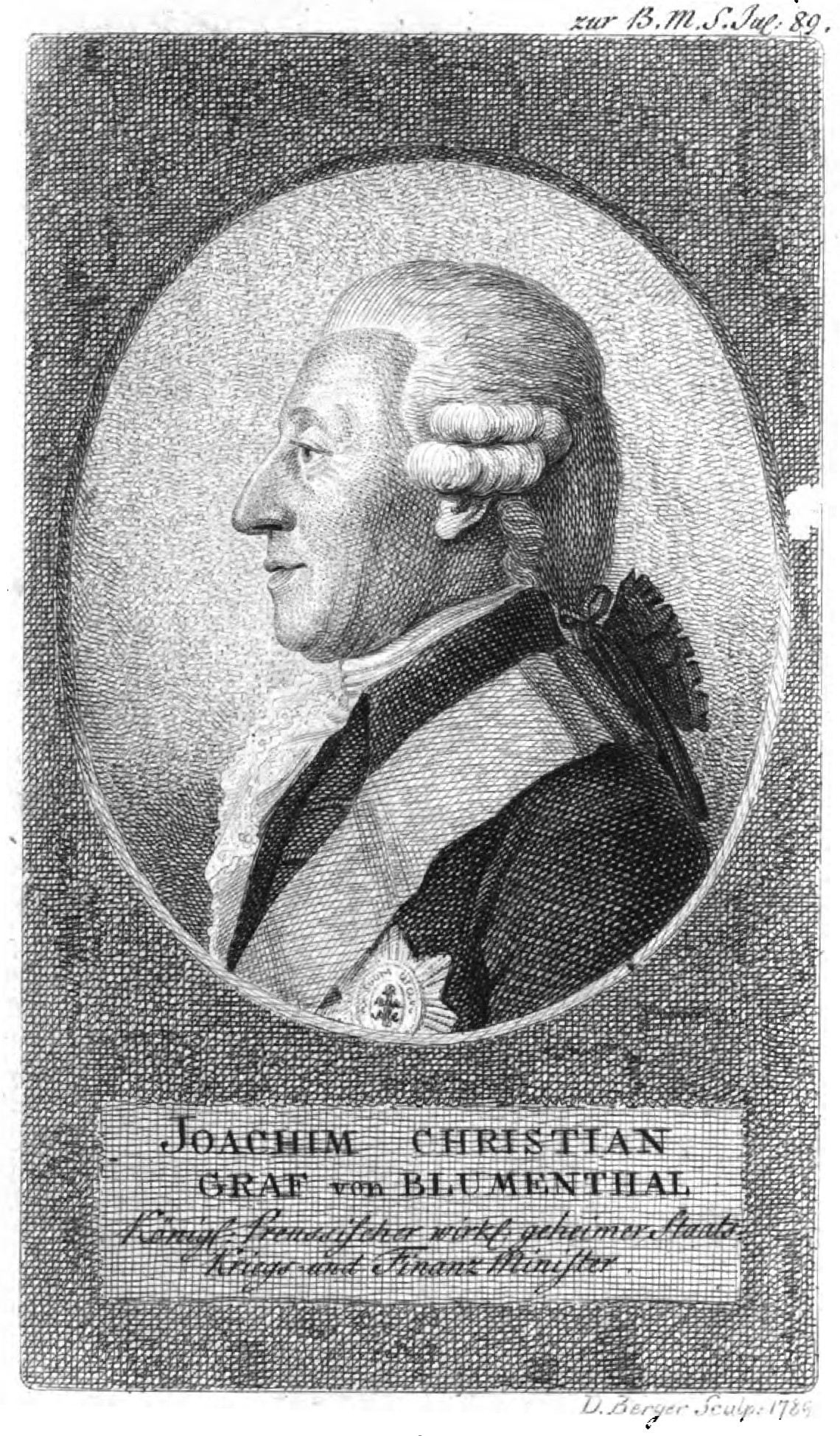
Joachim Christian von Blumenthal, Prussian War and Treasury Minister until his death in 1800

Joachim Christian, Count von Blumenthal (6 December 1720 in Quackenburg – 17 March 1800 in Berlin) succeeded his uncle Ludwig von Blumenthal as President of the Prussian General War and Finance Directory (effectively Minister War and Finance) of Prussia and remained so until the time of the Napoleonic Wars.

His parents were Heinrich Albrecht von Blumenthal (1693–1767), Lord of Quackenburg, and Katharina von Lettow (1702–1743). His brothers Georg von Blumenthal und Werner (1725–1804) were both senior officers in the Prussian Army.

Blumenthal was lord of Steinhöfel (Brandenburg), Groß Möllen (Pomerania), Loiste and various other estates. He entered the Prussian Civil Service. In 1743 he was a "Councillor" of the War and Domains Directory, where he worked in Gumbinnen before being transferred to Königsberg in 1746. In 1755 he became President of the War and Domains Chamber in Magdeburg, where he caught the eye of Friedrich the Great who in 1763 appointed him Privy State and War Counsellor and presiding Minister of the General War and Finance Directory as well as Vice President of the General Finance, War and Domains Directory in Berlin. He was also responsible for the Provinces of Prussia and Lithuania, as well as the salt business.

Frederick William II. elevated him to Count on 2 October 1786 together with his cousin Hans von Blumenthal, in a single patent and grant of arms.

In December 1786 Mirabeau wrote "Blumenthal is a faithful accountant, an ignorant Minister; ambitious, when he recollects ambition, and to please his family; and full of respect for the Treasury, which he places far above the State; and of indifference for the King, whom he more than neglected while he was Prince of Prussia."

However, in 1787 he received the Order of the Black Eagle and remained in charge of Prussia's finance ministry until 1800.

== Family ==
Blumenthal first married on 2 October 1749 Katharina Sophie Auguste von der Groeben (1728–1750), daughter of the minister of state Wilhelm Ludwig von der Groeben (1690–1760). They had the following children:

- Elisabeth Luise Wilhelmine Amalie Henriette (1760–1826), married Freiherr Ernst-Georg von Steinberg-Bodenberg (died 1797)
- Friederike Amalie Albertine (born 1765) married Friedrich Heinrich von Podewils (1746–1804)
- Ferdinand Friedrich Heinrich Christian (1765–1778)
- Charlotte Auguste Johanna Luise (1766–1835) married Valentin von Massow (1752–1817), High Marshal of Prussia und Intendant of the royal palaces; his father (also called Valentin) was a fellow-minister of Joachim von Blumenthal, elevated to the countship in the same year.

He married for the second time in 1781 Louise Wilhelmine von Polenz (1740–1792), daughter of Wilhelm von Polenz and Marie Elisabeth von Flanss.

== Sources ==
- Gottfried von Bülow: Blumenthal, Joachim Christian Graf von. In: Allgemeine Deutsche Biographie (ADB). Band 2. Duncker & Humblot, Leipzig 1875, page 751 f.
- Ernst Heinrich Kneschke: Neues allgemeines deutsches Adels-Lexicon. 1. Band, Friedrich Voigt, Leipzig 1859, pp 483–484.
- Walter von Hueck: Adelslexikon Band I (= Genealogisches Handbuch des Adels. Band 53). C. A. Starke Verlag, Limburg an der Lahn 1972, page 444.
