= Steinhöfel =

- Municipality
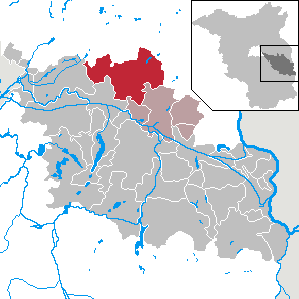
- Location of Steinhöfel within Oder-Spree district
- Interactive map of Steinhöfel
- Location within Germany Location within Brandenburg
- Coordinates: 52°23′59″N 14°10′00″E
- Country: Germany
- State: Brandenburg
- District: Oder-Spree
- Municipal assoc.: Odervorland
- Subdivisions: 12 districts

Government
  - Mayor (2024–29): Claudia Simon

Area
  - Total: 159.84 km^{2} (61.71 sq mi)
- Elevation: 52 m (171 ft)

Population (2025-12-31)
  - Total: 4,365
  - Density: 27.31/km^{2} (70.73/sq mi)
- Time zone: UTC+01:00 (CET)
  - Summer (DST): UTC+02:00 (CEST)
- Postal codes: 15518
- Dialling codes: 033636
- Vehicle registration: LOS
- Website: www.gemeinde-steinhoefel.de

Steinhöfel is a municipality in the Oder-Spree district, in Brandenburg, Germany. Since the beginning of 2019 it belongs to the collective municipality "Amt Odervorland"

The contemporary municipality of Steinhöfel comprises a total of twelve physical villages, namely Steinhöfel, Arensdorf, Beerfelde, Buchholz, Demnitz, Gölsdorf, Hasenfelde, Heinersdorf, Jänickendorf, Neuendorf im Sande, Schönfelde and Tempelberg.

== History ==
In 1774, the Prussian Minister of War and Treasury Joachim von Blumenthal purchased the estate of Steinhöfel, including a manor that was later expanded into a castle. When von Blumenthal died, the estate was inherited by his daughter Charlotte von Massow, whose husband the Court Marshal Valentin von Massow commissioned a rebuilding of the manor by the architect David Gilly. The property was inherited in turn by the couple's son Valentin von Massow who had served with Wellington in Spain and as one of his adjutants at Waterloo.

During the Seven Years' War, the castle's surroundings saw a brief visit by Frederick the Great resting his troops prior to the Battle of Kunersdorf. Later recreational visitors included Frederick William III of Prussia and Theodor Fontane who expressed considerable enthusiasm about the place.

The castle (de:Schloß Steinhöfel) today hosts a hotel and commercial venue under Cultural heritage regulations.

From 1815 to 1947, Steinhöfel was part of the Prussian Province of Brandenburg, from 1947 to 1952 of the State of Brandenburg, from 1952 to 1990 of the Bezirk Frankfurt of East Germany and since 1990 again of Brandenburg.

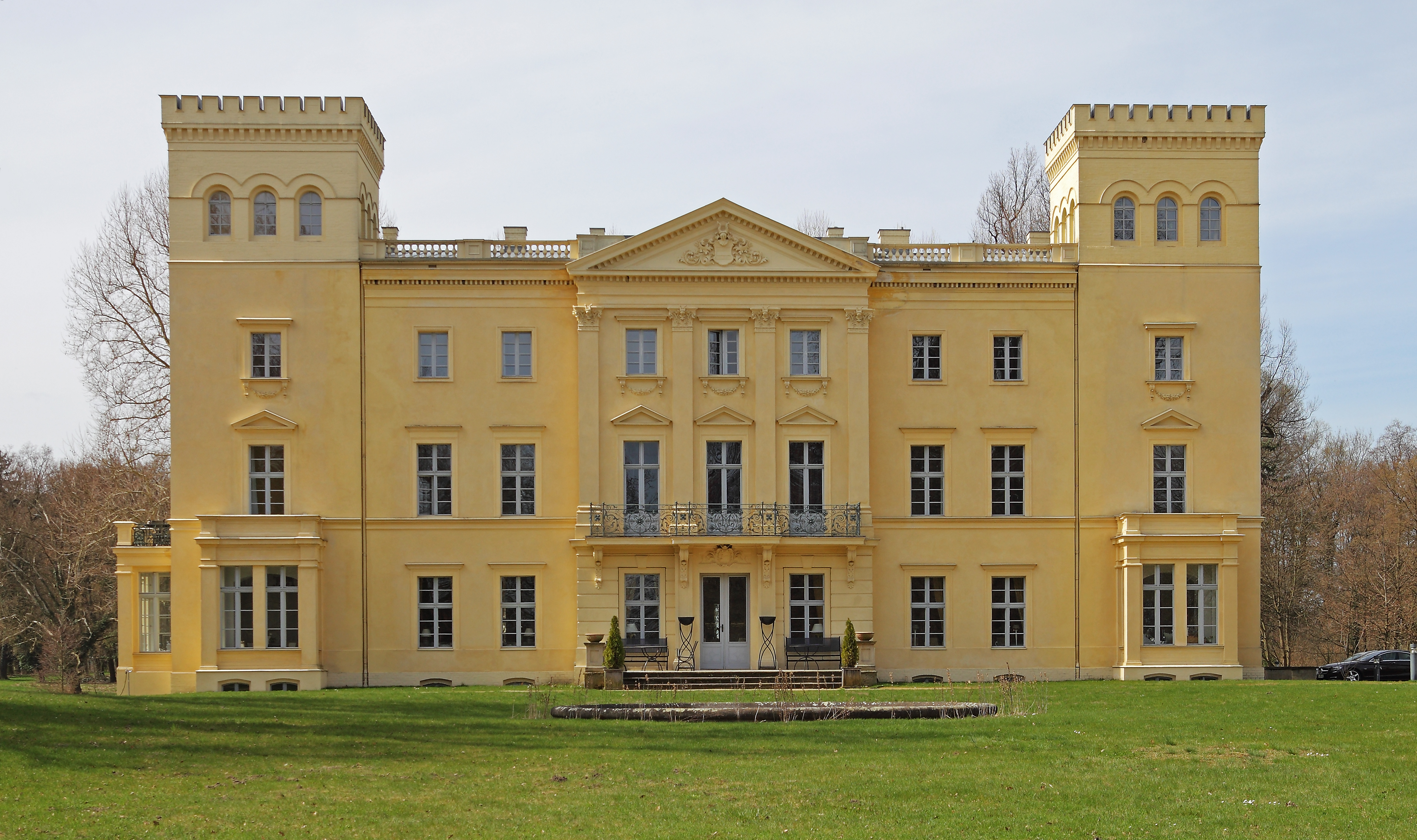
The castle as seen from the park side

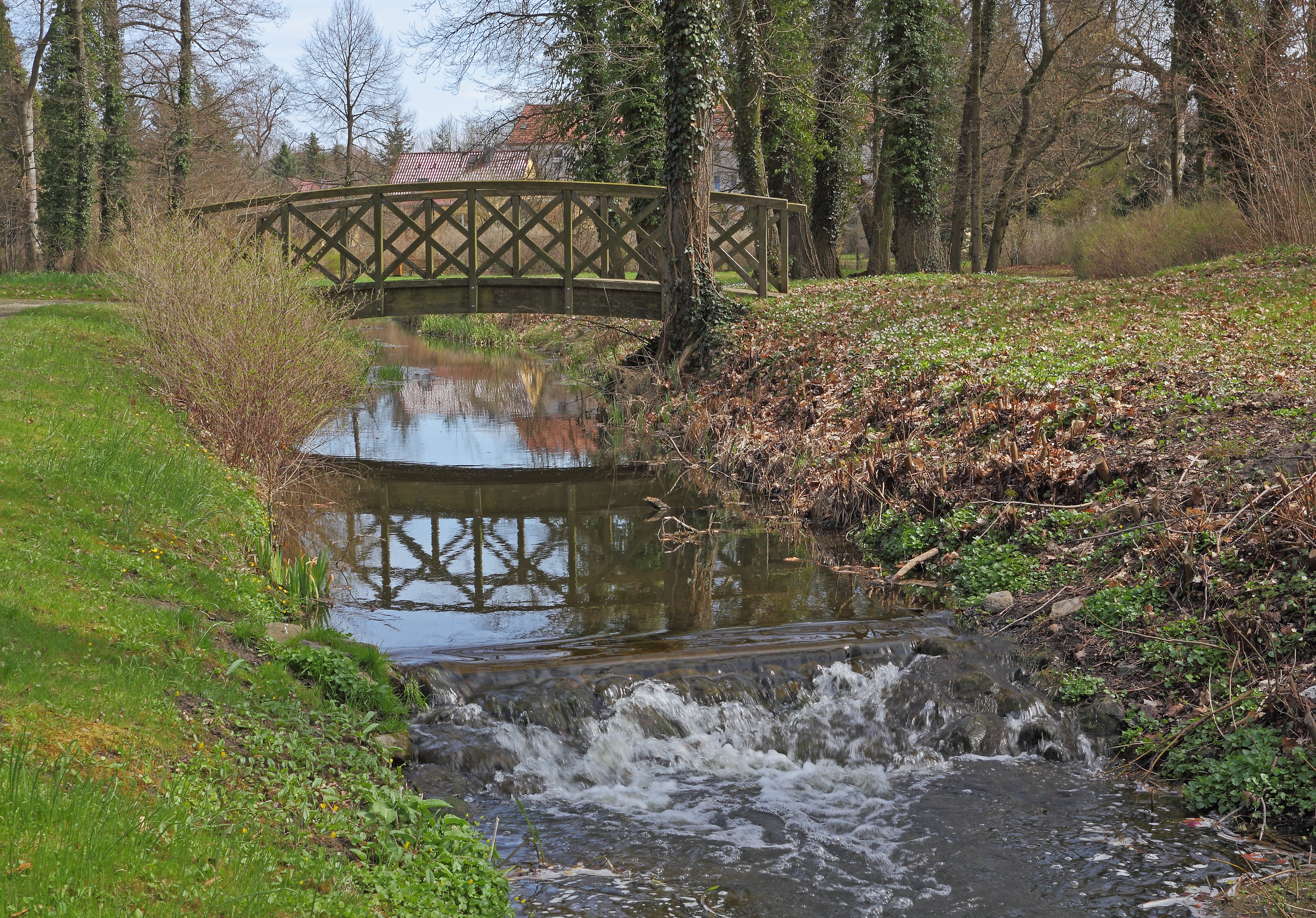
landscaped garden

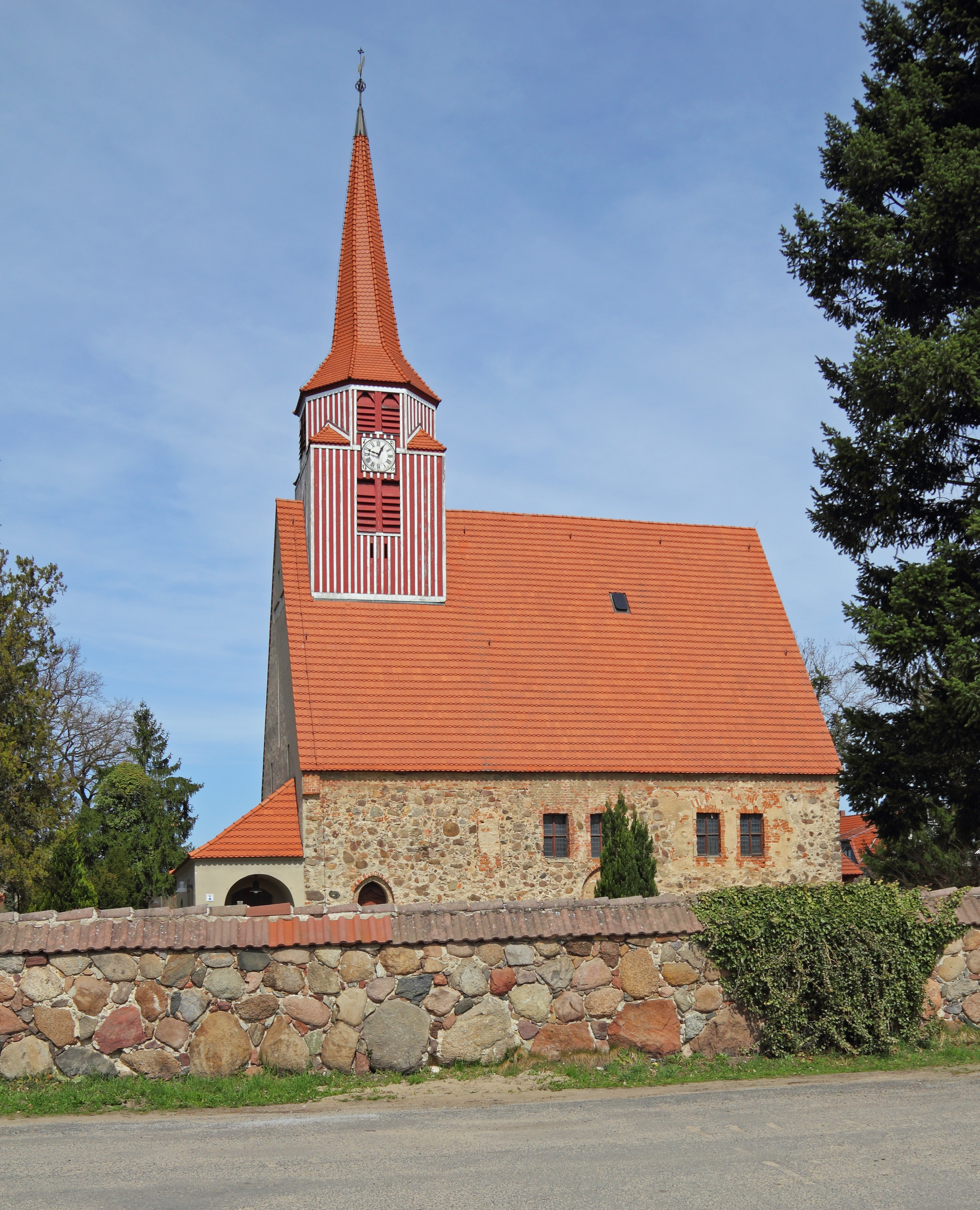
Demnitz (Steinhöfel), Village Lutheran Church

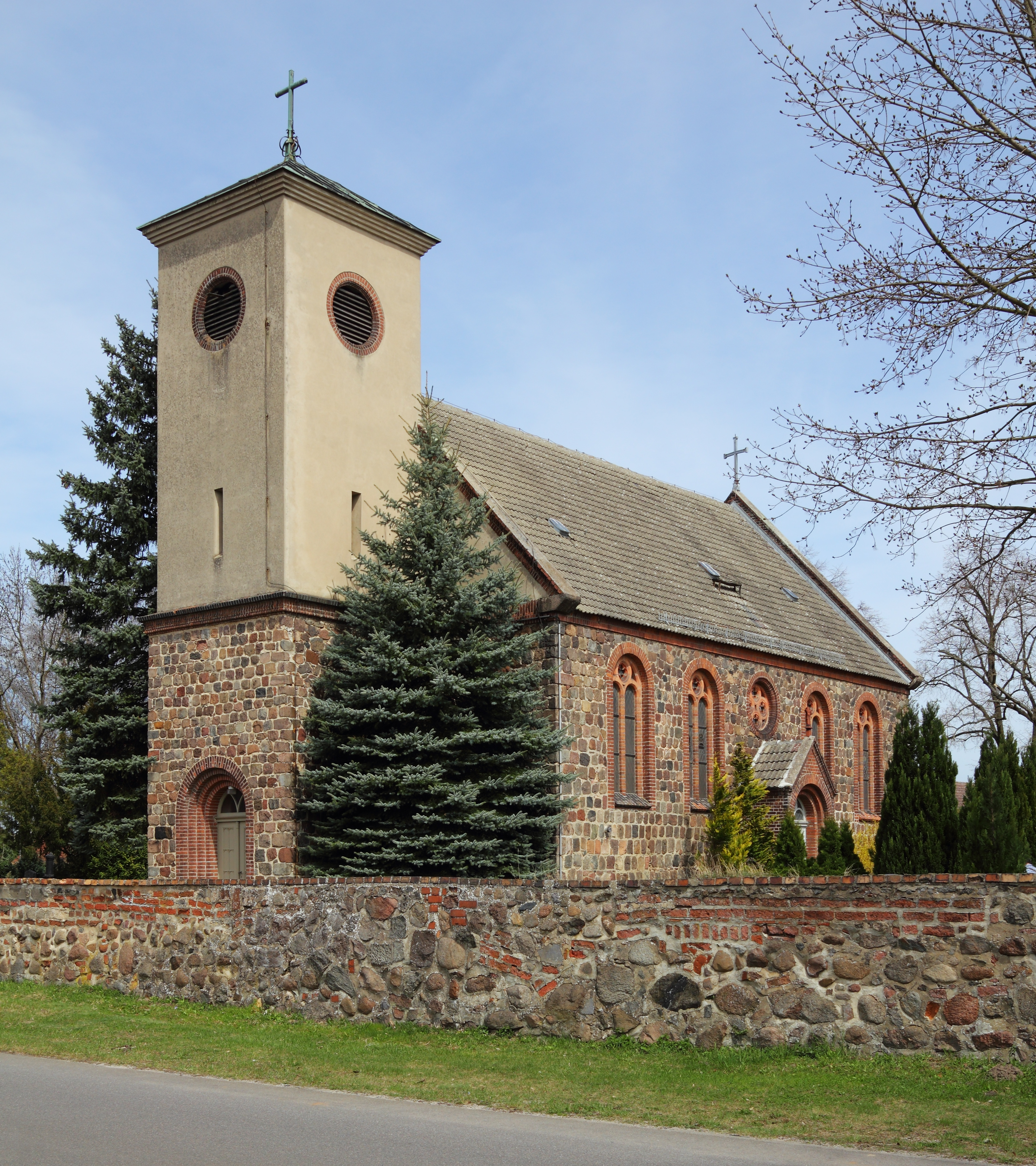
Neuendorf im Sande (Steinhöfel), village church

== Demography ==
Development of population since 1875 within the current Boundaries (Blue Line: Population; Dotted Line: Comparison to Population development in Brandenburg state; Grey Background: Time of Nazi Germany; Red Background: Time of communist East Germany)

Recent Population Development and Projections (Population Development before Census 2011 (blue line); Recent Population Development according to the Census in Germany in 2011 (blue bordered line); Official projections for 2005-2030 (yellow line); for 2014-2030 (red line); for 2017-2030 (scarlet line)

Steinhöfel: Population development
within the current boundaries (2017)

Year	Pop.	±% p.a.
1875	5,184	—
1890	4,700	−0.65%
1910	5,040	+0.35%
1925	5,159	+0.16%
1933	5,007	−0.37%
1939	4,609	−1.37%
1946	5,697	+3.07%
1950	6,196	+2.12%
1964	5,462	−0.90%
1971	5,569	+0.28%
1981	4,982	−1.11%
1985	4,848	−0.68%
1989	4,746	−0.53%
1990	4,717	−0.61%
1991	4,614	−2.18%

Year	Pop.	±% p.a.
1992	4,526	−1.91%
1993	4,671	+3.20%
1994	4,705	+0.73%
1995	4,700	−0.11%
1996	4,728	+0.60%
1997	4,711	−0.36%
1998	4,779	+1.44%
1999	4,762	−0.36%
2000	4,784	+0.46%
2001	4,739	−0.94%
2002	4,700	−0.82%
2003	4,687	−0.28%
2004	4,675	−0.26%
2005	4,647	−0.60%
2006	4,664	+0.37%

Year	Pop.	±% p.a.
2007	4,626	−0.81%
2008	4,597	−0.63%
2009	4,552	−0.98%
2010	4,507	−0.99%
2011	4,378	−2.86%
2012	4,322	−1.28%
2013	4,379	+1.32%
2014	4,377	−0.05%
2015	4,474	+2.22%
2016	4,371	−2.30%
2017	4,412	+0.94%
2018	4,448	+0.82%
2019	4,495	+1.06%
