= Odervorland =

- Amt
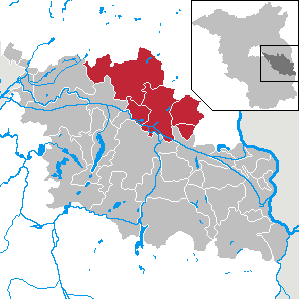
- Map of Oder-Spree highlighting Odervorland
- Interactive map of Odervorland
- Location within Germany Location within Brandenburg
- Coordinates: 52°21′N 14°17′E
- Country: Germany
- State: Brandenburg
- District: Oder-Spree
- Seat: Briesen
- Subdivisions: 4 municipalities

Area
  - Total: 340.57 km^{2} (131.49 sq mi)

Population (2025-12-31)
  - Total: 10,174
  - Density: 29.873/km^{2} (77.372/sq mi)
- Time zone: UTC+01:00 (CET)
  - Summer (DST): UTC+02:00 (CEST)
- Website: www.amt-odervorland.de

Amt Odervorland is an Amt ("collective municipality") in the district of Oder-Spree, in Brandenburg, Germany. Its seat is in Briesen.

The Amt Odervorland consists of the following municipalities:

1. Berkenbrück
2. Briesen
3. Jacobsdorf
4. Steinhöfel

== Demography ==
Development of Population since 1875 within the Current Boundaries (Blue Line: Population; Dotted Line: Comparison to Population Development of Brandenburg state; Grey Background: Time of Nazi rule; Red Background: Time of Communist rule)

Recent Population Development and Projections (Population Development before Census 2011 (blue line); Recent Population Development according to the Census in Germany in 2011 (blue bordered line); Official projections for 2005-2030 (yellow line); for 2017-2030 (scarlet line); for 2020-2030 (green line)

Amt Odervorland: Population development
within the current boundaries (2020)

Year	Pop.	±% p.a.
1875	10,292	—
1890	10,080	−0.14%
1910	10,571	+0.24%
1925	11,270	+0.43%
1939	10,851	−0.27%
1950	14,007	+2.35%
1964	12,251	−0.95%
1971	12,384	+0.15%
1981	10,830	−1.33%

Year	Pop.	±% p.a.
1985	10,424	−0.95%
1990	10,030	−0.77%
1995	10,010	−0.04%
2000	10,783	+1.50%
2005	10,742	−0.08%
2010	10,315	−0.81%
2015	10,141	−0.34%
2020	10,307	+0.33%
2025	10,174	−0.26%
