= Berkenbrück =

- Municipality
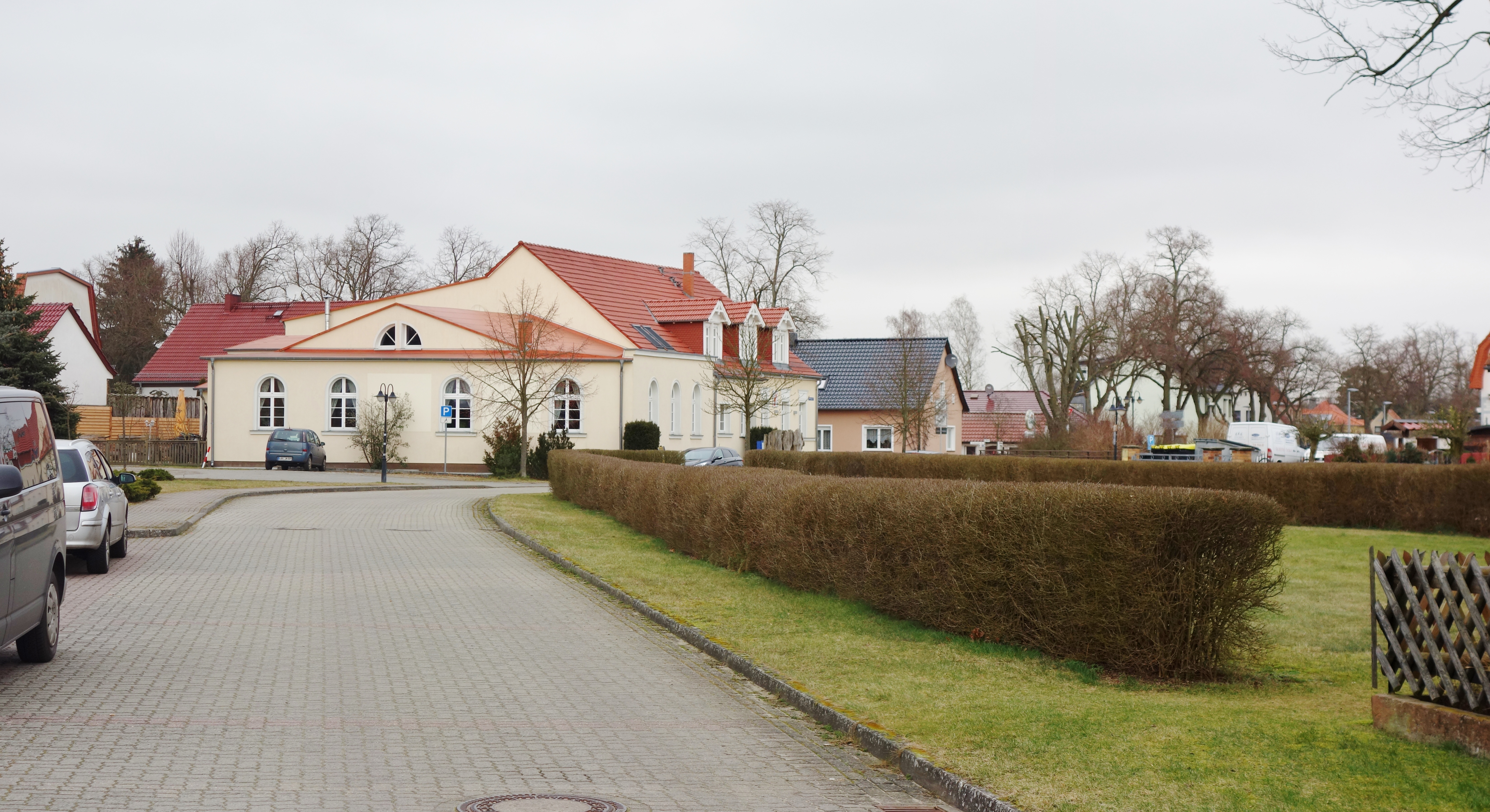
- Bürgerhaus Berkenbrück

- Coat of arms

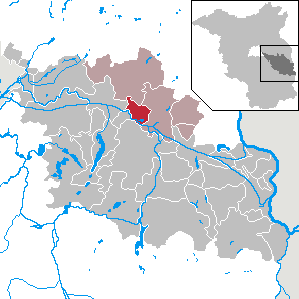
- Location of Berkenbrück within Oder-Spree district
- Interactive map of Berkenbrück
- Location within Germany Location within Brandenburg
- Coordinates: 52°21′00″N 14°09′00″E
- Country: Germany
- State: Brandenburg
- District: Oder-Spree
- Municipal assoc.: Odervorland

Government
  - Mayor (2024–29): Mirko Nowitzki

Area
  - Total: 17.71 km^{2} (6.84 sq mi)
- Elevation: 42 m (138 ft)

Population (2025-12-31)
  - Total: 1,072
  - Density: 60.53/km^{2} (156.8/sq mi)
- Time zone: UTC+01:00 (CET)
  - Summer (DST): UTC+02:00 (CEST)
- Postal codes: 15518
- Dialling codes: 033634
- Vehicle registration: LOS
- Website: www.berkenbrueck-spree.de

Berkenbrück is a municipality in the Oder-Spree district, in Brandenburg, Germany.

== History ==
From 1815 to 1947, Berkenbrück was part of the Prussian Province of Brandenburg, from 1947 to 1952 of the State of Brandenburg, from 1952 to 1990 of the Bezirk Frankfurt of East Germany and since 1990 again of Brandenburg.

== Personalities ==
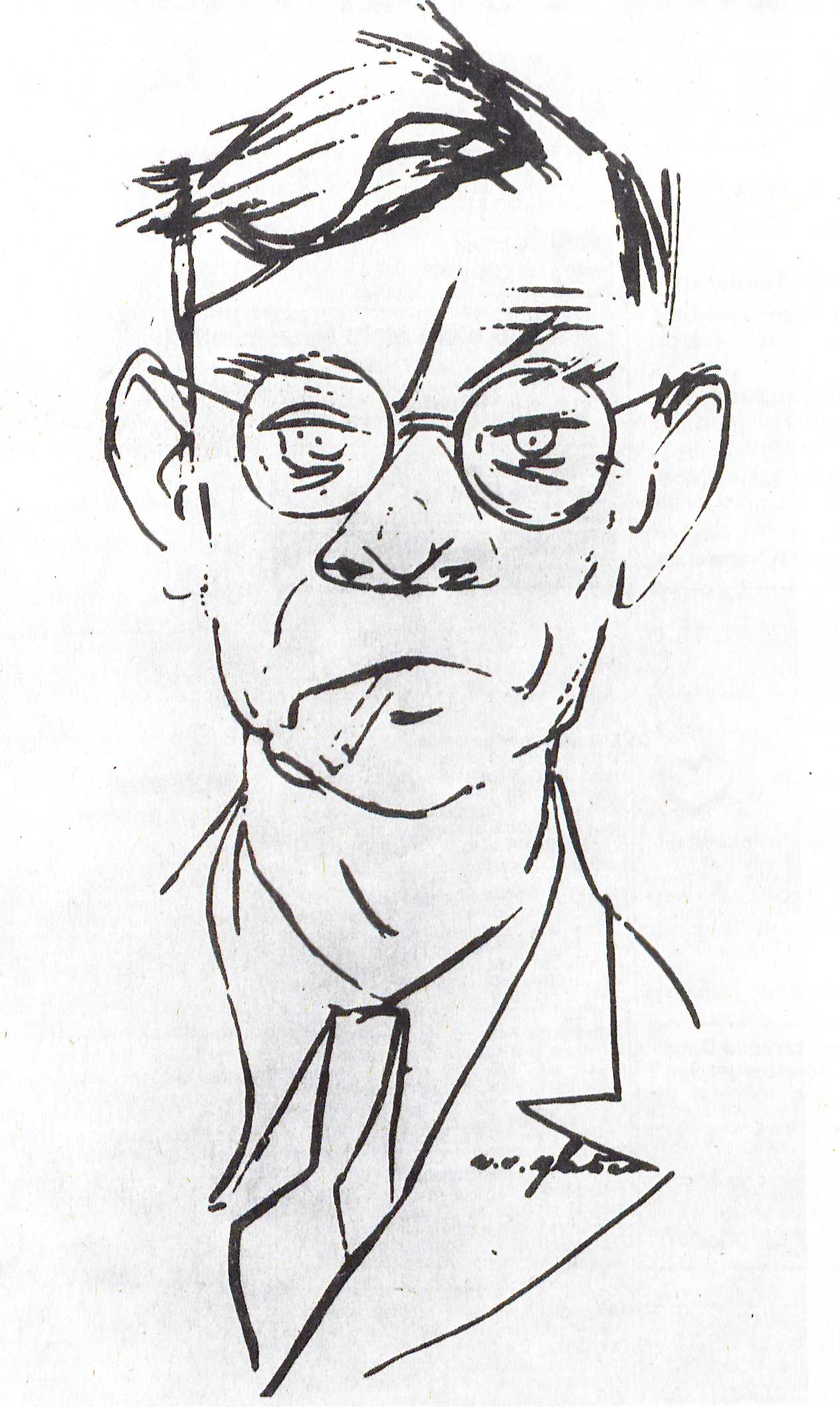
Hans Fallada in 1943 by Erich Ohser

- Hans Fallada (1893-1947), author, lived from 1932 to 1933 in Berkenbrück-Roterkrug

== Demography ==
Development of Population since 1875 within the Current Boundaries (Blue Line: Population; Dotted Line: Comparison to Population Development of Brandenburg state; Grey Background: Time of Nazi rule; Red Background: Time of Communist rule)

Berkenbrück: Population development
within the current boundaries (2013)

Year	Pop.	±% p.a.
1875	417	—
1890	481	+0.96%
1910	597	+1.09%
1925	806	+2.02%
1933	884	+1.16%
1939	1,033	+2.63%
1946	882	−2.23%
1950	972	+2.46%
1964	1,032	+0.43%
1971	1,042	+0.14%
1981	966	−0.75%
1985	917	−1.29%
1989	830	−2.46%
1990	807	−2.77%
1991	798	−1.12%
1992	828	+3.76%
1993	864	+4.35%
1994	918	+6.25%
1995	922	+0.44%
1996	921	−0.11%

Year	Pop.	±% p.a.
1997	917	−0.43%
1998	944	+2.94%
1999	976	+3.39%
2000	978	+0.20%
2001	1,002	+2.45%
2002	1,002	+0.00%
2003	1,013	+1.10%
2004	1,003	−0.99%
2005	1,017	+1.40%
2006	1,002	−1.47%
2007	1,014	+1.20%
2008	1,028	+1.38%
2009	1,023	−0.49%
2010	1,003	−1.96%
2011	999	−0.40%
2012	985	−1.40%
2013	972	−1.32%
2014	996	+2.47%
2015	998	+0.20%
2016	1,005	+0.70%
