= Briesen (Mark) =

- Municipality
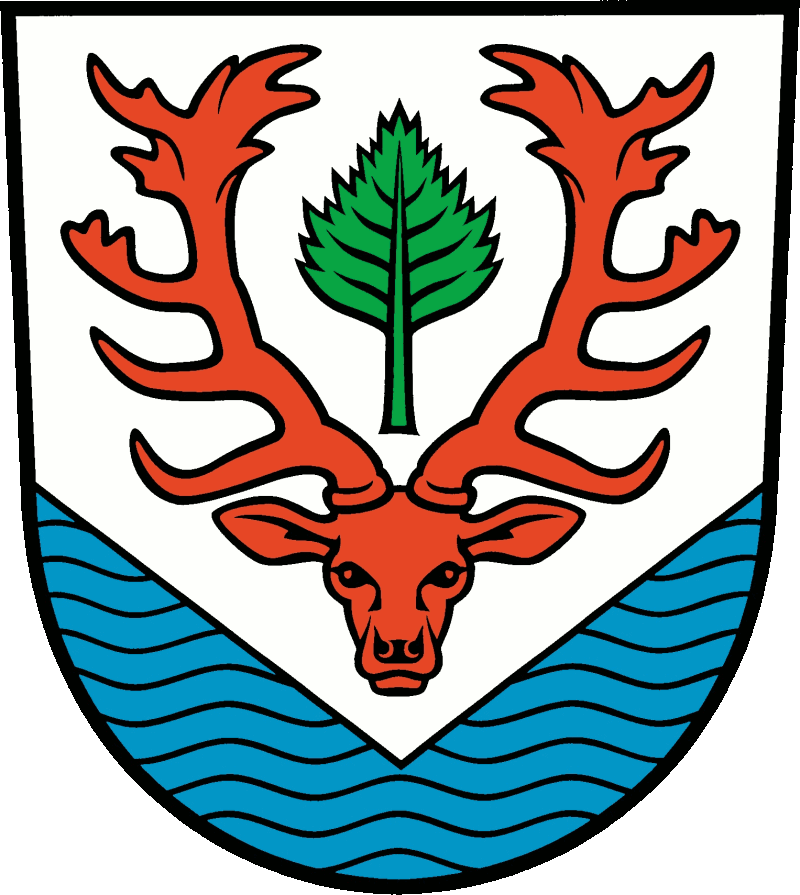
- Coat of arms

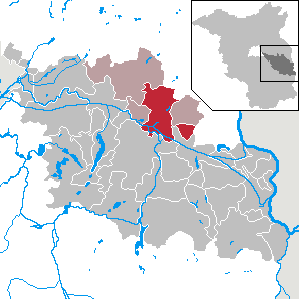
- Location of Briesen (Mark) within Oder-Spree district
- Interactive map of Briesen (Mark)
- Location within Germany Location within Brandenburg
- Coordinates: 52°20′N 14°17′E
- Country: Germany
- State: Brandenburg
- District: Oder-Spree
- Municipal assoc.: Odervorland

Government
  - Mayor (2024–29): Jan Kliemt

Area
  - Total: 111.66 km^{2} (43.11 sq mi)
- Elevation: 43 m (141 ft)

Population (2025-12-31)
  - Total: 2,944
  - Density: 26.37/km^{2} (68.29/sq mi)
- Time zone: UTC+01:00 (CET)
  - Summer (DST): UTC+02:00 (CEST)
- Postal codes: 15518
- Dialling codes: 033607, 033635
- Vehicle registration: LOS
- Website: www.briesen-mark.de

Briesen (Mark) (German pronunciation: [ˈbʁiːzn̩]) is a village and a municipality in the Oder-Spree district, Brandenburg, Germany. It is situated east of the capital Berlin, between the towns Fürstenwalde and Frankfurt an der Oder. Briesen was first mentioned in 1403.

== History ==
From 1815 to 1947, Briesen was part of the Prussian Province of Brandenburg, from 1947 to 1952 of the State of Brandenburg, from 1952 to 1990 of the Bezirk Frankfurt of East Germany and since 1990 again of Brandenburg.

== Local government ==
Since 2014 the municipality Briesen consists of the villages Alt Madlitz, Biegen, Briesen, Falkenberg and Wilmersdorf. It is part of Amt Odervorland. Its governing council, dealing with local affairs, consists of 12 seats.

== Demography ==
Development of population since 1875 within the current boundaries (blue line: population; dotted line: comparison to population development of Brandenburg state; grey background: time of Nazi rule; red background: time of communist rule)

Briesen (mark): population development
within the current boundaries (2013)

| Year | Pop. | ±% p.a. |
|---|---|---|
| 1875 | 2,753 | — |
| 1890 | 3,132 | +0.86% |
| 1910 | 3,025 | −0.17% |
| 1925 | 3,419 | +0.82% |
| 1933 | 3,425 | +0.02% |
| 1939 | 3,401 | −0.12% |
| 1946 | 3,931 | +2.09% |
| 1950 | 4,309 | +2.32% |
| 1964 | 3,647 | −1.18% |
| 1971 | 3,681 | +0.13% |
| 1981 | 3,234 | −1.29% |
| 1985 | 3,127 | −0.84% |
| 1989 | 3,039 | −0.71% |
| 1990 | 3,018 | −0.69% |
| 1991 | 3,004 | −0.46% |
| 1992 | 2,956 | −1.60% |
| 1993 | 2,939 | −0.58% |
| 1994 | 2,881 | −1.97% |
| 1995 | 2,892 | +0.38% |
| 1996 | 2,910 | +0.62% |

| Year | Pop. | ±% p.a. |
|---|---|---|
| 1997 | 2,943 | +1.13% |
| 1998 | 2,973 | +1.02% |
| 1999 | 3,026 | +1.78% |
| 2000 | 3,078 | +1.72% |
| 2001 | 3,061 | −0.55% |
| 2002 | 3,099 | +1.24% |
| 2003 | 3,109 | +0.32% |
| 2004 | 3,101 | −0.26% |
| 2005 | 3,091 | −0.32% |
| 2006 | 3,055 | −1.16% |
| 2007 | 3,038 | −0.56% |
| 2008 | 2,985 | −1.74% |
| 2009 | 2,934 | −1.71% |
| 2010 | 2,925 | −0.31% |
| 2011 | 2,863 | −2.12% |
| 2012 | 2,870 | +0.24% |
| 2013 | 2,825 | −1.57% |
| 2014 | 2,827 | +0.07% |
| 2015 | 2,806 | −0.74% |
| 2016 | 2,783 | −0.82% |

== Notable people ==
- Werner E. Ablaß (born 1946), German politician
