= Lubieszyn, West Pomeranian Voivodeship =

Lubieszyn
- Hamlet
- Location within Poland
- Coordinates: 53°26′59″N 14°23′15″E
- Country: Poland
- Voivodeship: West Pomeranian
- County: Police
- Municipality: Dobra Szczecińska
- Village assembly: Wąwelnica
- Population (2021): 85
- Time zone: UTC+1 (CET)
  - Summer (DST): UTC+2 (CEST)
- Postal code: 72-002
- Area code: +48 91
- Car plates: ZPL

Lubieszyn (Polish: [luˈbjɛ.ʂɘ̟n]; German until 1945: Marienhof [maˈʁiː.ənˌhoːf]) is a hamlet in the West Pomeranian Voivodeship, Poland, located within the municipality of Dobra Szczecińska in Police County. It forms a suburb of the village of Wąwelnica, and belongs to its village assembly. The hamlet is located on the Ueckermünde Plain, near the Germany–Poland border. In 2021, it had 85 residents.
