= Kościno =

- Village
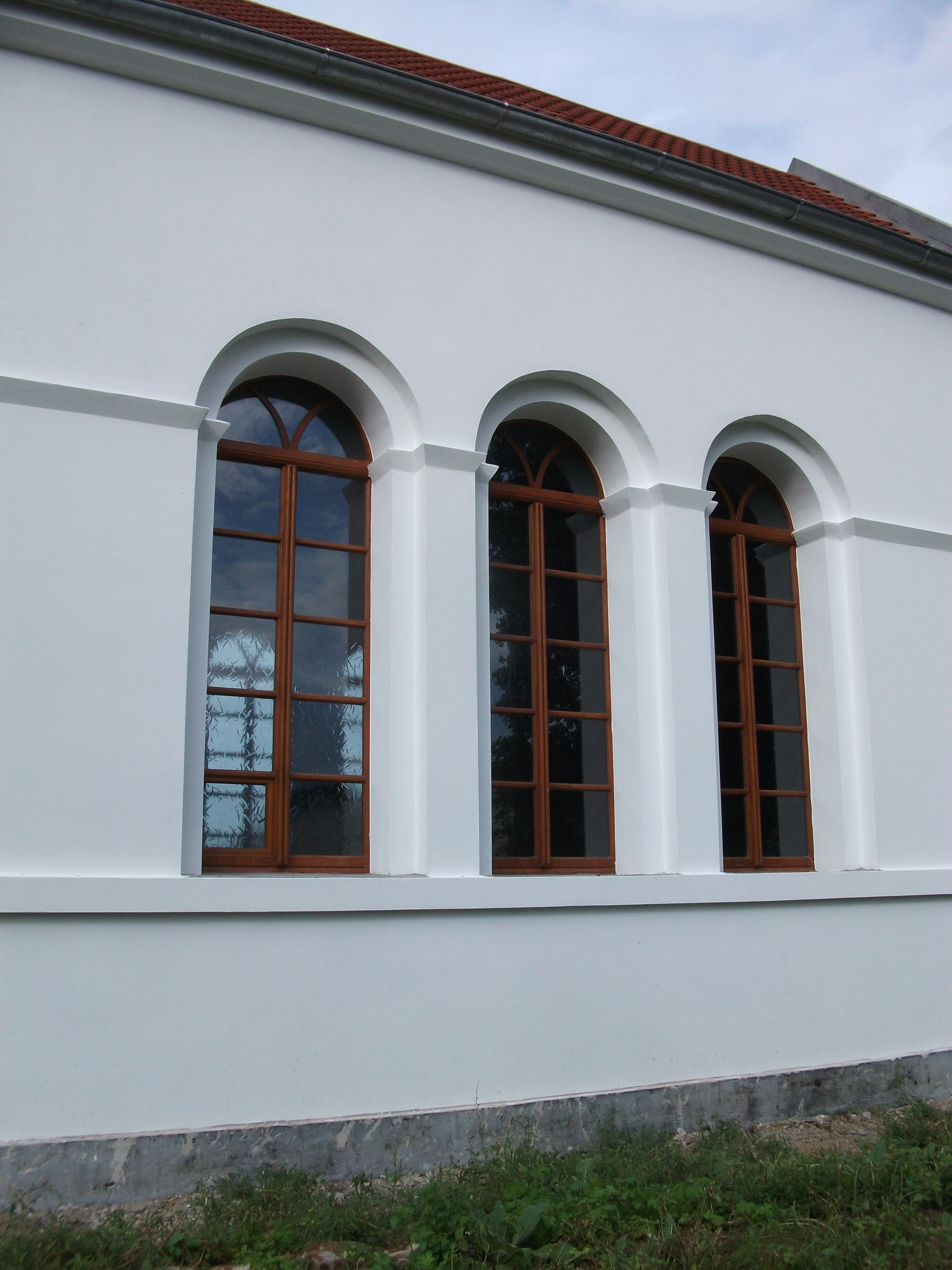

- Location within Poland
- Coordinates: 53°25′22″N 14°22′33″E
- Country: Poland
- Voivodeship: West Pomeranian
- County: Police
- Gmina: Dobra

Kościno [kɔɕˈt͡ɕinɔ] (German Köstin) is a village in the administrative district of Gmina Dobra, within Police County, West Pomeranian Voivodeship, in north-western Poland, close to the German border. It lies approximately 8 km (5 mi) south of Dobra, 18 km (11 mi) south-west of Police, and 14 km (9 mi) west of the regional capital Szczecin.

For the history of the region, see History of Pomerania.
