= Dołuje =

Polish village

- Village
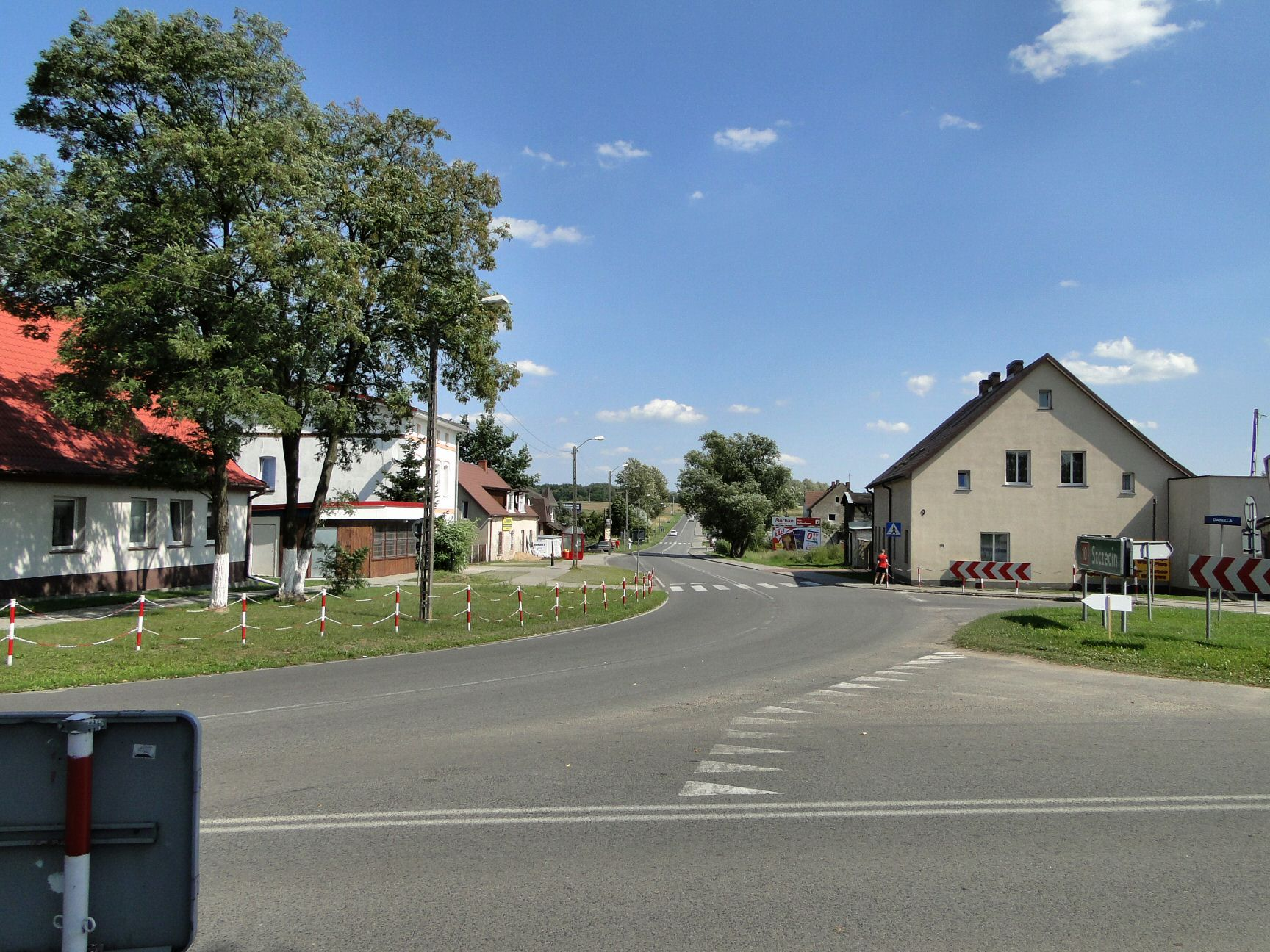

- Location within Poland
- Coordinates: 53°26′14″N 14°24′36″E
- Country: Poland
- Voivodeship: West Pomeranian
- County: Police
- Gmina: Dobra
- Population: 1,200

Dołuje [dɔˈwujɛ] (German: Neuenkirchen) is a village in the administrative district of Gmina Dobra, within Police County, West Pomeranian Voivodeship, in north-western Poland, close to the German border. It lies approximately 6 km (4 mi) south of Dobra, 15 km (9 mi) south-west of Police, and 12 km (7 mi) west of the regional capital Szczecin.

For the history of the region, see History of Pomerania.

The village has a population of 1,333 as of 2021.
