= Buk, Police County =

Buk
- Village
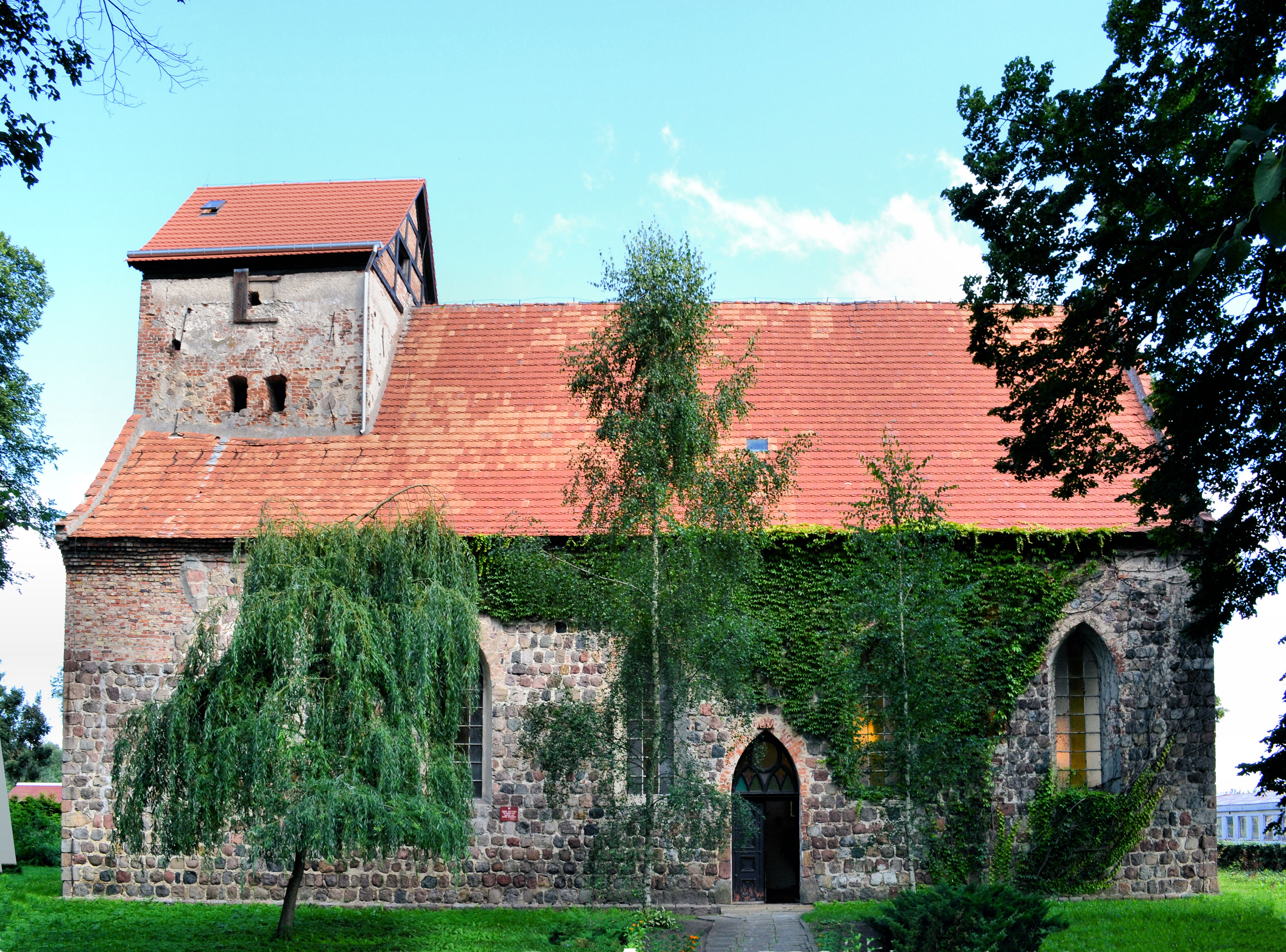
- Saint Anthony of Padua Church

- Location within Poland
- Coordinates: 53°29′59″N 14°21′15″E
- Country: Poland
- Voivodeship: West Pomeranian
- County: Police
- Gmina: Dobra
- Population: 250
- Time zone: UTC+1 (CET)
  - Summer (DST): UTC+2 (CEST)
- Postal code: 72-003
- Vehicle registration: ZPL

Buk [buk] (German: Böck) is a village in the administrative district of Gmina Dobra, within Police County, West Pomeranian Voivodeship, in north-western Poland, on the border with Germany. It lies approximately 3 km (2 mi) north-west of Dobra, 15 km (9 mi) west of Police, and 18 km (11 mi) north-west of the regional capital Szczecin.

The village has a population of 250.

A landmark in Buk is the medieval Gothic Saint Anthony of Padua church.

There is a memorial statue to the writer Elizabeth von Arnim in the village, which is close to Rzędziny, home to von Arnim from 1891 to 1908.
