= Mierzyn, Police County =

Mierzyn
- Village
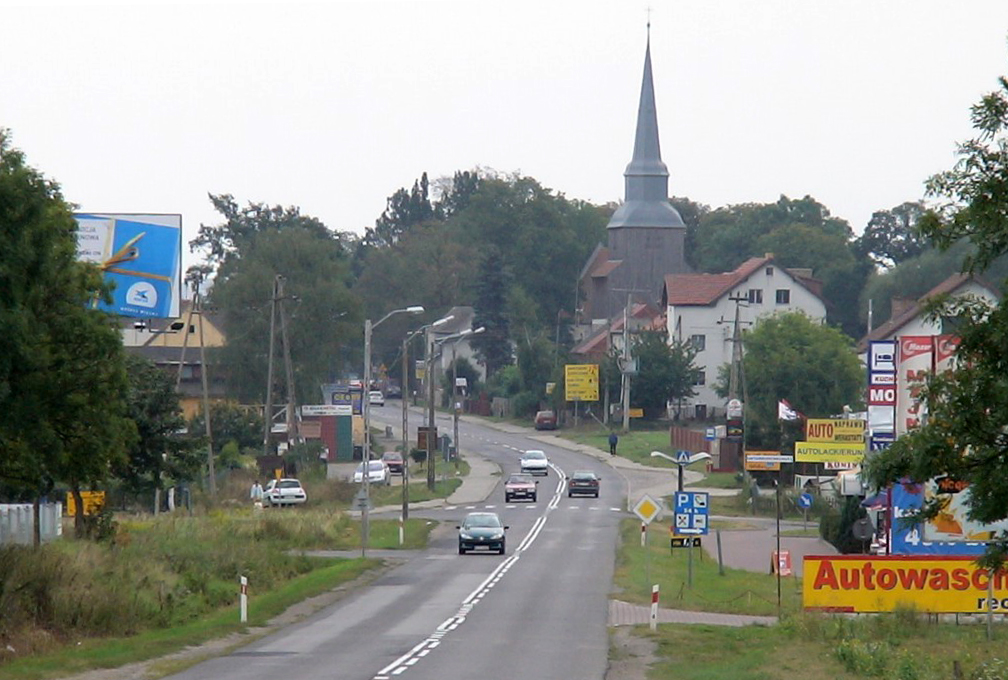

- Location within Poland
- Coordinates: 53°25′N 14°27′E
- Country: Poland
- Voivodeship: West Pomeranian
- County: Police
- Gmina: Dobra
- Population: 9,472 (2,019)
- Website: http://www.mierzyn.pl

Mierzyn [ˈmjɛʐɨn] (German: Möhringen) is a suburb of Szczecin, which is one of the most populous villages in Poland. It is located in the municipality of Gmina Dobra, within Police County, West Pomeranian Voivodeship, in north-western Poland, close to the German border. It lies approximately 9 km (6 mi) south-east of Dobra, 16 km (10 mi) south-west of Police, and 9 km (6 mi) west of the regional capital Szczecin.

For the history of the region, see History of Pomerania.
