= Łęgi, Police County =

Łęgi
- Village
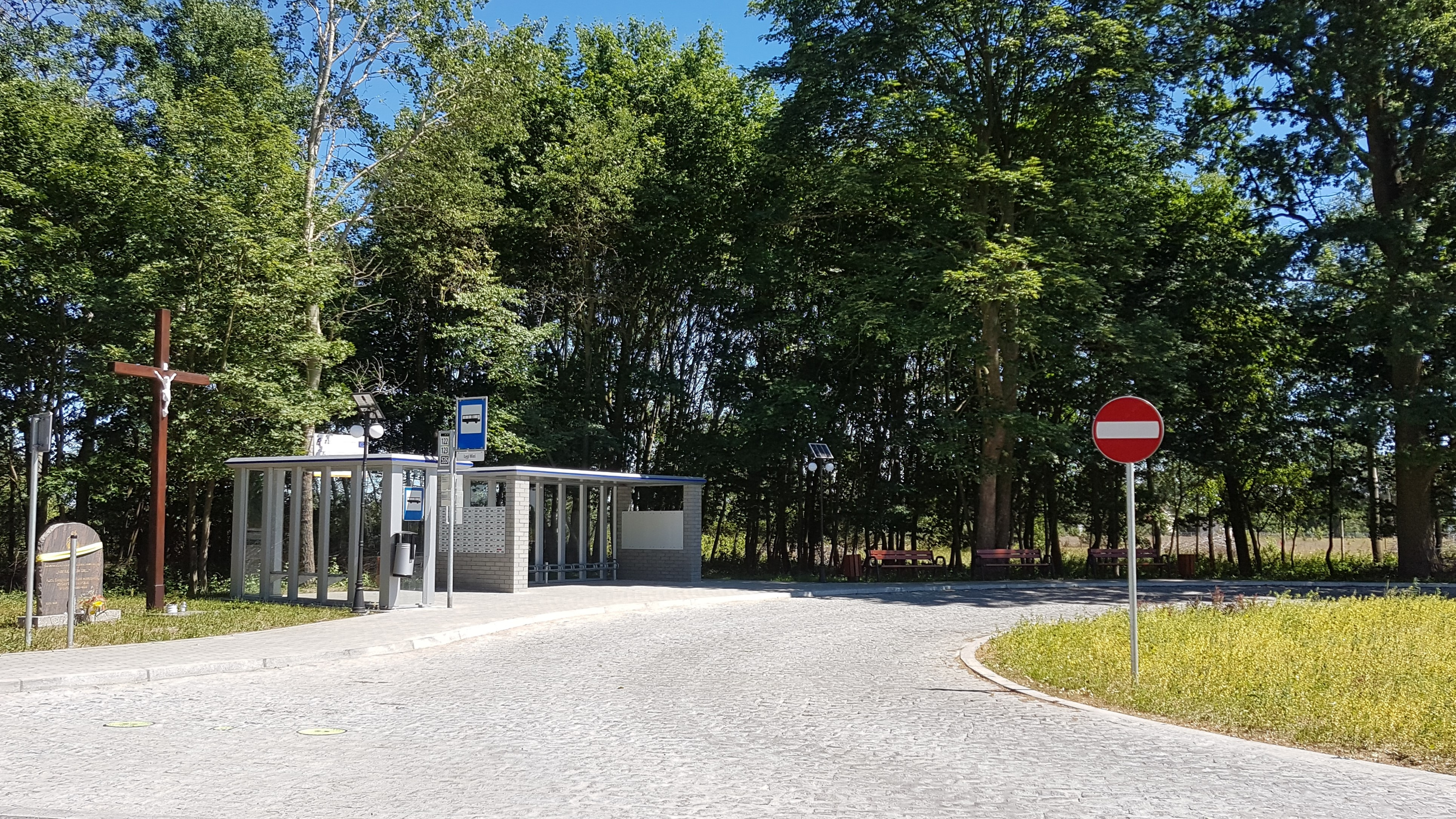

- Location within Poland
- Coordinates: 53°31′02″N 14°21′06″E
- Country: Poland
- Voivodeship: West Pomeranian
- County: Police
- Gmina: Dobra

Łęgi [ˈwɛnɡi] (German: Laack) is a village in the administrative district of Gmina Dobra, within Police County, West Pomeranian Voivodeship, in north-western Poland, close to the German border. It lies approximately 4 km (2 mi) north of Dobra, 14 km (9 mi) west of Police, and 19 km (12 mi) north-west of the regional capital Szczecin.
