= Grzepnica =

- Village
- Location within Poland
- Coordinates: 53°30′53″N 14°24′12″E
- Country: Poland
- Voivodeship: West Pomeranian
- County: Police
- Gmina: Dobra

Grzepnica [ɡʐɛpˈnit͡sa] (German Armenheide) is a village in the administrative district of Gmina Dobra, within Police County, West Pomeranian Voivodeship, in north-western Poland, close to the German border. It lies approximately 4 km (2 mi) north of Dobra, 12 km (7 mi) west of Police, and 17 km (11 mi) north-west of the regional capital Szczecin.

For the history of the region, see History of Pomerania.
