= Stolec, West Pomeranian Voivodeship =

Stolec
- Village
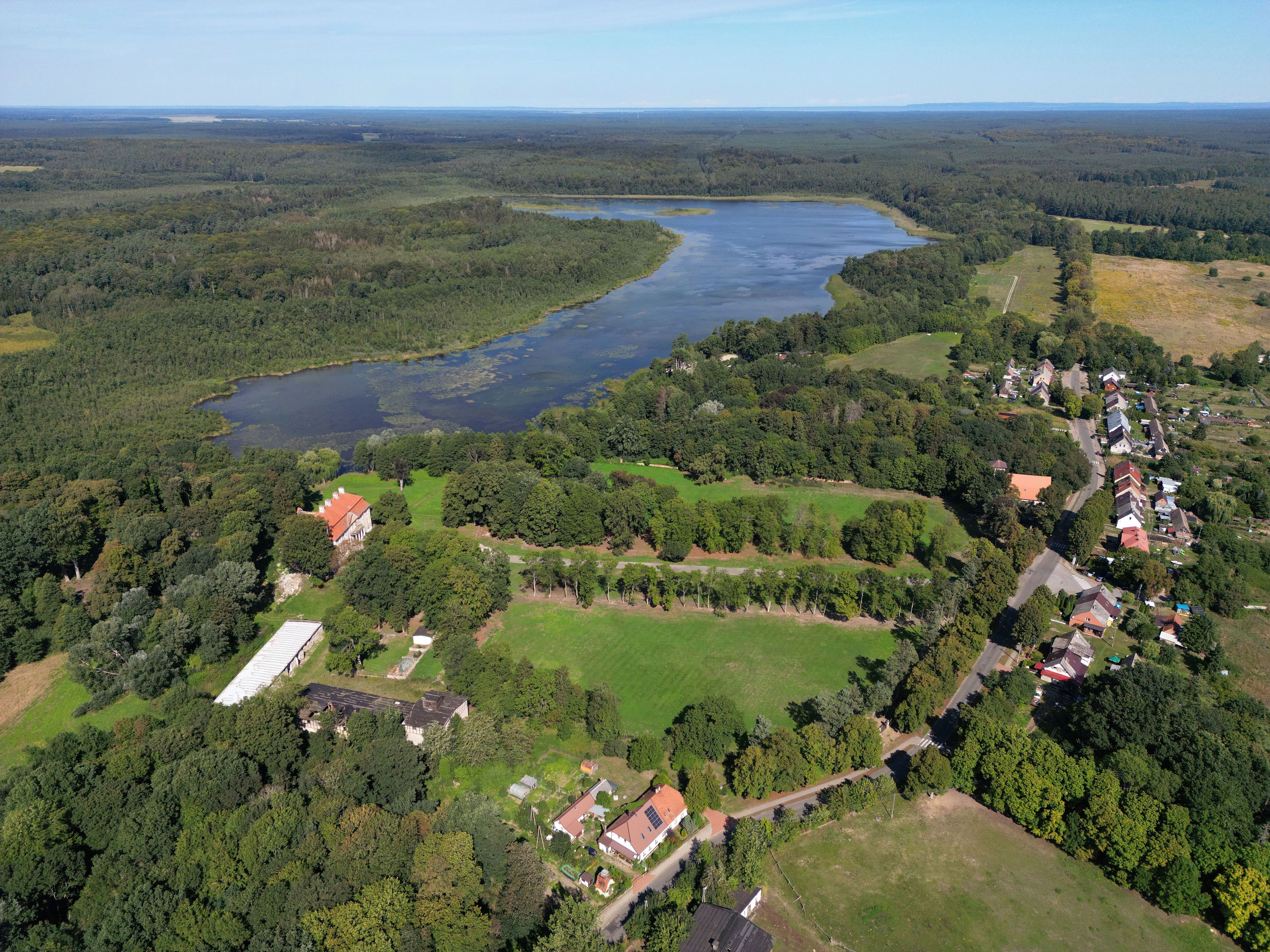
- Aerial view of Stolec

- Location within Poland
- Coordinates: 53°33′27″N 14°18′52″E
- Country: Poland
- Voivodeship: West Pomeranian
- County: Police
- Gmina: Dobra

Population (approx.)
  - Total: 210
- Time zone: UTC+1 (CET)
  - Summer (DST): UTC+2 (CEST)
- Vehicle registration: ZPL

Stolec ([ˈstɔlɛt͡s]; translation: throne, reigning chair; German: Stolzenburg) is a village in the administrative district of Gmina Dobra, within Police County, West Pomeranian Voivodeship, in north-western Poland, close to the German border. It lies approximately 10 km (6 mi) north-west of Dobra, 17 km (11 mi) west of Police, and 24 km (15 mi) north-west of the regional capital Szczecin.

The village has an approximate population of 210.
