= Redlica =

- Village
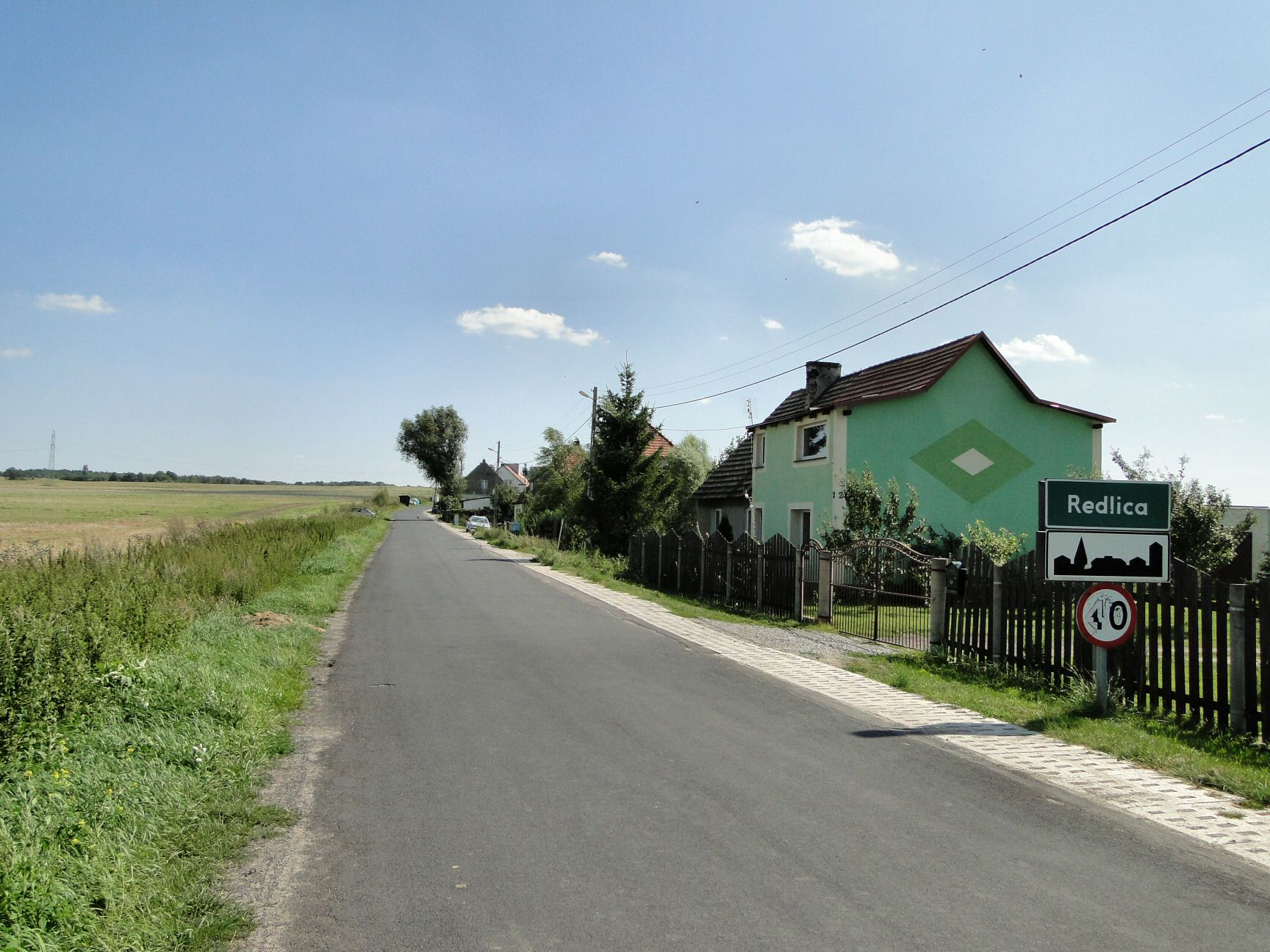

- Location within Poland
- Coordinates: 53°27′28″N 14°25′28″E
- Country: Poland
- Voivodeship: West Pomeranian
- County: Police
- Gmina: Dobra
- Population: 62

Redlica [rɛˈdlit͡sa] (German: Marienthal) is a village in the administrative district of Gmina Dobra, within Police County, West Pomeranian Voivodeship, in north-western Poland, close to the German border. It lies approximately 5 km (3 mi) south-east of Dobra, 13 km (8 mi) south-west of Police, and 12 km (7 mi) north-west of the regional capital Szczecin.

The village has a population of 62.
