= Rzędziny =

- Village
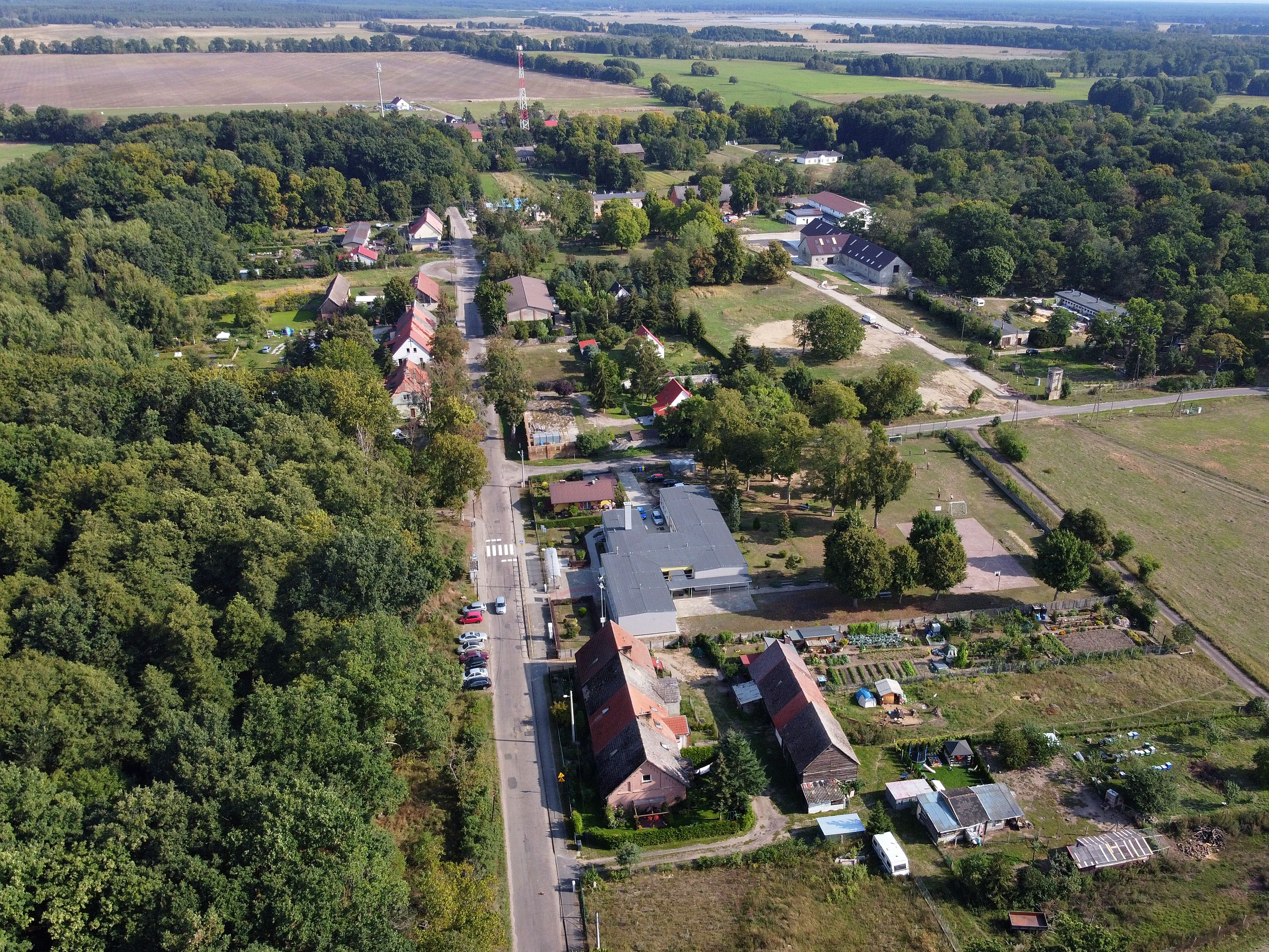
- Rzędziny (view from the south)

- Location within Poland
- Coordinates: 53°31′56″N 14°20′8″E
- Country: Poland
- Voivodeship: West Pomeranian
- County: Police
- Gmina: Dobra

Rzędziny [ʐɛnˈd͡ʑinɨ] (German: Nassenheide) is a village in the administrative district of Gmina Dobra, within Police County, West Pomeranian Voivodeship, in north-western Poland, close to the German border. It lies approximately 6 km (4 mi) north-west of Dobra, 16 km (10 mi) west of Police, and 21 km (13 mi) north-west of the regional capital Szczecin.

== History ==
From the 1890s until 1908, the village, then part of the German Empire and known as Nassenheide, was the home of Elizabeth von Arnim, an author born in Sydney, Australia and brought up in England; her experiences were encapsulated in her first semi-autobiographical novel Elizabeth and Her German Garden (1898). In spring and summer 1905, the English writer E.M. Forster lived at the von Arnim family estate, working as a tutor to the von Arnim children. Forster wrote a short memoir of the months he spent there. From April to July 1907, the writer Hugh Walpole was the children's tutor.

There is a memorial statue to Elizabeth von Arnim in the nearby village of Buk.
