= Płochocin, West Pomeranian Voivodeship =

Płochocin
- Settlement
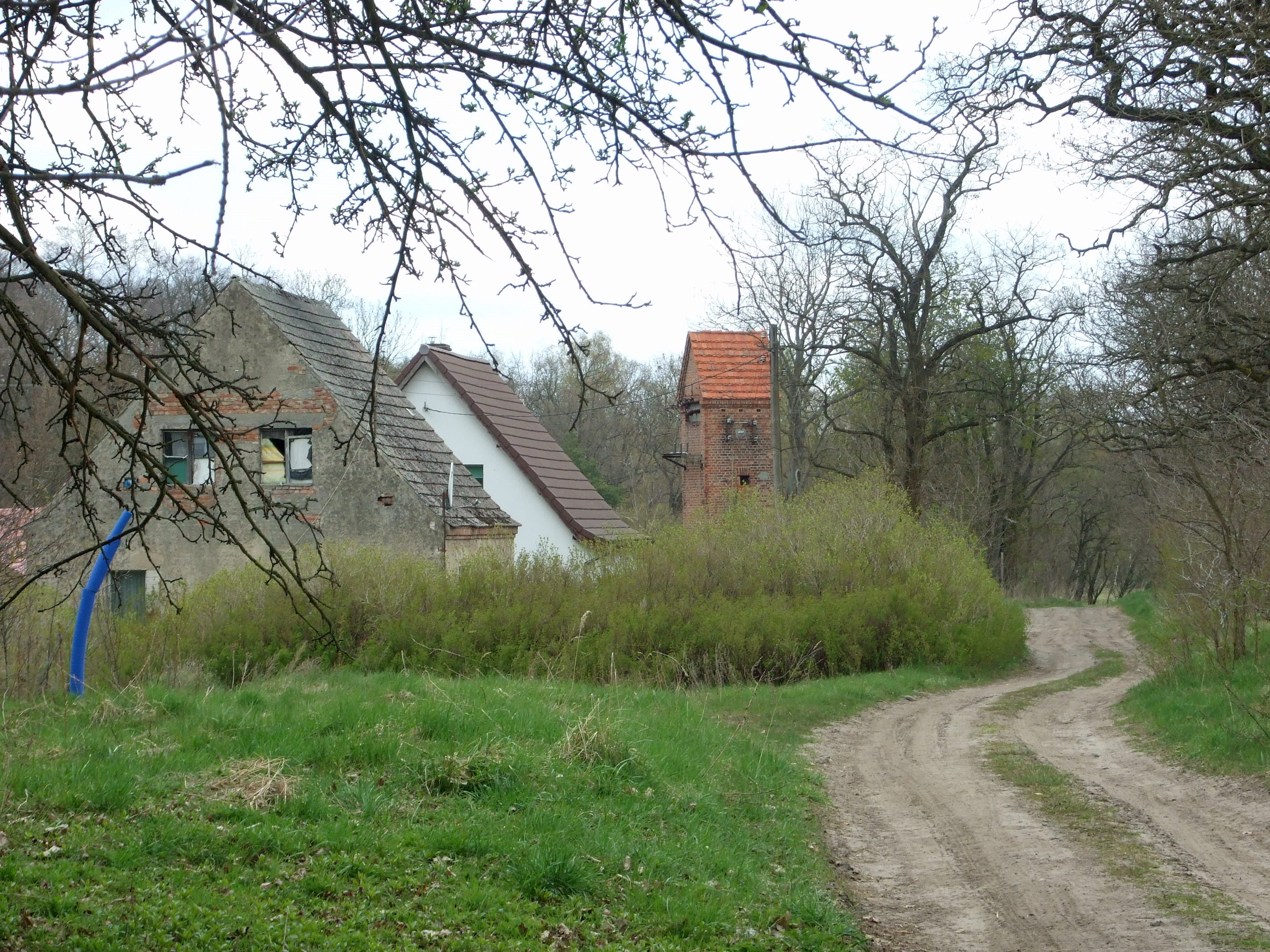

- Location within Poland
- Coordinates: 53°30′N 14°24′E
- Country: Poland
- Voivodeship: West Pomeranian
- County: Police
- Gmina: Dobra

Płochocin [pwɔˈxɔt͡ɕin] (German: Luisenhof) is a settlement in the administrative district of Gmina Dobra, within Police County, West Pomeranian Voivodeship, in north-western Poland, close to the German border. It lies approximately 2 km (1 mi) north-east of Dobra, 12 km (7 mi) west of Police, and 16 km (10 mi) north-west of the regional capital Szczecin.

For the history of the region, see History of Pomerania.
