= Skarbimierzyce =

- Village
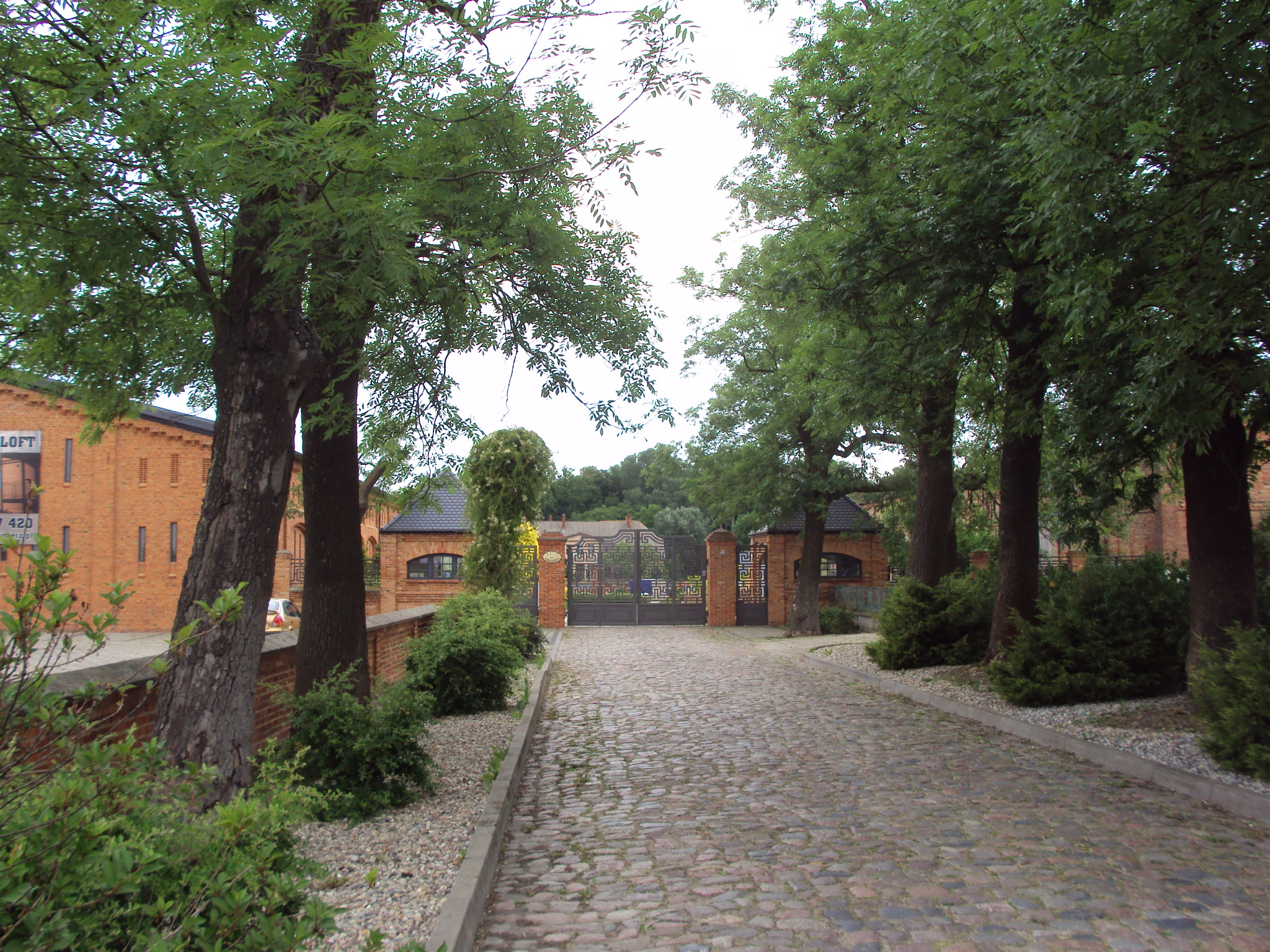

- Location within Poland
- Coordinates: 53°26′6″N 14°25′37″E
- Country: Poland
- Voivodeship: West Pomeranian
- County: Police
- Gmina: Dobra

Skarbimierzyce [skarbimjɛˈʐɨt͡sɛ] (German: Sparrenfelde) is a village in the administrative district of Gmina Dobra, within Police County, West Pomeranian Voivodeship, in north-western Poland, close to the German border. It lies approximately 7 km (4 mi) south-east of Dobra, 15 km (9 mi) south-west of Police, and 11 km (7 mi) west of the regional capital Szczecin.
