= Christine (Elizabeth von Arnim novel) =

1917 novel by Elizabeth von Arnim

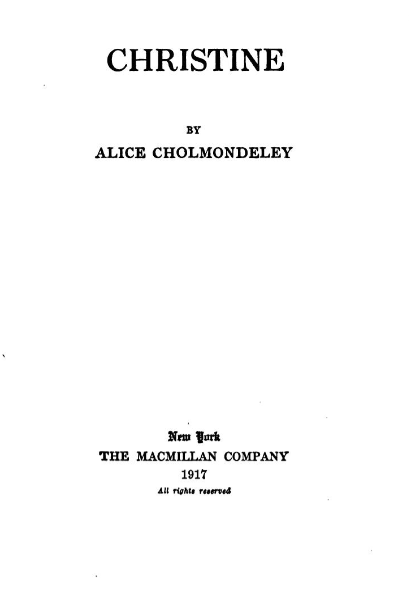
- U.S. title page for Christine (1917)
- Author: Elizabeth von Arnim
- Language: English
- Published: 1917
- Publication place: London and New York

Christine is an epistolary novel published by Elizabeth von Arnim in 1917 in the guise of "Alice Cholmondeley". It is the only novel Arnim wrote under that name. Initially marketed as non-fiction, it is made up of letters supposedly written by Christine Cholmondeley, an English girl studying in Germany, to her mother Alice. It covers the period from May to August 1914 and depicts the mood in Germany leading up to World War I. As war looms, Christine attempts to rejoin her mother, fleeing towards neutral Switzerland, but dies of pneumonia in Stuttgart before they can be reunited.

== The novel as propaganda ==
Arnim's first marriage to a German aristocrat (the "Man of Wrath") quickly turned sour and she never felt entirely at home in Germany. Nevertheless she did eventually master the language and appears to have felt no particular antipathy towards the nation: her early books feature only "sporadic and good-humoured teasing at the expense of German nationals", and she "treated Germans no less than English according to their individual merits". With better knowledge and a more nuanced understanding than most of her compatriots, she responded to the outpouring of anti-German feeling in the early stages of World War I "with many reservations".

Christine, which paints a consistently unsympathetic picture of the Germans, is therefore something of a departure. It was quickly co-opted as anti-German propaganda in the service of Britain's war effort. Isobel Maddison argues that Christine should be seen in the "context" of the literary activities sponsored by the British government's wartime propaganda bureau based at Wellington House in London, without producing any evidence that Arnim was linked to this operation, or even knew of its existence. Only sixteen women authors collaborated with the bureau (among hundreds of men), and there is no suggestion that Arnim was one of them.

Arnim's first biographer Leslie De Charms believes that her reasons for writing the novel were personal, and that her anger towards the Germans was prompted specifically by the death of her youngest daughter Felicitas near Bremen in 1916. Arnim got word of her daughter's death the same day she learned that her nephew John Beauchamp Waterlow had been killed in the Battle of Jutland. While Felicitas had died of pneumonia (like Christine), Arnim felt that her death was "just as directly the result of the war as Johnnie's", her daughter having been trapped in Germany by wartime travel and financial restrictions. She reiterates this point in the preface that begins the novel, written in the character of Alice: "The war killed Christine, just as surely as if she had been a soldier in the trenches."

== The novel as an authentic collection of letters ==
In any case, sophisticated reviewers were not deceived by the pretence that the letters were real, pointing to implausibilities such as:

- the fluency and general quality of the writing
- the inclusion of autobiographical backstory and other exposition that should not have been necessary in a young woman's letters to her own mother
- the panoptic view of German society and a familiarity with the country's elites that a foreign student from a modest background would have been unlikely to possess
- the "artistic unity" of the text: "From start to finish the book tells a definite story, with all the familiar earmarks of a carefully thought out plot, characters, and dramatic incident. Moreover, in the very first letters one scents a knowledge on the part of the author of what is coming ...".

Some reviewers hedged their bets by speculating that the novel may have been adapted from real letters. Others took it for granted that the whole thing was fiction, focusing instead on the ethics of the imposture, and concluding that it did not reflect well on "Alice Cholmondeley" or her publisher. The Nation of 23 August 1917 said that such a deception would be in "wretched taste".

Guessing the true identity of the book's author became something of a parlour game in the autumn of 1917, with the publisher Macmillan writing to The New York Times in October that Elizabeth von Arnim was "the one that seems to have gained the most popularity" (before proceeding to disparage the idea). Reviewers made the case for her authorship everywhere from The Athenaeum (London) to The Public Ledger (Philadelphia). The Sunday Times, in faraway Sydney, professed itself to be uninterested in the question of authorship before slyly recommending Christine to anyone who enjoyed (Arnim's) Elizabeth and Her German Garden or Fräulein Schmidt and Mr Anstruther.

Macmillan and Arnim conceded nothing. The publisher insisted that the manuscript had been submitted through an intermediary, and that "Alice Cholmondeley" was "entirely unknown" to them beyond her being "a new author". Arnim was determined to maintain the cover provided by her single-use pseudonym, and continued her "fierce repudiation of authorship, even among intimate friends". Arnim's third daughter, Beatrix, also lived in Germany, and both of Arnim's biographers agree that her most pressing concern was to shield her child from reprisals.
