= Wołczkowo =

- Village
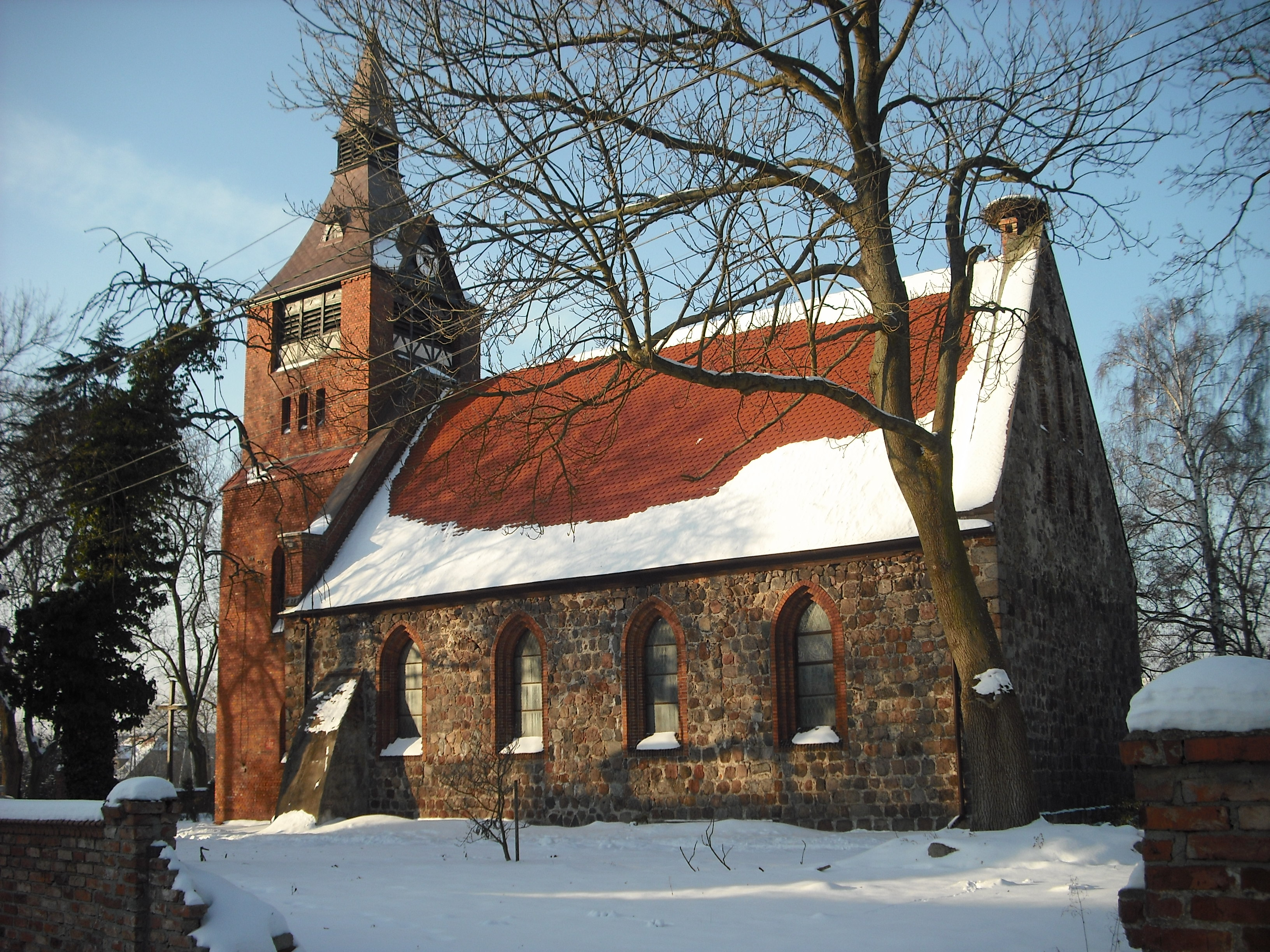

- Location within Poland
- Coordinates: 53°28′32″N 14°26′36″E
- Country: Poland
- Voivodeship: West Pomeranian
- County: Police
- Gmina: Dobra

Wołczkowo [vɔu̯t͡ʂˈkɔvɔ] (German: Völschendorf) is a village in the administrative district of Gmina Dobra, within Police County, West Pomeranian Voivodeship, in north-western Poland, close to the German border. It lies approximately 5 km (3 mi) east of Dobra, 11 km (7 mi) south-west of Police, and 12 km (7 mi) north-west of the regional capital Szczecin.
