= Sławoszewo, West Pomeranian Voivodeship =

Sławoszewo
- Settlement
- Location within Poland
- Coordinates: 53°31′13″N 14°26′15″E
- Country: Poland
- Voivodeship: West Pomeranian
- County: Police
- Gmina: Dobra

Sławoszewo [swavɔˈʂɛvɔ] (German: Neuhaus) is a settlement in the administrative district of Gmina Dobra, within Police County, West Pomeranian Voivodeship, in north-western Poland, close to the German border.
