= Elizabeth von Arnim =

Australian-born English writer (1866–1941)

Elizabeth von Arnim Countess Russell
- Elizabeth von Arnim in 1900
- Born: Mary Annette Beauchamp; 31 August 1866; Kirribilli Point, Australia
- Died: 9 February 1941 (aged 74); Charleston, South Carolina, United States
- Resting place: Tylers Green, Bucks, England
- Occupation: Writer
- Spouses: Henning August von Arnim-Schlagenthin (m. 1891; died 1910) Frank Russell, 2nd Earl Russell (m. 1916; died 1931)
- Children: 5
- Relatives: Katherine Mansfield (cousin)
- Writing career
- Pen name: Elizabeth
- Period: 1898–1936

Elizabeth von Arnim (31 August 1866 – 9 February 1941), born Mary Annette Beauchamp, was an English novelist. Born in Australia, she married a German aristocrat, and her earliest works are set in Germany. Her first marriage made her Countess von Arnim-Schlagenthin and her second Elizabeth Russell, Countess Russell. After her first husband's death, she had a three-year affair with the writer H. G. Wells, then later married Frank Russell, elder brother of the Nobel Prize-winner and philosopher Bertrand Russell. She was a cousin of the New Zealand-born writer Katherine Mansfield. Though known in early life as May, her first book introduced her to readers as Elizabeth, which she eventually became to friends and finally to family.

Arnim published anonymously, or simply as "Elizabeth", or on one occasion as "Alice Cholmondeley", and her work has been catalogued under various combinations of her given names, surnames and titles. Modern bibliography attributes her work to Elizabeth von Arnim, her preferred name when her literary career began.

== Early life ==
She was born at her family's home on Kirribilli Point in Sydney, Australia, to Henry Herron Beauchamp (1825–1907), a wealthy shipping merchant, and Elizabeth (nicknamed Louey) Weiss Lassetter (1836–1919). She was called May by her family. She had four brothers and a sister. One of her cousins was the New Zealand-born Kathleen Beauchamp, who wrote under the pen name Katherine Mansfield. When she was three years old, the family moved to England, where they lived in London but also spent several years in Switzerland.

Arnim was the first cousin of Mansfield's father, Harold Beauchamp, making her the first cousin once removed of Mansfield. Although Elizabeth was older by 22 years, she and Mansfield later corresponded, reviewed each other's works, and became close friends. Mansfield, ill with tuberculosis, lived in the Montana region of Switzerland (now Crans-Montana) from May 1921 until January 1922, renting the Chalet des Sapins with her husband John Middleton Murry from June 1921. The house was only a "1/2 an hour's scramble away" from Arnim's Chalet Soleil at Randogne. Arnim visited her cousin often during this period. They got on well, although Mansfield considered the much wealthier Arnim to be patronizing. Mansfield satirized Arnim as the character Rosemary in a short story, "A Cup of Tea", which she wrote while in Switzerland.

Arnim studied at the Royal College of Music, principally learning the organ.

== Personal life ==
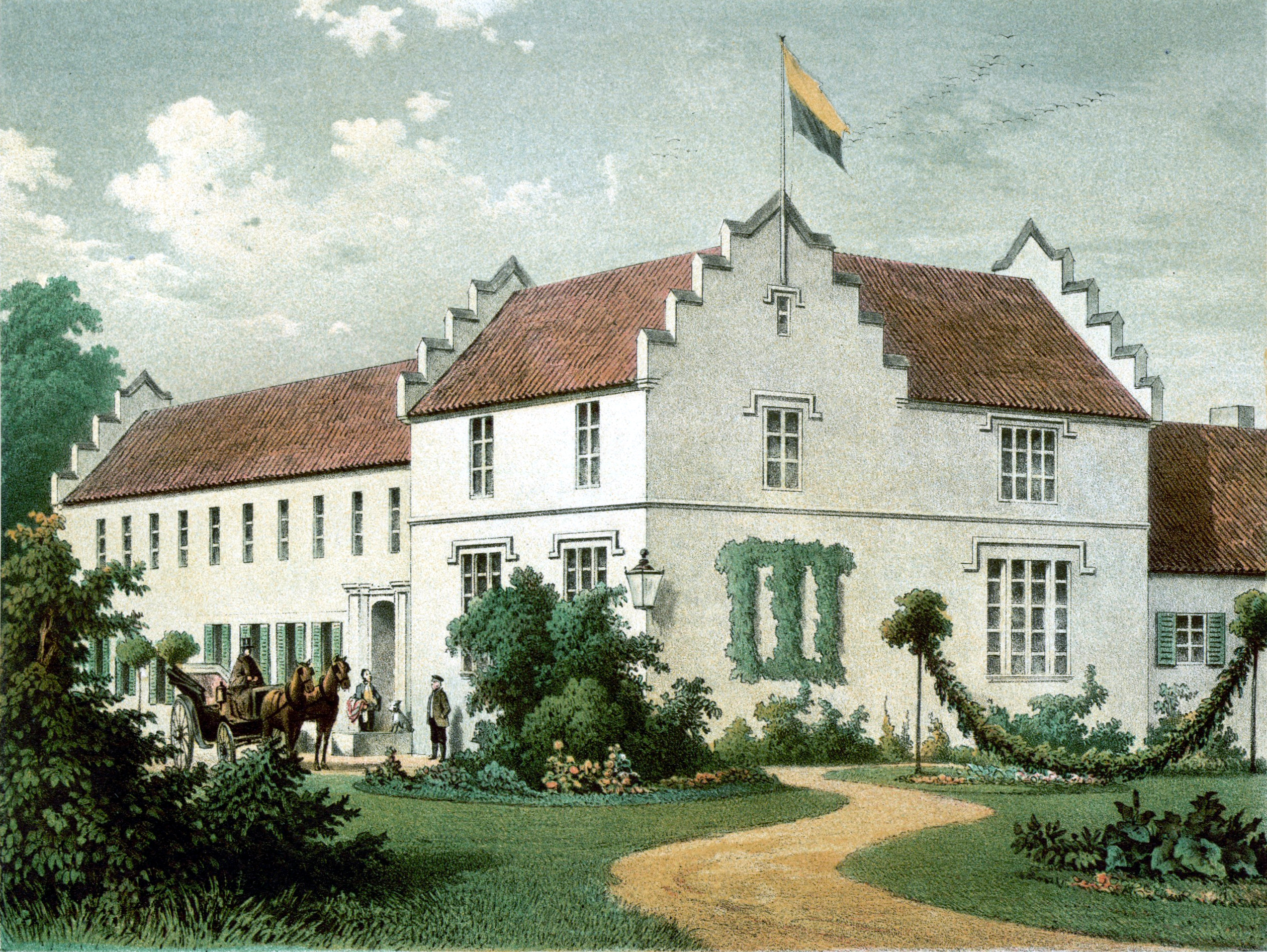
The von Arnim-Schlagenthin family manor in Nassenheide, Pomerania, (now Rzędziny), c. 1860

On 21 February 1891, Elizabeth married the widowed German aristocrat Count Henning August von Arnim-Schlagenthin (1851–1910) in London, whom she had met on a tour of Italy with her father two years earlier. He was the eldest son of the late Count Harry von Arnim, the former German Ambassador to France. At first they lived in Berlin, then in 1896 moved to what was then Nassenheide, Pomerania (now Rzędziny in Poland), where the Arnim family had a landed estate. They had four daughters and a son, born between December 1891 and October 1901. In 1899, Henning von Arnim was arrested and imprisoned for fraud but was later acquitted.

At the time of the 1901 United Kingdom census, on 1 April 1901, Arnim was in England, staying with her uncle Henry Beauchamp at The Retreat, Bexley, without any of her children. Her son Henning Bernd was born in London in October 1902.

The children's tutors at Nassenheide included E. M. Forster, who worked there for several months in the spring and summer of 1905. Forster wrote a short memoir of the months he spent there. From April to July 1907 the writer Hugh Walpole was the children's tutor.

In 1908, Elizabeth von Arnim moved to London with the children. The couple did not consider this a formal separation, although the marriage had been unhappy, owing to the Count's affairs, and they had slept in separate bedrooms for some time. In 1910, financial problems meant the Nassenheide estate had to be sold. Later that year, Count von Arnim died in Bad Kissingen, with his wife and three of their daughters by his side. In 1911, Elizabeth moved to Randogne, Switzerland, where she had the Chalet Soleil built, and entertained literary and society friends. From 1910 until 1913, she was a mistress of the novelist H. G. Wells.

In 1916, the Arnims' daughter Felicitas, who had been at boarding schools in Switzerland and Germany, died of pneumonia aged sixteen in Bremen. She had been unable to return to England because of travel and financial controls caused by the First World War.

=== Second marriage and separation, house moves, and death ===
In January 1916, Arnim married Frank Russell, 2nd Earl Russell, the elder brother of the philosopher Bertrand Russell. The marriage ended in acrimony, with the couple separating in 1919, although they never divorced. She then went to the United States, where her daughters Liebet and Evi were living. In 1920 she returned to her home in Switzerland, using it as a base for frequent trips to other parts of Europe. In the same year, she embarked on an affair with Alexander Stuart Frere (1892–1984), who later became chairman of the publishing house Heinemann. Frere, 26 years her junior, initially went to stay at the Chalet Soleil to catalogue her large library, and a romance ensued. The affair lasted several years. In 1933, Frere married the writer and theater critic Patricia Wallace, and Arnim was the godmother of the couple's only daughter Elizabeth (later Elizabeth Frere Jones) who was named in her honour.

In 1930, Arnim set up a home in Mougins in the south of France, seeking a warmer climate. She created a rose garden there and called the house Mas des Roses. She continued to entertain her social and literary circle there, as she had done in Switzerland. She kept this house to the end of her life, although she moved to the United States in 1939 at the beginning of the Second World War. She died of influenza at the Riverside Infirmary, Charleston, South Carolina, on 9 February 1941, aged 74, and was cremated at Fort Lincoln Cemetery, Maryland. In 1947 her ashes were mingled with those of her brother, Sir Sydney Beauchamp, in the churchyard of St Margaret's, Tylers Green, Penn, Buckinghamshire. The Latin inscription on her tombstone reads parva sed apta (small but apt), alluding to her short stature.

== Literary career ==
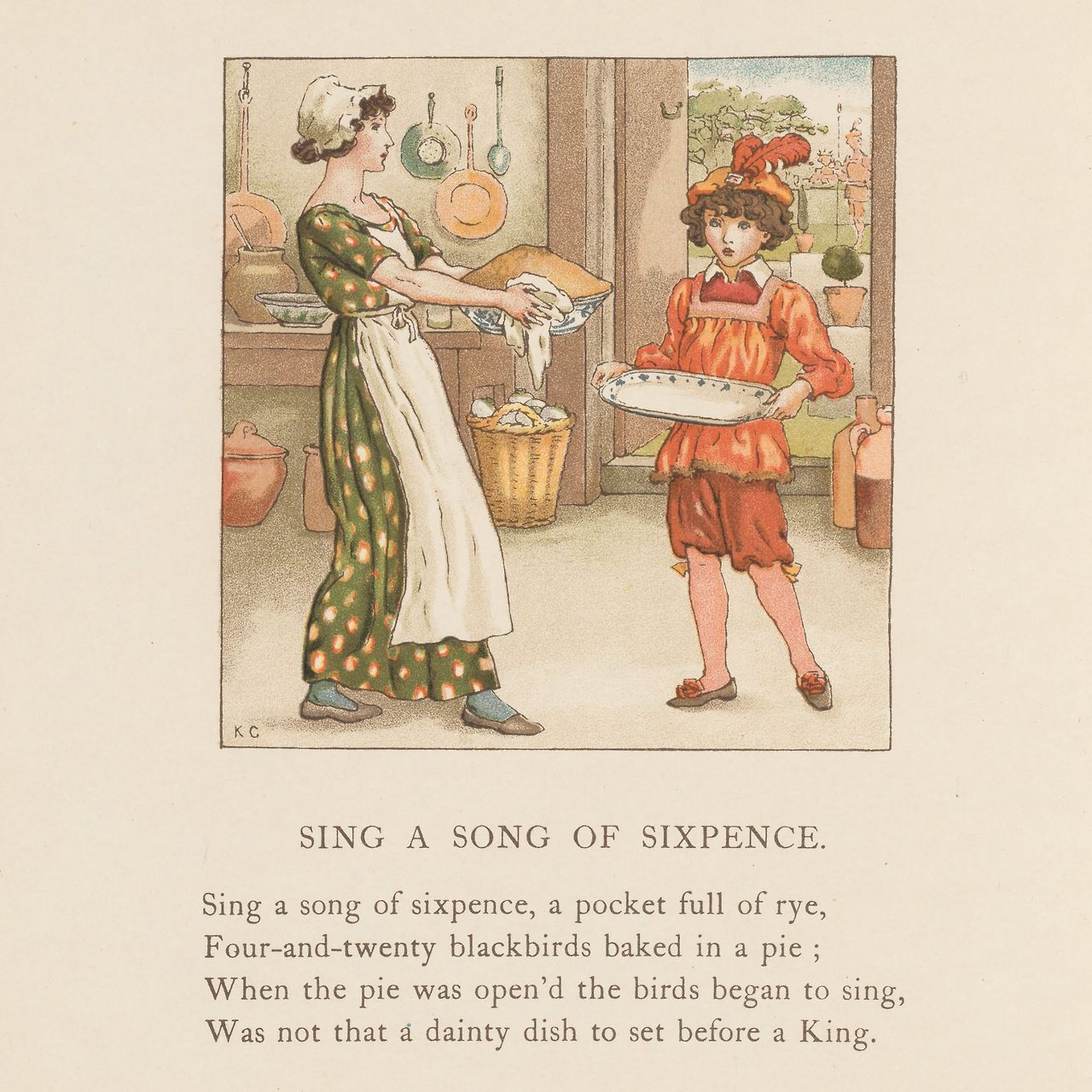
Illustration by Kate Greenaway for April Baby's Book of Tunes, 1900

Arnim launched her career as a writer with her satirical and semi-autobiographical Elizabeth and Her German Garden (1898). Published anonymously, it chronicled the protagonist Elizabeth's struggles to create a garden on the family estate and her attempts to integrate into German aristocratic Junker society. In it, she fictionalized her husband as "The Man of Wrath". It was reprinted twenty times by May 1899, a year after its publication. A bitter-sweet memoir and companion to it was The Solitary Summer (1899).

By 1900, Arnim's books had such success that the identity of "Elizabeth" caused newspaper speculation in London, New York and elsewhere.

Other works, such as The Benefactress (1902), The Adventures of Elizabeth on Rügen (1904), Vera (1921), and Love (1925), were also semi-autobiographical. Some titles ensued that deal with protest against domineering Junkertum and witty observations of life in provincial Germany, including The Princess Priscilla's Fortnight (1905) and Fräulein Schmidt and Mr Anstruther (1907). She would sign her twenty or so books, after the first, initially as "by the author of Elizabeth and Her German Garden" and later simply as "By Elizabeth".

In 1909, The Princess Priscilla's Fortnight was turned into a play called The Cottage in the Air, and in 1929 into the film The Runaway Princess, directed by Anthony Asquith and starring Mady Christians.

Although Arnim never wrote a conventional autobiography, All the Dogs of My Life (1936), an account of her love for her pets, contains many glimpses of her glittering social circle.

=== Reception ===
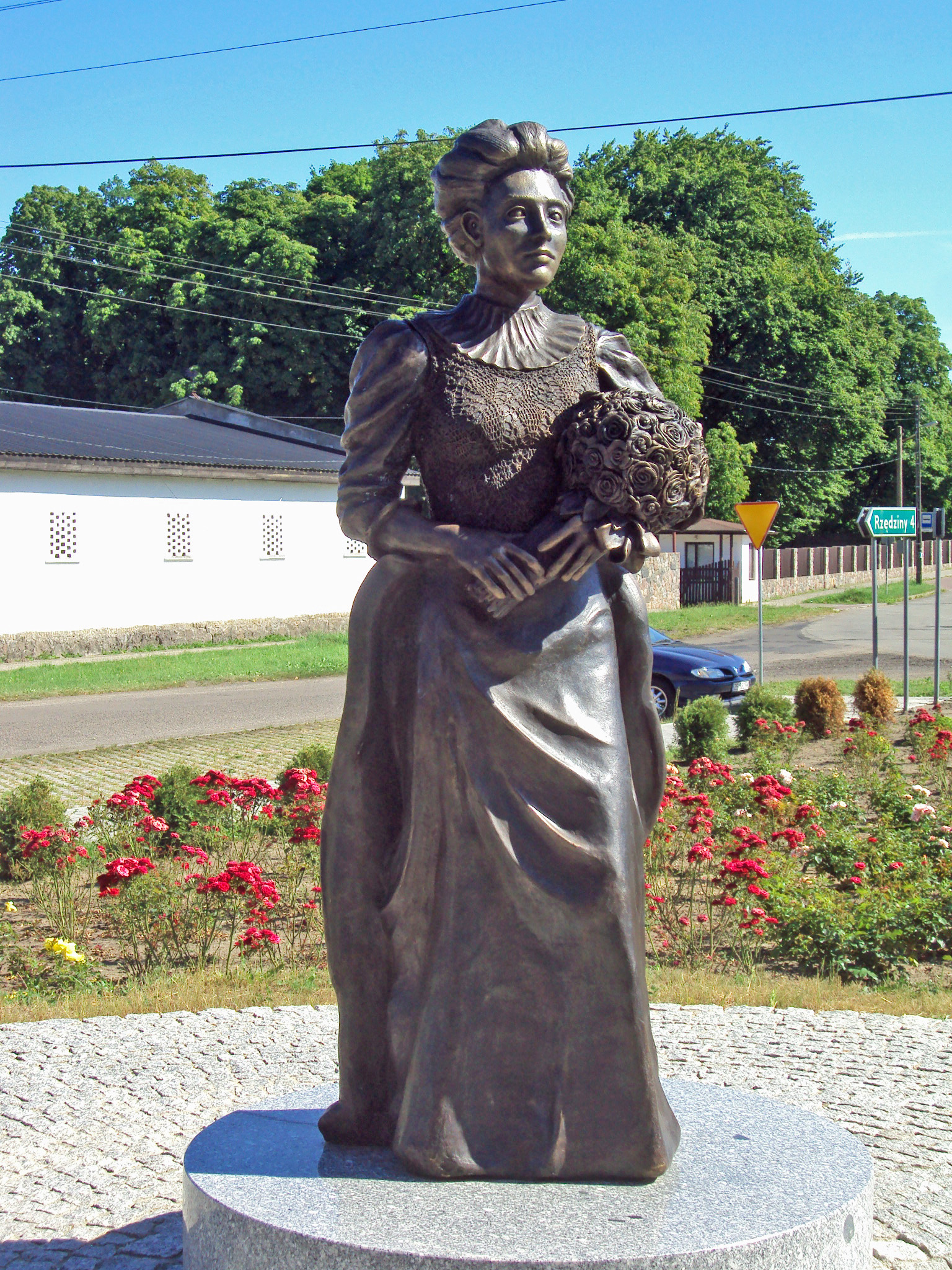
Elizabeth von Arnim Monument in Buk, Poland

Arnim's 1921 novel Vera, a dark tragi-comedy drawing on her disastrous marriage to Earl Russell, was her most critically acclaimed work, described by John Middleton Murry as "Wuthering Heights as if written by Jane Austen".

Her 1922 work, The Enchanted April, inspired by a month-long holiday to the Italian Riviera, is perhaps the lightest and most ebullient of her novels. It has regularly been adapted for the stage and screen: as a Broadway play in 1925, a 1935 American feature film, an Academy Award-nominated feature film in 1992 (starring Josie Lawrence, Jim Broadbent and Joan Plowright among others), a Tony Award-nominated stage play in 2003, a musical play in 2010, and in 2015 a serial on BBC Radio 4. Terence de Vere White credits The Enchanted April with making the Italian resort of Portofino fashionable. It is also, probably, the most widely read of all her works, having been a Book-of-the-Month club choice in America upon publication.

Her 1940 novel Mr. Skeffington was made into an Academy Award-nominated feature film by Warner Bros. in 1944, starring Bette Davis and Claude Rains, and a 60-minute "Lux Radio Theater" broadcast radio adaptation of the movie on 1 October 1945.

Since 1983, the British publisher Virago has been reprinting her work with new introductions by modern writers, some of which claim her as a feminist. The Reader's Encyclopedia reports that many of her later novels are "tired exercises", but this opinion is not widely held.

Perhaps the best example of Arnim's mordant wit and unusual attitude to life is provided in one of her letters: "I'm so glad I didn't die on the various occasions I have earnestly wished I might, for I would have missed a lot of lovely weather."

== Selected publications ==
Arnim's writings are in the public domain. Project Gutenberg has transcribed many of her works, with at least one additional title at Project Gutenberg Australia. Several of her books are also available at the Internet Archive.

- Elizabeth and Her German Garden (1898)
- The Solitary Summer (1899)
- The April Baby's Book of Tunes (1900) — illustrated by Kate Greenaway
- The Benefactress (1901)
- The Ordeal of Elizabeth (1901) — draft of a novel, published posthumously
- The Adventures of Elizabeth in Rügen (1904)
- Princess Priscilla's Fortnight (1905)
- Fräulein Schmidt and Mr Anstruther (1907)
- The Caravaners (1909)
- The Pastor's Wife (1914)
- Christine (1917) — written under the pseudonym Alice Cholmondeley
- Christopher and Columbus (1919)
- In the Mountains (1920)
- Vera (1921)
- The Enchanted April (1922)
- Love (1925)
- Introduction to Sally (1926)
- Expiation (1929)
- Father (1931)
- The Jasmine Farm (1934)
- All the Dogs of My Life (1936) — autobiography
- Mr. Skeffington (1940)

== Notes ==
Sources

- Maddison, Isobel (Spring 2012). "A Second Flowering: Elizabeth and her German Garden" (PDF). London Library Magazine. No. 15. Archived from the original (PDF) on 19 July 2020 – via Katherine Mansfield Society.
- Maddison, Isobel (2013). "Worms of the same family: Elizabeth von Arnim and Katherine Mansfield". Elizabeth von Arnim: Beyond the German Garden. Farnham: Ashgate. ISBN 978-1-4094-1167-3.
- Morgan, Joyce (2021). The Countess from Kirribilli. Sydney: Allen & Unwin. ISBN 978-1-76087-517-6.
- Usborne, Karen (1986). "Elizabeth": The Author of Elizabeth and Her German Garden. London: Bodley Head. ISBN 978-0-370-30887-6.

== Other biographies ==
- Joyce Morgan, The Countess from Kirribilli. Sydney: Allen & Unwin, 2021 ISBN 9781760875176
- Carey, Gabrielle (2020). Only Happiness Here: In Search of Elizabeth von Arnim. St Lucia, Qld.: University of Queensland Press.
- Katie Roiphe, Uncommon Arrangements: Seven Portraits of Married Life in London Literary Circles 1910–1939. New York: Dial Press, 2008 ISBN 978-0-385-33937-7
- Jennifer Walker, Elizabeth of the German Garden – A Literary Journey. Brighton: Book Guild, 2013 ISBN 978-1-84624-851-1
