= Wąwelnica =

- Village
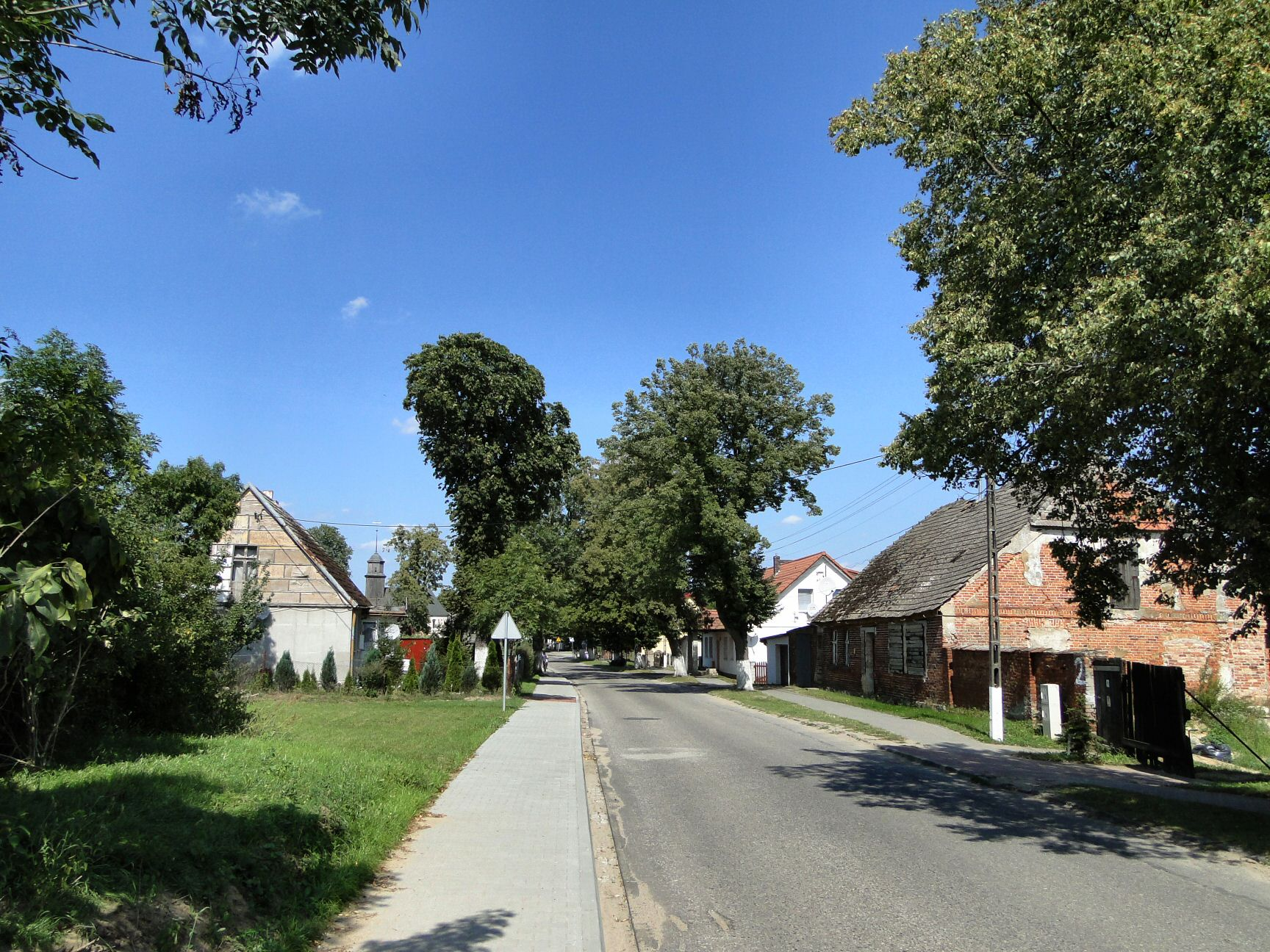

- Location within Poland
- Coordinates: 53°27′6″N 14°24′38″E
- Country: Poland
- Voivodeship: West Pomeranian
- County: Police
- Gmina: Dobra
- Time zone: UTC+1 (CET)
  - Summer (DST): UTC+2 (CEST)
- Vehicle registration: ZPL

Wąwelnica [vɔ̃vɛlˈnit͡sa] (German: Wamlitz) is a village in the administrative district of Gmina Dobra, within Police County, West Pomeranian Voivodeship, in north-western Poland, close to the German border. It lies approximately 5 km (3 mi) south-east of Dobra, 14 km (9 mi) south-west of Police, and 13 km (8 mi) west of the regional capital Szczecin.

The landmark of Wąwelnica is the medieval Gothic Our Lady of Częstochowa church.

In 2014, a hoard of 60 mostly bronze artifacts was discovered at an archaeological site in Wąwelnica, which eventually became part of the collection of the National Museum in Szczecin.
