= Vera (von Arnim novel) =

1921 novel by Elizabeth Von Arnim

- Author: Elizabeth von Arnim
- Language: English
- Publication date: 1921

Vera by Elizabeth von Arnim is a 1921 novel based on the author's experiences during her second marriage, to Frank Russell. It is an analysis of the naivety of a young woman, as she falls into the power of a pathologically narcissistic husband. In outline, the novel anticipates Daphne du Maurier's Rebecca. Naive Lucy Entwhistle is swept into marriage by a widower, Everard Wemyss. His mansion, "The Willows", is pervaded by the spectre of his dead wife Vera, who Lucy gradually comes to suspect committed suicide rather than endure being married to Wemyss. The story is a black vision of a young wife who gradually begins to understand that her husband will accept nothing less than total intellectual and emotional servitude. Many of von Arnim's other books, including the Enchanted April, are written with verve, humour and a delight in the romantic: Vera is closer to a nightmare.

When The Times Literary Supplement published a bad review of Vera, her friend John Middleton Murry consoled her by saying that it was to be expected that the reviewers would not know what to make of a novel that sounded like Wuthering Heights written by Jane Austen. Comparisons with Austen were also made by Sydney Waterlow, Hugh Walpole and Augustine Birrell.

Von Arnim herself considered Vera her "high water mark".
