= Gmina Dobra (Szczecińska) =

- Gmina
- Coat of arms
- Interactive map of Gmina Dobra (Szczecińska)
- Coordinates (Dobra): 53°29′13″N 14°23′3″E
- Country: Poland
- Voivodeship: West Pomeranian
- County: Police
- Seat: Dobra

Area
  - Total: 110.27 km^{2} (42.58 sq mi)

Population (2018)
  - Total: 23,472
  - Density: 212.86/km^{2} (551.30/sq mi)
- Website: https://www.dobraszczecinska.pl/

Gmina Dobra (Szczecińska) is a rural gmina (administrative district) in Police County, West Pomeranian Voivodeship, in north-western Poland, on the German border. Its seat is the village of Dobra, which lies approximately 14 kilometres (9 mi) south-west of Police and 16 km (10 mi) north-west of the regional capital Szczecin.

The gmina covers an area of 110.27 square kilometres (42.6 sq mi), and as of 2006 its total population is 12,361.

== Villages ==
Gmina Dobra contains the villages and settlements of Bezrzecze, Buk, Dobra, Dołuje, Grzepnica, Kościno, Łęgi, Mierzyn, Płochocin, Redlica, Rzędziny, Skarbimierzyce, Sławoszewo, Stolec, Wąwelnica and Wołczkowo.

== Neighbouring gminas ==
Gmina Dobra is bordered by the city of Szczecin and by the gminas of Kołbaskowo and Police. It also borders Germany.
