= Elizabeth and Her German Garden =

1898 novel by Elizabeth von Arnim

- Author: Elizabeth von Arnim
- Language: English
- Publisher: Macmillan and Co., Ltd
- Publication date: 1898
- LC Class: PZ3.R9158 E3

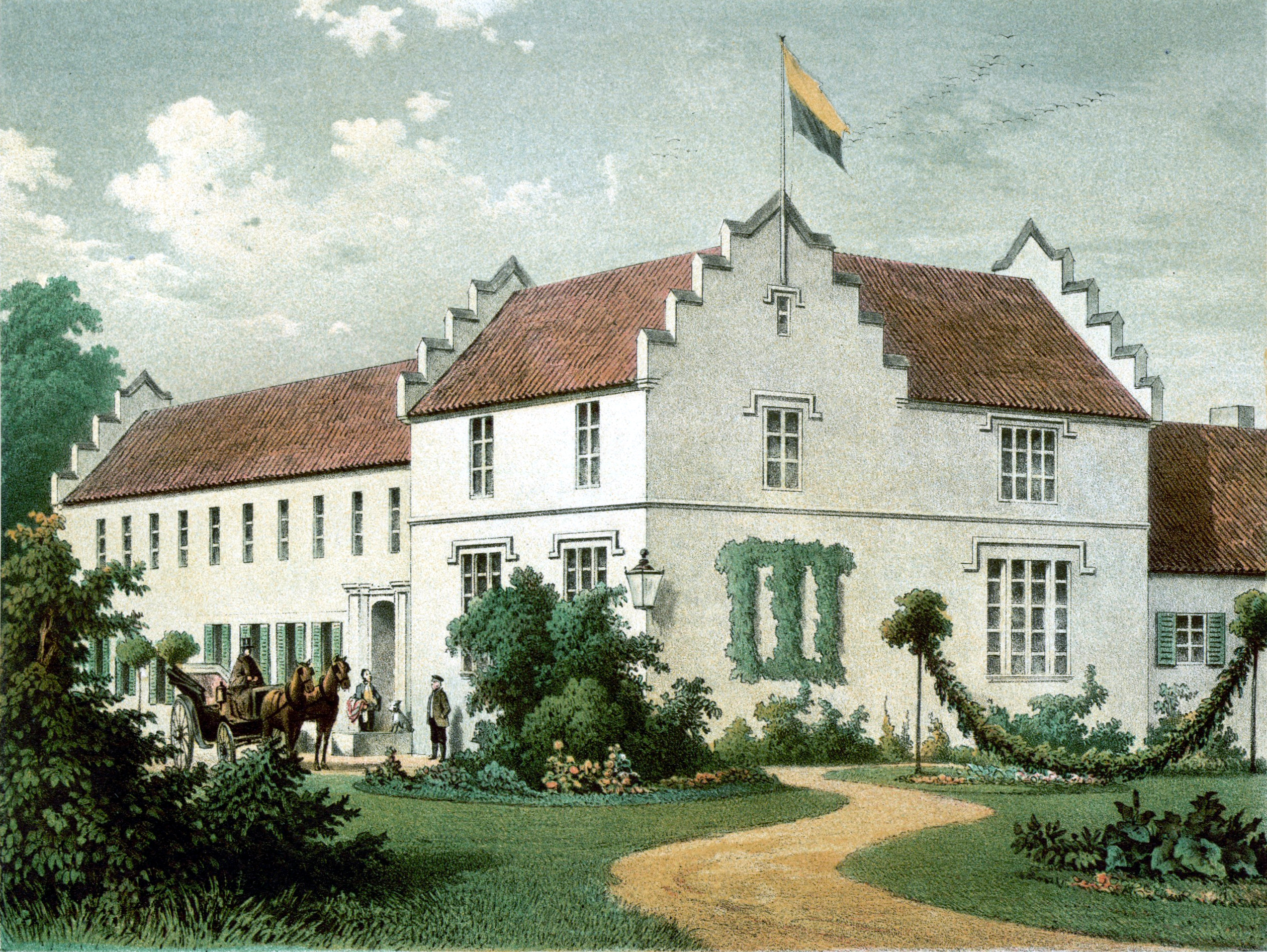
The Von Arnim family manor in Nassenheide, Pomerania, where the story is set, c.1860

Elizabeth and Her German Garden is a novel by the Australian-born writer Elizabeth von Arnim, first published in 1898. It was very popular and frequently reprinted during the early years of the 20th century.

The book earned over £10,000 in the first year of publication, with 11 reprints during 1898; by May 1899, it had been reprinted 21 times.

The book is the first in a series about the same character, "Elizabeth". It is noteworthy for originally being published without a named author. Von Arnim insisted that she must remain anonymous because she claimed her husband, the German aristocrat Count Henning August von Arnim-Schlagenthin, whom she satirises in the book, would have found it unacceptable for his wife to write commercial fiction.

Although the book is semi-autobiographical, the novelist E.M. Forster, who lived at the von Arnim estate in 1905, working as a tutor to the family's children, wrote that there was in fact not much of a garden. "‘The German Garden itself ... did not make much impression.’ ... ‘[The house] appeared to be surrounded by paddocks and shrubberies’ while ‘in the summer’, he notes, ‘some flowers – mainly pansies, tulips, roses [appeared] ... and there were endless lupins ... [that] the Count was drilling for agricultural purposes’. But, Forster adds, ‘there was nothing of a show’."

Count von Arnim sold the estate in 1910 due to financial problems. The manor house was destroyed in a WWII British air raid on 6 January 1944.

== The text ==
The published text exists in two versions.

The first was published simultaneously in London and New York by Macmillan in September 1898. It contains one diary entry for November, dated the 10th, and beginning "Last night we had ten degrees of frost ...".

The second, or "new edition with additions", was published simultaneously in London and New York by Macmillan in July 1900. It contains two entries for November:

- a long, new entry for 11th November, beginning "When the gray November weather came ..."
- followed by the original November entry beginning "Last night we had ten degrees of frost ...", now renamed from 10th November to 20th November.

Publishers, including on occasion Macmillan, continued to reprint the original version after 1900, and it has proven difficult to dislodge. It was used for influential reissues by Virago (London, 1985) and Penguin (London, 2018), although neither gives a reason for their choice. One of the few modern editions featuring the second version is the one in large print published by the Ulverscroft Foundation (Leicester, 2016). Project Gutenberg also uses the second version.

== Plot summary ==
A semi-autobiographical story in the style of a year's diary written by the protagonist, Elizabeth. It is set on her husband's family estate at Nassenheide, Pomerania. Elizabeth gently mocks her husband, family and others around her as she describes her efforts to develop a garden on the estate. It includes commentary on nature and bourgeois German society, but is primarily humorous due to Elizabeth's frequent mistakes and her idiosyncratic outlook on life.

She looked down upon the frivolous fashions of her time writing “I believe all needlework and dressmaking is of the devil, designed to keep women from study.”

== In popular culture ==
In the ITV series Downton Abbey, in the second episode of the second season, Joseph Molesley, Matthew Crawley's valet, lends a copy of Elizabeth and her German Garden to the head housemaid Anna Smith as a tentative romantic gesture.

In July 2015, it was adapted in five episodes for the Book at Bedtime series on BBC Radio 4, and read by Caroline Martin.

In the novel The Shell Seekers (1988) by Rosamunde Pilcher, Sophie reads Elizabeth and her German Garden. In chapter 9 ("Sophie“), Sophie says to Penelope: "I always go back to it. It comforts me. Soothes me. It reminds me of a world that once existed and will exist again when the war has finished."

In the novel The Guernsey Literary and Potato Peel Pie Society, it is referred to by Elizabeth as having been the topic of discussion at the society meeting that she pretended had taken place on the night of the roast pork dinner.

== Literature ==
- Eberle, Iwona: Eve with a Spade: Women, Gardens, and Literature in the Nineteenth Century. Munich: Grin, 2011. ISBN 9783640843558
- Haines, Sheila. ‘Angles had everywhere taken the place of curves’: Elizabeth von Arnim and the German Garden. In: Turn of the Century Women 2.2 (1985): 36-41.
- Howard, Elizabeth Jane. Introduction to Elizabeth and Her German Garden, by Elizabeth von Arnim. London: Virago, 1985. v-xii.
- Kellaway, Deborah. Gardening writers. In: The Cambridge Guide to Women’s Writing in English. Ed. Lorna Sage, advis. eds. Germaine Greer et al. Cambridge: Cambridge University Press, 1999. 263f.
- Paparunas, Penny. Geschlechterdiskurs um 1900 – Review of Elizabeth von Arnim's 'Elisabeth und ihr Garten'. Frauenzeitung 2 (2007): 41.
- Roemhild, Juliane. Feminity and Authorship in the Novels of Elizabeth von Arnim. New Jersey, Fairleigh Dickinson University Press 2014.
- Trodd, Anthea. Elizabeth and Her German Garden. In: The Cambridge Guide to Women's Writing in English. Ed. Lorna Sage, advis. eds. Germaine Greer et al. Cambridge: Cambridge University Press, 1999. 219.
