= Dobra, Police County =

Dobra
- Village
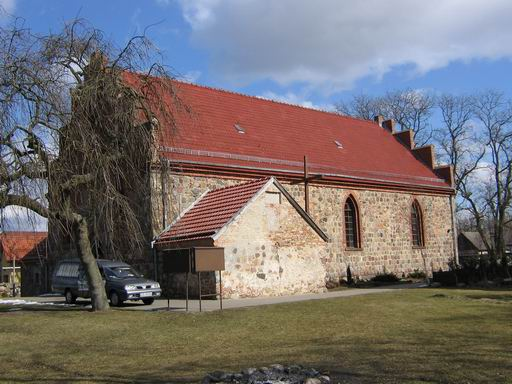
- Church

- Location within Poland
- Coordinates: 53°29′13″N 14°23′3″E
- Country: Poland
- Voivodeship: West Pomeranian
- County: Police
- Gmina: Dobra
- Population: 950

Dobra [ˈdɔbra], colloquially Dobra Szczecińska, (German: Daber) is a village in Police County, West Pomeranian Voivodeship, in north-western Poland, close to the German border. It is the seat of the gmina (administrative district) called Gmina Dobra. It lies approximately 14 km (9 mi) south-west of Police and 16 km (10 mi) north-west of the regional capital Szczecin.

The village has a population of 950.
