= Germany–Poland border =

International border

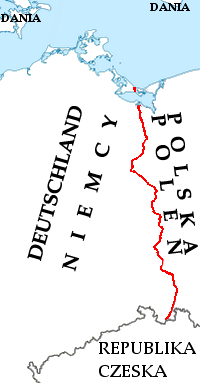
- Germany–Poland border

Characteristics
- Entities: Germany Poland
- Length: 467 kilometres (290 mi)

History
- Established: 1918
- Current shape: 13 June 1989
- Treaties: Treaty of Zgorzelec (1950); East Germany–Poland Maritime Boundary Delimitation Agreement (1989); German–Polish Border Treaty (1990)

The Germany–Poland border (German: Grenze zwischen Deutschland und Polen; Polish: Granica polsko-niemiecka) is the state border between Poland and Germany, mostly along the Oder–Neisse line, with a total length of 467 km (290 mi). It stretches from the Baltic Sea in the north to the Czech Republic in the south.

== History ==
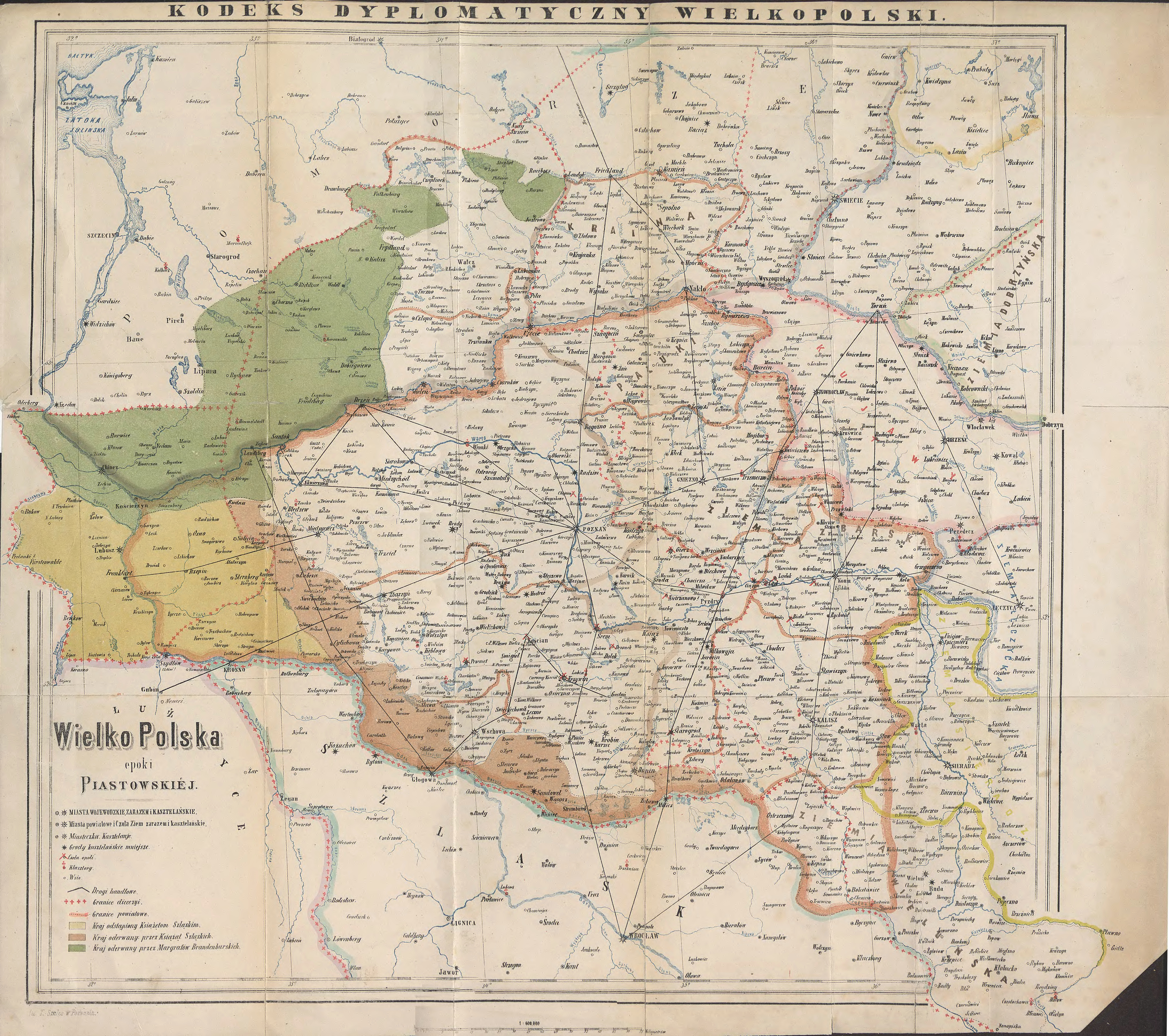
19th-century map of the 13th-century Duchy of Greater Poland of then-fragmented Poland. Territories annexed by the Margraviate of Brandenburg from Poland marked in yellow (Lubusz Land) and green (northwestern Greater Poland)

The Germany–Poland border traces its origins to the beginnings of the Polish state, with the Oder (Odra) and Lusatian Neisse (Nysa) rivers (the Oder–Neisse line) being one of the earliest natural boundaries of the early Polish state under the Piast dynasty, although not necessarily yet a border with Germany, as present-day north-eastern Germany was still inhabited by Slavic Lechitic tribes, and German conquests and sovereignty over the tribes were periodic and intermittent. Under the first Polish rulers Mieszko I and Bolesław I the Brave, the Polish western border reached further west than the present one, and Poland bordered the German-ruled marches of Lusatia and Meissen in the southern section of the western border, while the northern section marked the border with the Slavic Lechitic Lutician federation. Polish victories against invading German forces at Cedynia (972) and Niemcza (1017) secured the early western border of Poland.

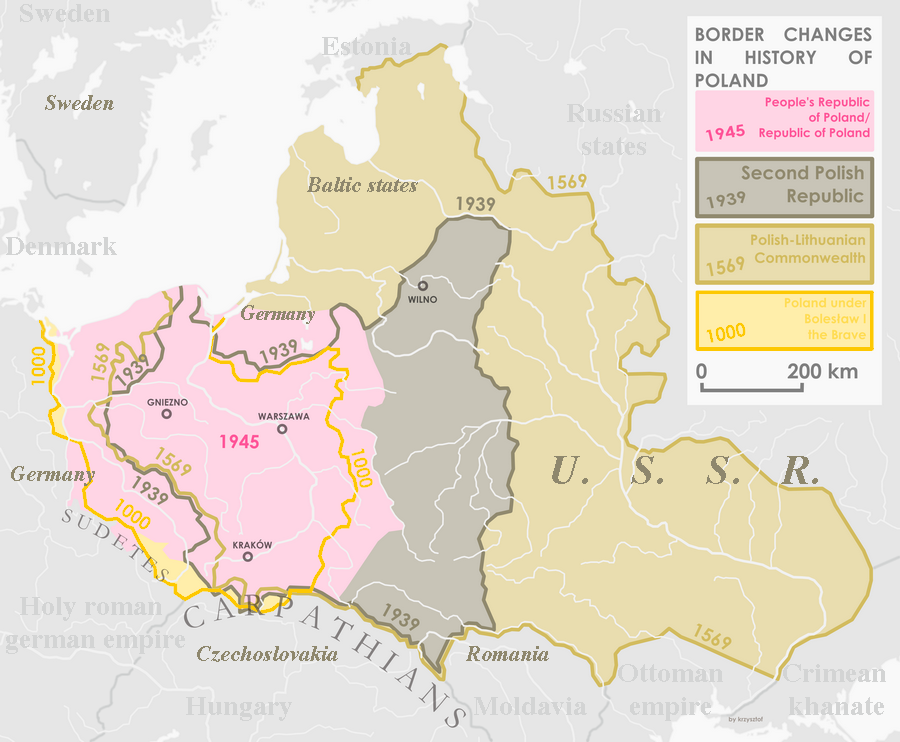
History of border changes of Poland

Between the 11th and 14th centuries, the German-Polish border moved west or east in various sections at various times. In the early 14th century there were significant shifts of the borders to the east and west in various sections, as a result of which Wałcz and Czaplinek fell to the German-ruled Margraviate of Brandenburg, and Senftenberg and Zittau passed to the Polish-ruled Duchy of Jawor, however, several decades later both territories were lost by the aforementioned principalities and the border stabilized, in a more eastern course than at present, although the southern section formed not a German-Polish border, but a Bohemian-Polish border until the 1740s. The border disappeared in the late 18th century with the partitions of Poland, in which Poland's neighbors, including the Kingdom of Prussia, annexed all of its territories. In 1871 Prussia became part of the German Empire.

After Poland regained independence following World War I and the 123 years of partitions, a long German-Polish border was settled on, 1,912 km (1,188 mi) long (including a 607 km (377 mi) border with East Prussia). The border was partially shaped by the Treaty of Versailles and partially by plebiscites (East Prussian plebiscite and the Silesian plebiscite; the former also affected by the Silesian Uprisings). The shape of that border roughly resembled that of pre-partition Poland. Germany repeatedly contested the interwar border and even Poland's existence itself, as stated by Chief of the German Army Hans von Seeckt already in 1922, and it was the German invasion of Poland in 1939 that started World War II.

German and Polish boundary markers

After World War II, the border was drawn from Świnoujście in the north at the Baltic Sea southward to the Czech Republic (then part of Czechoslovakia) border with Poland and Germany near Zittau. It follows the Oder–Neisse line of the Oder (Odra) and Neisse (Nysa) rivers through most of their course. This was agreed upon by the main Allies of World War II – the Soviet Union, the United States, and the United Kingdom, at the Soviets' insistence, and, without any significant consultations with Poland (or Germany), at the Yalta Conference and Potsdam Conference. Soviet foreign minister Vyacheslav Molotov, replied to Mikołajczyk's question about the western border of Poland that "it should be based on the Oder River". At the summit in Yalta, the leaders of the powers decided to hand over to Poland part of East Prussia with Olsztyn and Elbląg, Pomerania with Gdańsk and Szczecin, Lower and Upper Silesia with Opole, Wrocław and Gliwice, and eastern Lubusz Land. On July 24, for the only time in history, the communist Bierut and the oppositionist Stanisław Mikołajczyk spoke with one voice, fighting for the Oder and Western Neisse line. Churchill insisted on Eastern Neisse, which meant that Wałbrzych with its region and Jelenia Góra would remain German. Just before the final protocol was signed, Soviet diplomats made one more amendment according to which the border was to run "west of Świnoujście". Like a trifle, but thanks to this Szczecin got free access to the Baltic Sea.

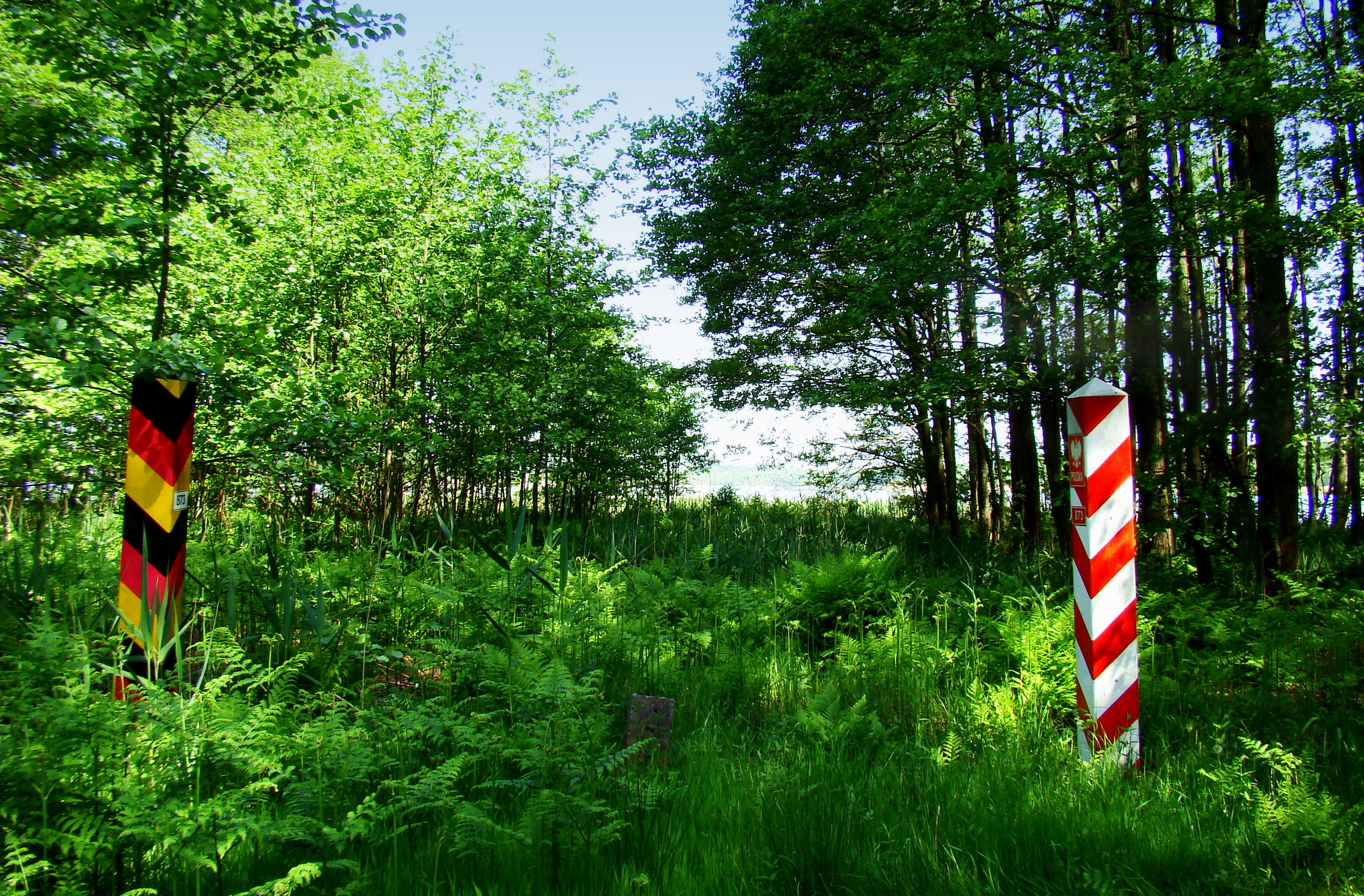
Boundary stones of Germany and Poland in the Ueckermünde Heath

This border was a compensation to Poland for territories lost to the Soviet Union as a consequence of the Molotov–Ribbentrop Pact, and resulted in significant westward transfers of German population from the "Recovered Territories". It roughly matched the centuries-old, historical border between the medieval Polish and German states. It divided several river cities into two parts: Görlitz/Zgorzelec, Guben/Gubin, Frankfurt (Oder)/Słubice, Bad Muskau/Łęknica.

It also divided the island of Usedom/Uznam, the Ueckermünde Heath and the Muskau Park/Park Mużakowski, now a UNESCO World Heritage Site.

An urgent issue in the west was the delineation of a border section from Świnoujście to Gryfino in the terrain. Until autumn 1945, these areas, except Szczecin, were not yet included in the Polish administration. This section of the border was delineated in September and October 1945 by the Polish-Soviet mixed commission. By the signed agreement, the Polish administration took them over on 4 October 1945. Although the western border was delineated in detail, some details turned out to be absurd. The statement of the Potsdam conference that the border should run "directly" west of Świnoujście was put into action so literally that even the water intake for the city of Świnoujście was left on the other side of the border. This situation meant that over the years corrections were made to the previously set border route. It was already established in September 1945 that Poland would depart from the German side of Rieth and Altwarp in exchange for Stolec, Buk, Bobolin, Barnisław, Rosówek, Pargowo and the Stobno-Kołbaskowo road. In 1949, however, the border was adjusted at the height of the intersection and the Links-Neu Lienken-Buk road. It was agreed that the entire intersection in Nowe Linky would go to the side of the German Democratic Republic, in exchange for a narrow strip of land lying directly on the west side of the road from Nowe Linki to Buk.

In January 1951, an act was drawn up to delineate the border between the Polish People's Republic and the German Democratic Republic (East Germany), confirming the Polish administration of the islands between the Western Oder and Regalica (Międzyodrze) south of Gryfino. In November 1950, the government of East Germany agreed to the transfer of a water intake to Poland, located at Lake Wolgastsee. In June 1951, an area of 76.5 ha (together with a water treatment plant) was incorporated into Poland, creating a characteristic salient extending into the German area. In return, a similarly sized area north of Mescherin, including the village of Staffelde (Polish: Staw), was transferred from Poland to the German Democratic Republic.

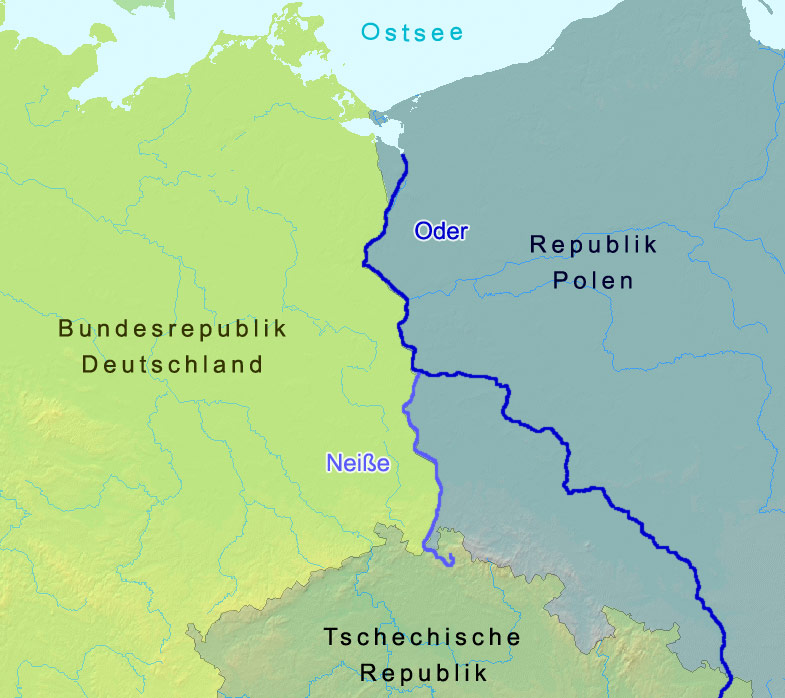
The modern border mostly follows the Oder and Lusatian Neisse rivers

On 6 June 1950 a declaration was signed between the government of the Polish People's Republic and the German Democratic Republic on the demarcation of the existing Polish-German border on the Oder–Neisse line. After the initial agreement, both countries concluded the Treaty of Zgorzelec. The border was recognized by West Germany in 1970 in the Treaty of Warsaw, and by reunified Germany, in 1990 in the German–Polish Border Treaty of 1990. It was subject to minor corrections (land swaps) in 1951. The borders were partially open from 1971 to 1980 when Poles and East Germans could cross it without a passport or a visa; it was however closed again after a few years, due to economic pressure on the East German economy from Polish shoppers and the desire of the East German government to diminish the influence of the Polish Solidarity movement on East Germany.

Following the fall of communism in Poland and Germany, and the German reunification, the border became part of the eastern border of the European Economic Community, then that of the European Union. For a period, it was "the most heavily policed border in Europe". After Poland joined the European Union in 2004, the border controls were relaxed in agreement with the Schengen Agreement to eliminate passport controls by 2007. The modern borderlands of Poland and Germany are inhabited by about one million of those countries' citizens within the counties on each side.

The 2025 Polish–German border crisis is an ongoing crisis between Germany and Poland, sparked by claims of illegal migration encouraged by the German police.

== Border cities and towns ==
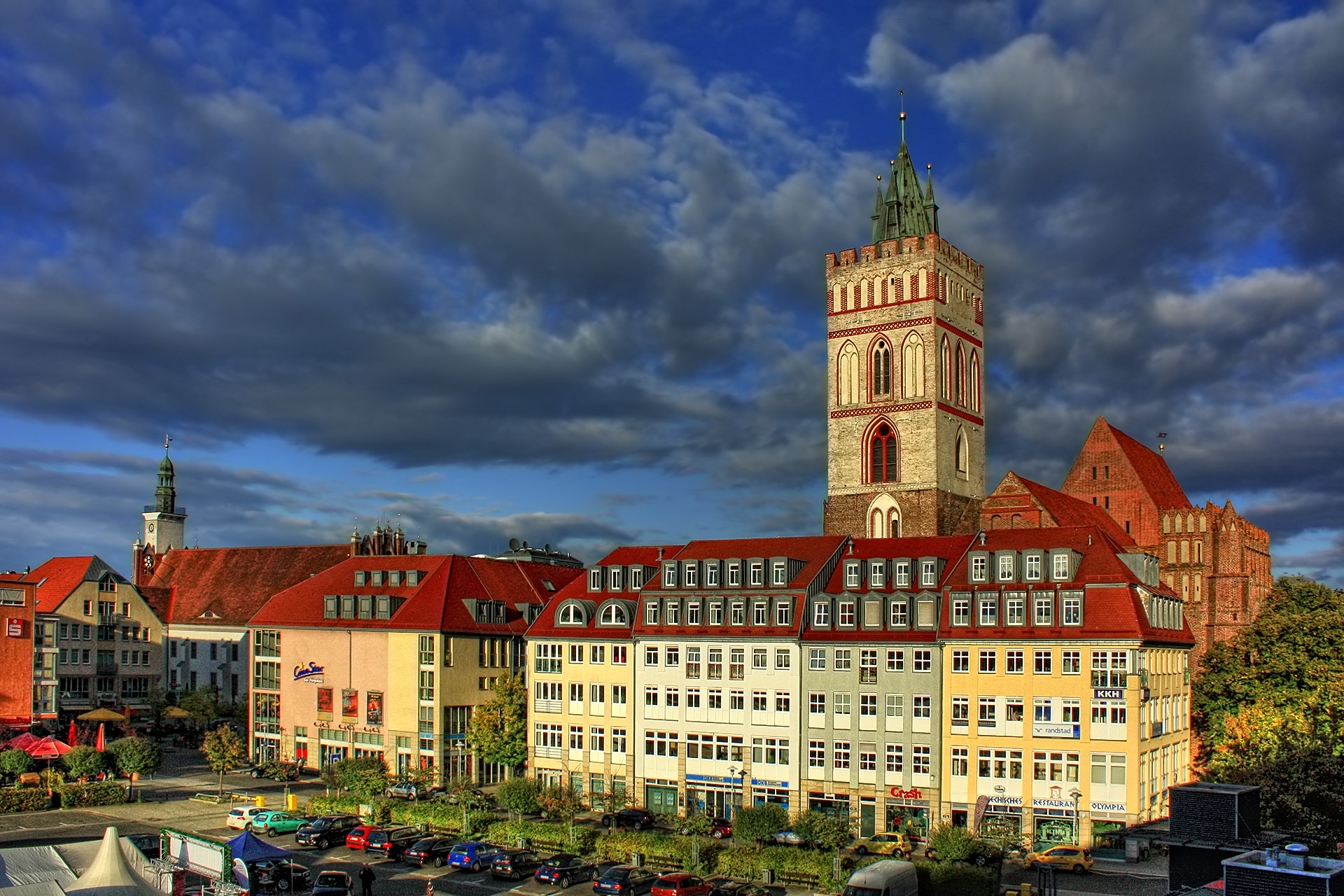
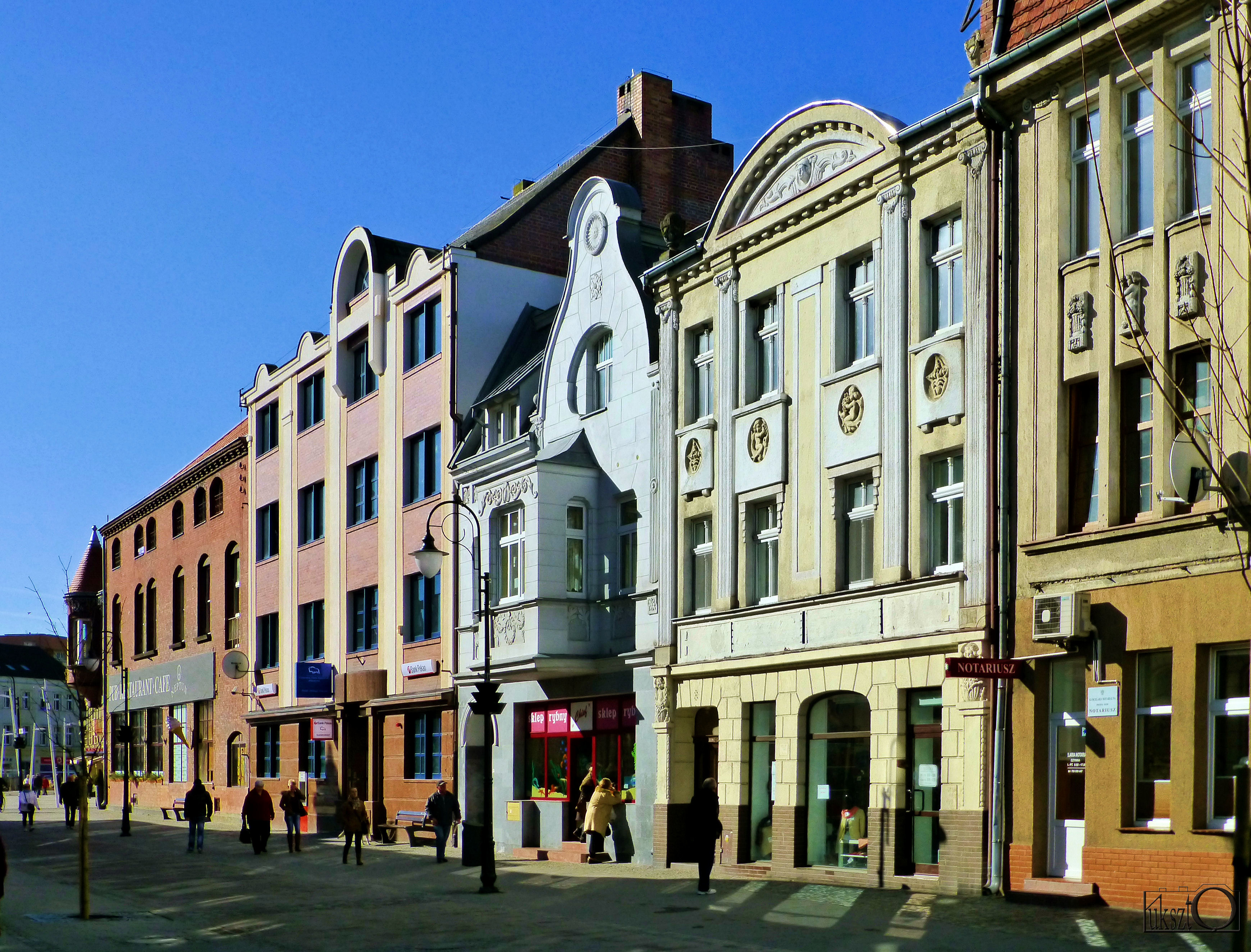
Frankfurt (Oder) is the largest border city on the German side and Świnoujście is the largest border city on the Polish side

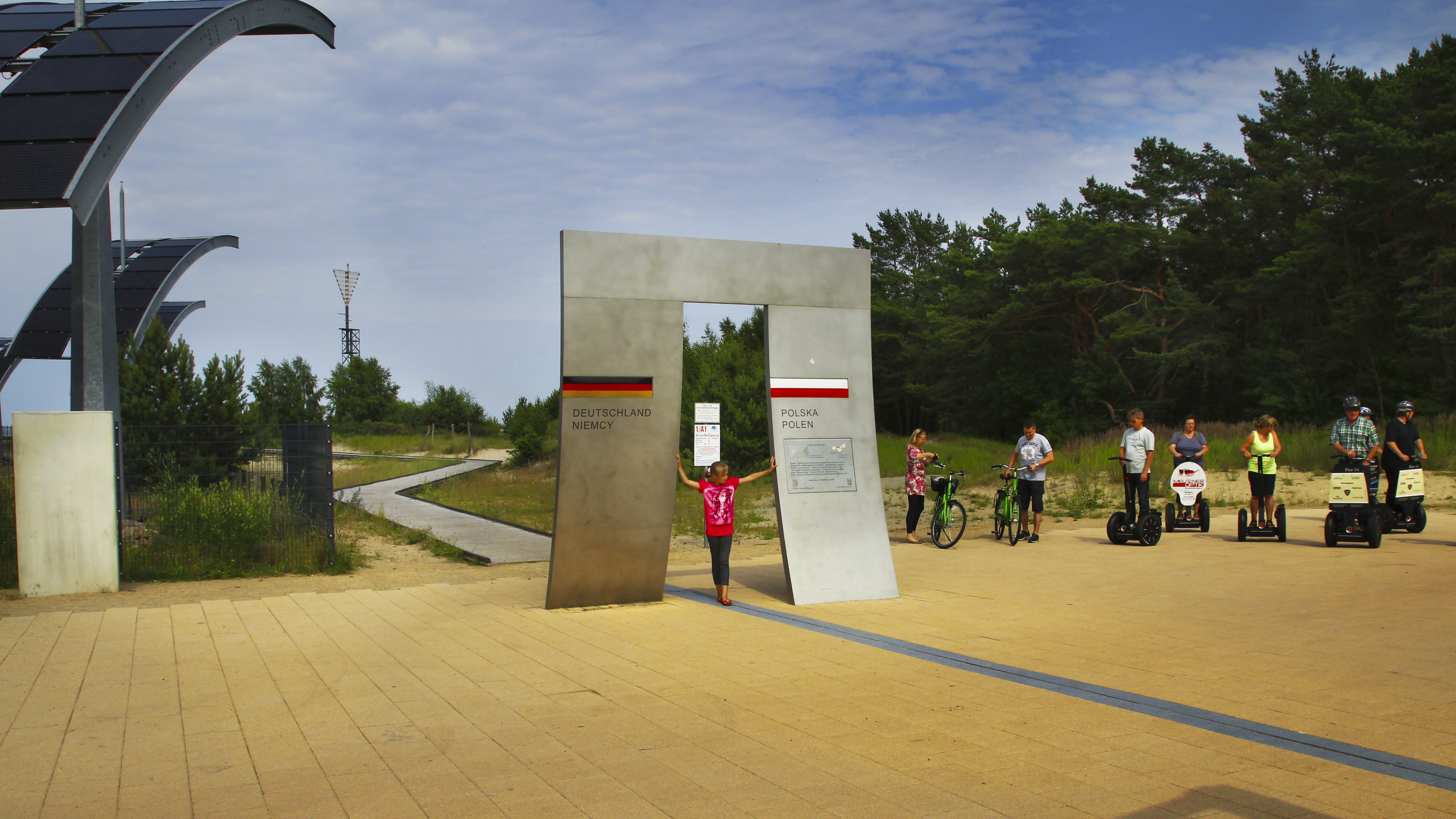
Germany-Poland border between Ahlbeck and Świnoujście

From north to south:

- Świnoujście
- Nowe Warpno
- Gartz
- Bad Freienwalde
- Kostrzyn nad Odrą
- Lebus
- Frankfurt (Oder) and Słubice
- Eisenhüttenstadt
- Gubin and Guben
- Forst (Lausitz)
- Bad Muskau and Łęknica
- Rothenburg, Oberlausitz
- Pieńsk
- Görlitz and Zgorzelec
- Ostritz
- Bogatynia
- Zittau

== See also ==
- Germany–Poland relations
- General Government
- German partition
- Territorial evolution of Germany
- Territorial evolution of Poland
