= Western Pomerania =

Historical region in Germany and Poland

Coordinates: 54.0833°N 13.3833°E

Western Pomerania Vorpommern, Pomorze Przednie
- Historical region
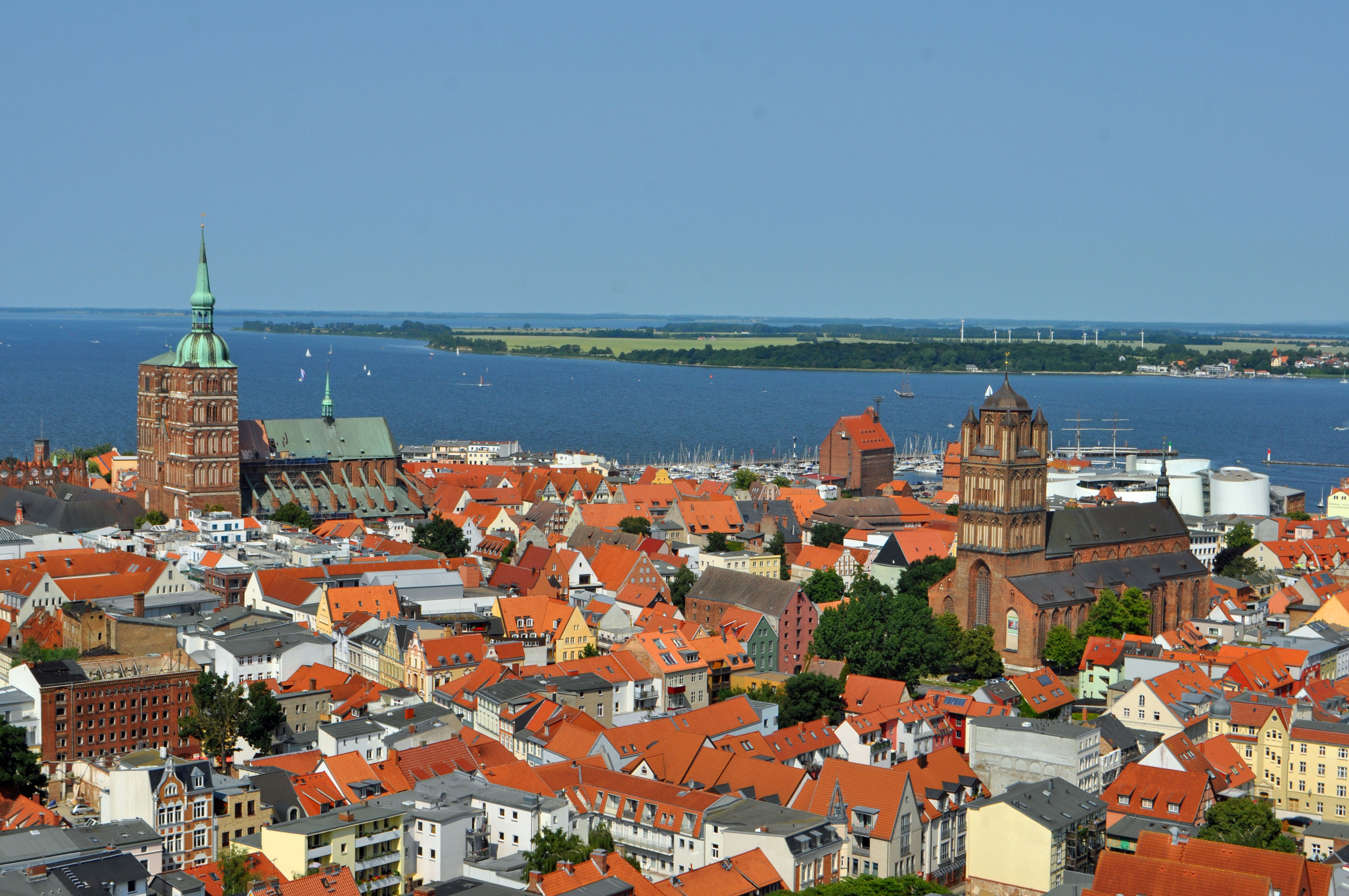
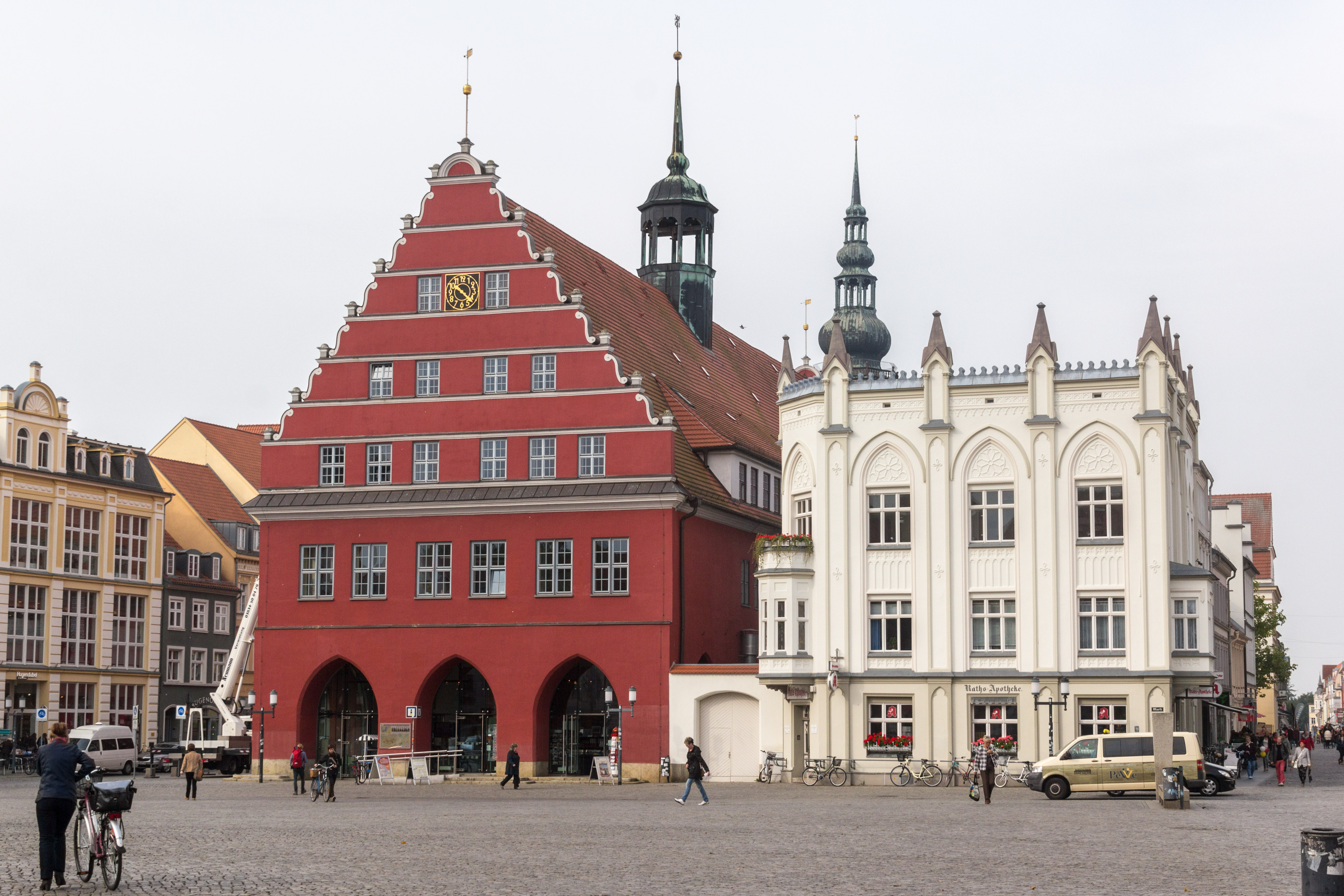
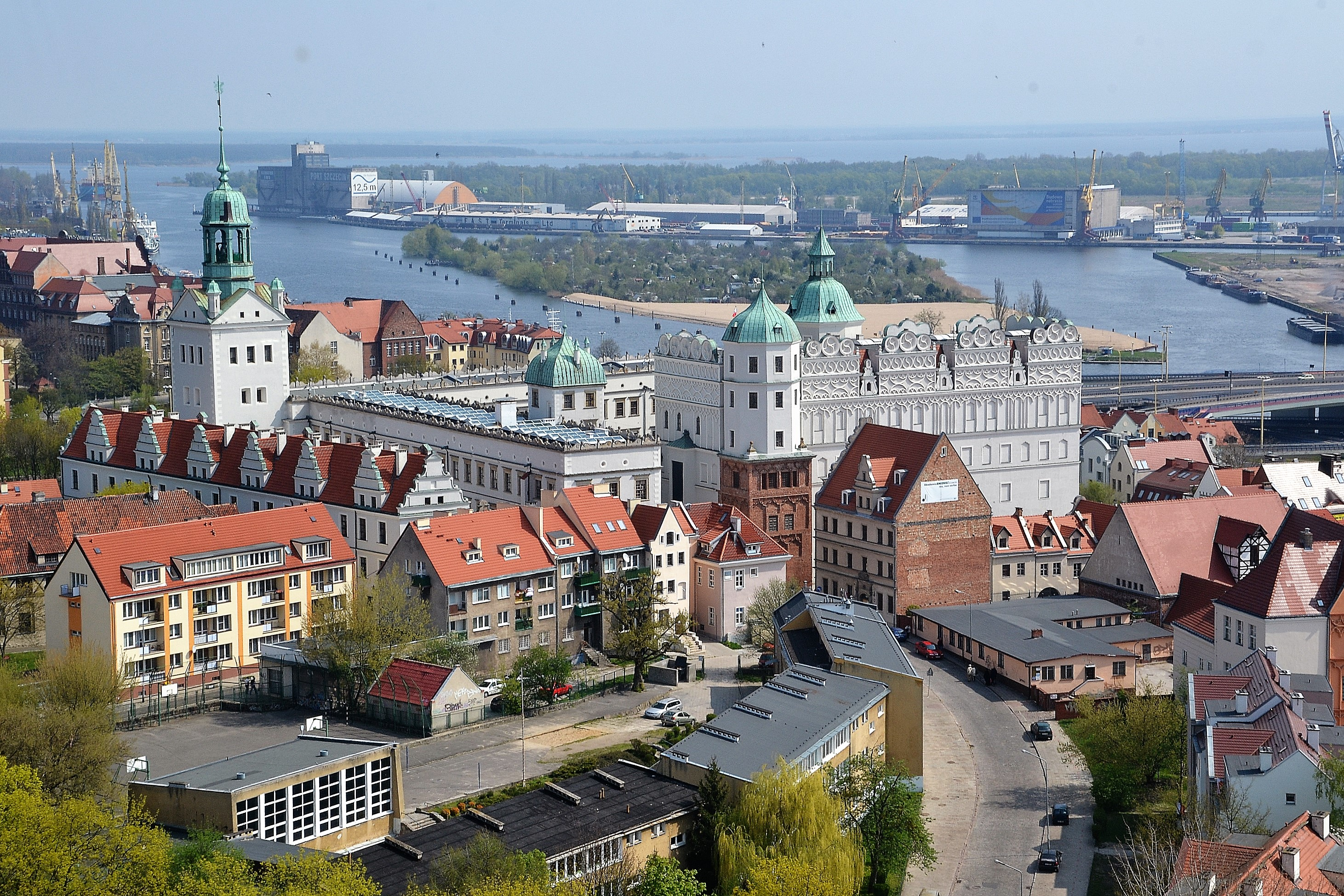
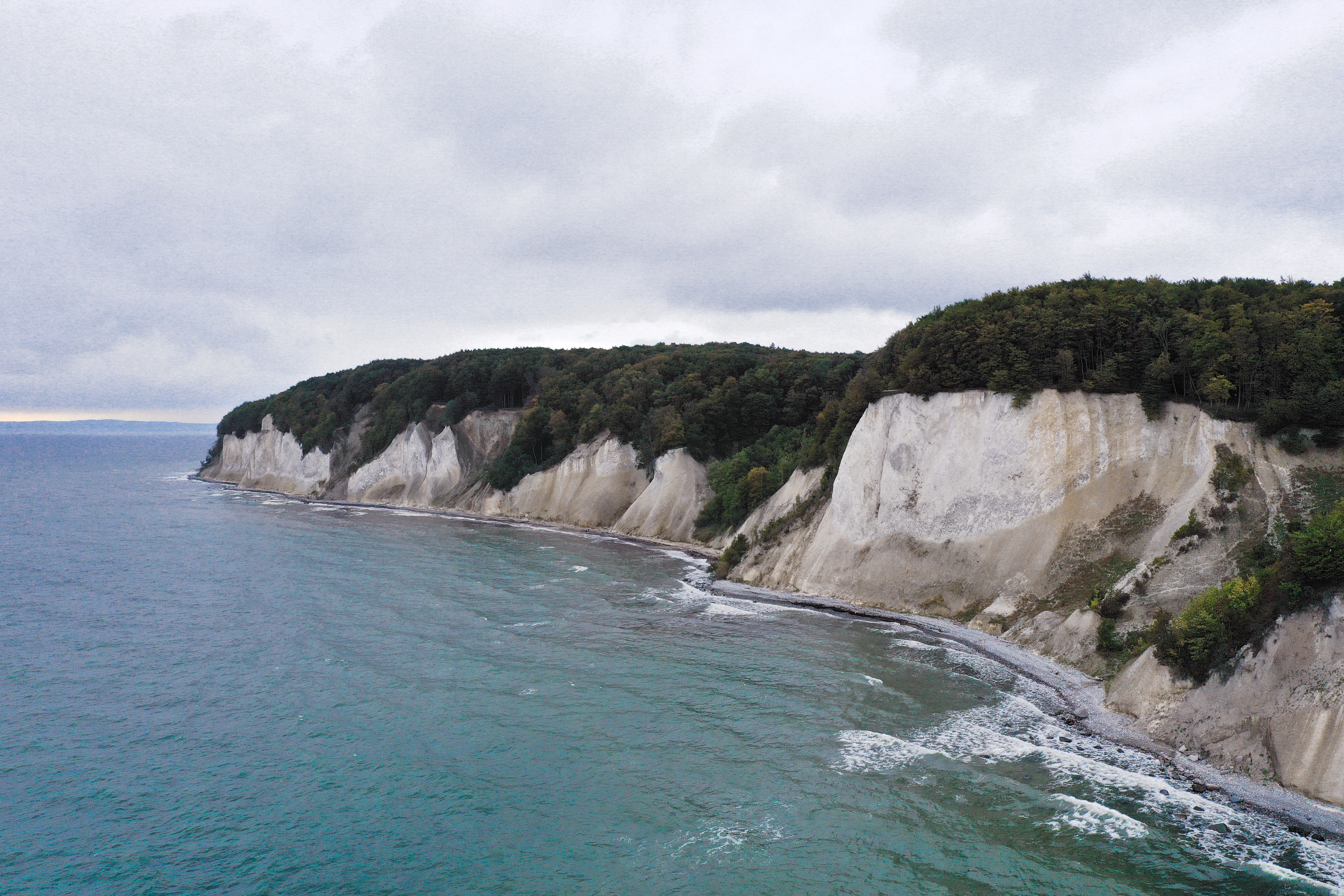
- Stralsund Old Town Greifswald Old Town Ducal Castle, Szczecin Chalk cliffs, Jasmund National Park

- Flag Coat of arms

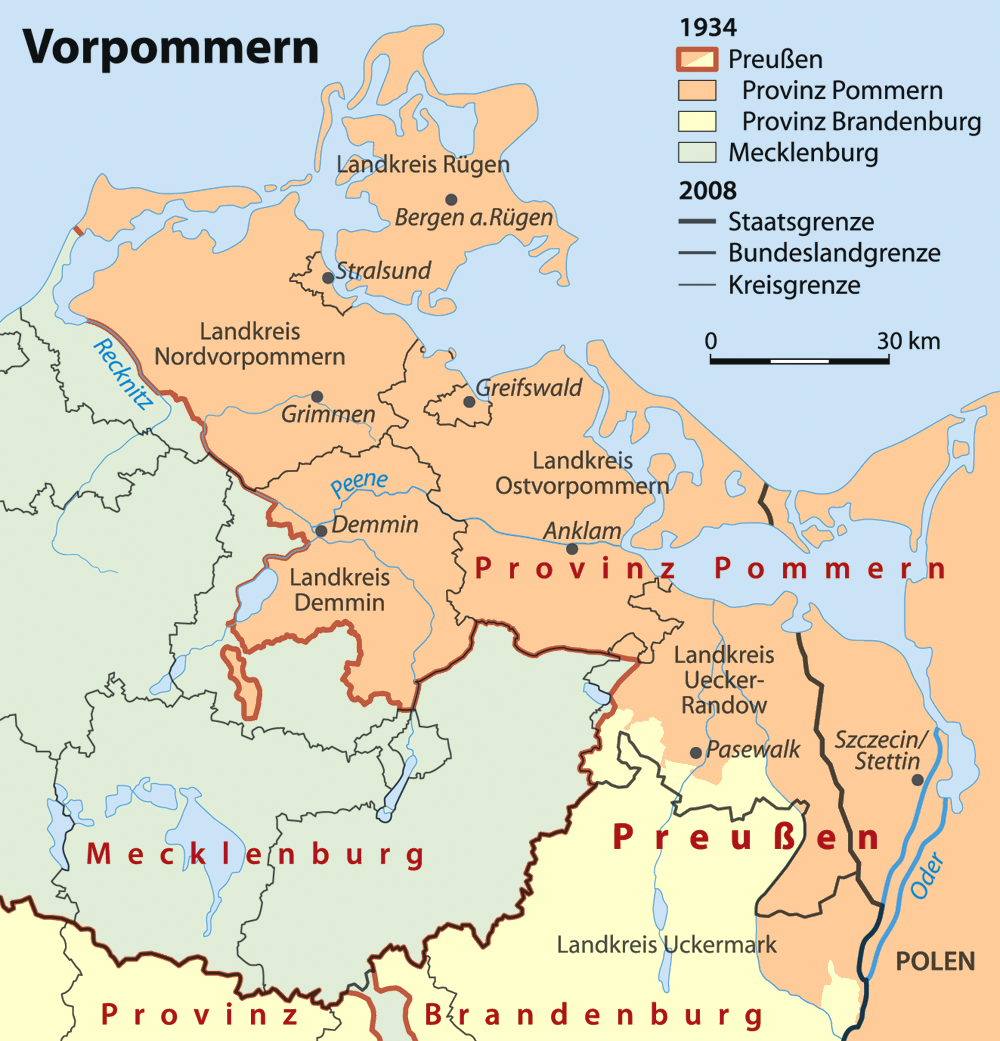
- Current (grey lines) and historical (coloured areas) administrative division of Vorpommern. Historically, the Oder formed the eastern border of Western Pomerania
- Country: Germany; Poland
- Largest city: Szczecin
- Time zone: UTC+1 (CET)
  - Summer (DST): UTC+2 (CEST)

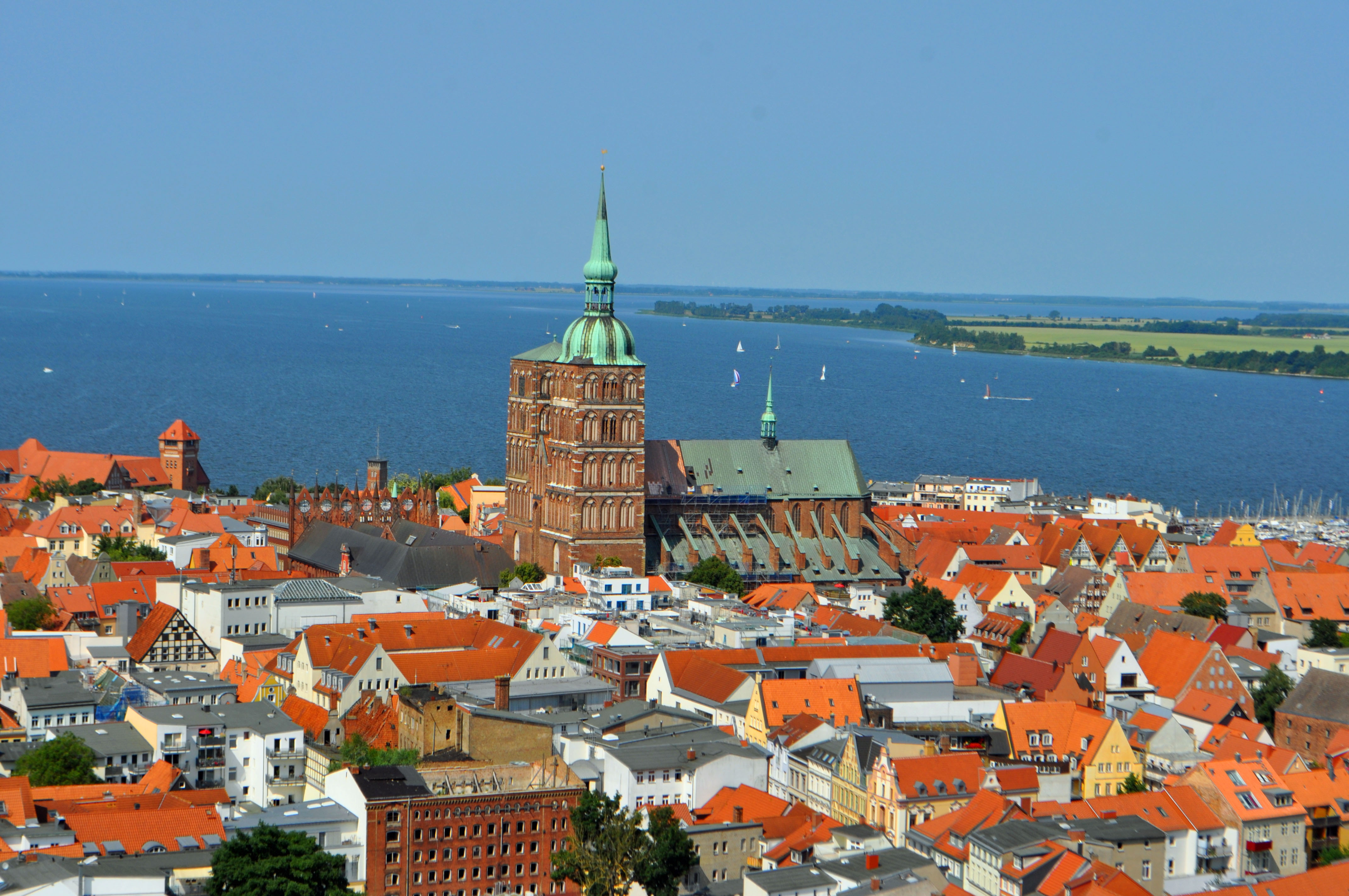
Stralsund (pictured) and Greifswald form the urban center of Western Pomerania

Historical Western Pomerania, also called Cispomerania, Fore Pomerania, Front Pomerania or Hither Pomerania (German: Vorpommern [ˈfoːɐ̯pɔmɐn]; Polish: Pomorze Przednie [pɔˈmɔʐɛ ˈpʂɛdɲɛ]), is the western extremity of the historic region of Pomerania, located mostly in north-eastern Germany, with a small portion in north-western Poland, at the southern coast of the Baltic Sea.

Western Pomerania's boundaries have changed through the centuries as it belonged to various countries such as the Duchy of Pomerania (later part of the Holy Roman Empire), Denmark, Sweden, as well as Prussia which incorporated it as the Province of Pomerania.

Today, the region contains the whole area of Pomerania west of the Oder River, small bridgeheads east of the river, as well as the islands in the Szczecin Lagoon. Its majority forms part of Germany and has been divided between the states of Mecklenburg-Western Pomerania and Brandenburg, with the cities of Stralsund and Greifswald, as well as towns such as Ribnitz-Damgarten (Damgarten only), Bergen auf Rügen (Rügen Island), Anklam, Wolgast, Demmin, Pasewalk, Grimmen, Sassnitz (Rügen Island), Ueckermünde, Torgelow, Barth, and Gartz. The cities of Szczecin and Świnoujście, as well as the towns of Police, Goleniów, Wolin, Międzyzdroje, Nowe Warpno, and (the left-bank part of) Dziwnów are part of Poland. The German part forms about one-third of the present-day north-eastern state of Mecklenburg-Western Pomerania, while the Polish part constitutes the westernmost border areas of the West Pomeranian Voivodeship.

German Western Pomerania had a population of about 470,000 in 2012 (districts of Vorpommern-Rügen and Vorpommern-Greifswald combined) – while the Polish districts of the region had a population of about 520,000 in 2012 (cities of Szczecin, Świnoujście and Police County combined). Overall approximately 1 million people live in the historical region of Western Pomerania today.

== Terminology ==
The German prefix Vor- denotes a location closer to the speaker, and is the equivalent of "Fore"/"Front"/"Hither" in English and Anterior/Citerior/Cis- in Latin (with the corresponding antonyms in German, English and Latin being Hinter-, "Hinder"/"Rear"/"Farther" and Posterior/Ulterior/Trans-, respectively). Historically the name "Hither Pomerania" has been used, but in modern English the German region is more commonly called "Western Pomerania" or by its native name. The formerly widespread local dialect term is Low German: Vörpommern.

The name Pomerania comes from Slavic po more, which means "land by the sea". The adjective for the region is (Western) Pomeranian (German: pommersch, Polish: pomorski), inhabitants are called (Western) Pomeranians (German: Pommern, Polish: Pomorzanie). The Polish names for the historical region, Pomorze Zachodnie (Western Pomerania) or Pomorze Nadodrzańskie (Oder Pomerania), have usually been applied to the entire narrower Pomerania, including Farther Pomerania, but excluding Pomerelia. In the narrower sense, the designation may also refer to the western part of the area only, alternatively called for precision Pomorze Szczecińskie (Szczecin Pomerania), encompassing the entire German Pomerania combined with the Polish part of the historical Middle Pomerania up to Rega. In such case, the remainder of Farther Pomerania is called Pomorze Środkowe (contemporary Middle Pomerania) or Pomorze Koszalińsko-Słupskie (Koszalin-Słupsk Pomerania).

As a further complication, the borders of the eponymous administrative units have been drawn disregarding mostly the historical ones. The Polish unit called województwo zachodniopomorskie (West Pomeranian Voivodeship) includes the whole Polish part of Hither Pomerania, but only the western two-thirds of Farther Pomerania, with the remaining easternmost one-third (Słupsk, Ustka, Miastko) forming a part of the neighbouring województwo pomorskie (Pomeranian Voivodeship). On the other hand, it stretches far more south than the historical region, to include the northern part of the historical Neumark (Dębno, Chojna, Trzcińsko-Zdrój, Myślibórz, Nowogródek Pomorski, Lipiany, Barlinek, Pełczyce, Suchań, Choszczno, Recz, Drawno), as well as a strip the historical Greater Poland (Tuczno, Człopa, Mirosławiec, Wałcz, Czaplinek), or even a small part of Pomerelia (Biały Bór). As a consequence, the common understanding of the term West Pomerania has recently started to shift towards this current administrative extent. Similarly, borders of the German districts Vorpommern-Rügen and Vorpommern-Greifswald deviate from the historical ones in numerous locations.

The name Pomorze Przednie, Przedpomorze – corresponding to Hither/Fore Pomerania German: Vorpommern – is nowadays used in Polish almost exclusively when referring to the part located in Germany, while its usage in the full (historical German) meaning is limited to exact translations of German texts. It is also referred to as Pomorze Wołogoskie (Wolgast Pomerania).

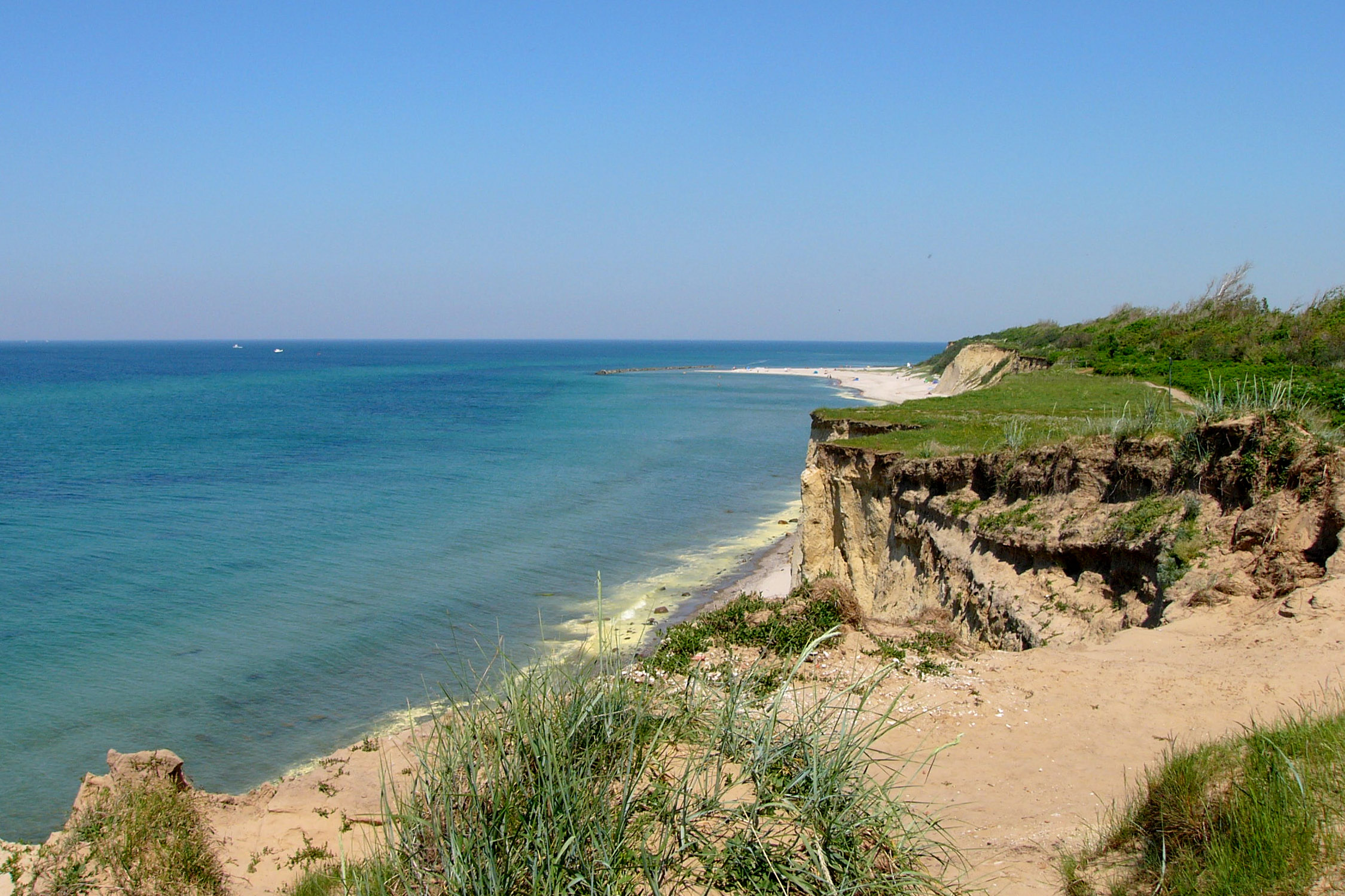
Western Pomerania is famous for its sandy beaches along the Baltic Sea, its islands such as Rügen, Usedom and Hiddensee – and the many lagoons, part of them protected in the Western Pomerania Lagoon Area National Park. The photo shows the steep coast at Darss West Beach, near Ahrenshoop.

== Geography ==
The major feature of Western Pomerania is its long Baltic Sea and lagoons coastline. Typical is a distinct "double coast", whereby offshore islands separate lagoons (so-called bodden) from the open sea, forming a unique landscape. The islands Kirr, Hiddensee, Ummanz, Dänholm, Rügen, Öhe, Riems, Vilm, Greifswalder Oie, Usedom, Karsibór and Wolin, as well as the islands of the city of Szczecin are located in Western Pomerania.

The largest city in Western Pomerania is Szczecin on the Polish side and Stralsund on the German side. Today it is still an important town economically. The towns of Stralsund and Greifswald together, after Rostock, are the second largest centres of population in Mecklenburg-Vorpommern. In addition the region has the highest population density of the four planning regions in the state.

Western Pomerania has several national parks:

- Jasmund National Park
- West Pomeranian Lagoon Area National Park
- Wolin National Park

Another region in Western Pomerania under extensive conservation protection is the Peene Valley.

== Administrative subdivisions ==
German Vorpommern is understood today as comprising the islands of Rügen and Usedom and the nearby mainland, roughly matching the administrative districts of Vorpommern-Rügen and Vorpommern-Greifswald, though those districts' boundaries with Mecklenburg proper do not match the pre-1945 demarcation.

The region is mentioned in the Mecklenburg-Western Pomerania state constitution as one of the two constituting regions of the state with the right to form a Landschaftsverband, which is an administrative entity subordinate only to the state level. Consideration was given during an unsuccessful district reform project in 1994 to restoring the old boundary, but this was not implemented. The Ribnitz, Marlow and Fischland area of Vorpommern-Rügen were historically part of Mecklenburg. The old western boundary line was preserved in the division between the two Protestant church bodies of the Evangelical Lutheran State Church of Mecklenburg and the Pomeranian Evangelical Church prior to their absorption into the Evangelical Lutheran Church in Northern Germany.

The Polish part encompasses the cities with powiat rights of Szczecin and Świnoujscie, the entire Police County, Gmina Goleniów in Goleniów County, as well as the part of Kamień County located on the island of Wolin (Gmina Międzyzdroje, western part of Gmina Wolin and western part of Gmina Dziwnów).

=== Cities and towns ===
There are four cities in the region, namely Szczecin and Świnoujście on the Polish side, as well as Stralsund and Greifswald on the German side of the border. Major towns in the German part of the region include Bergen auf Rügen, Demmin, Anklam, Wolgast and Pasewalk. The municipalities of Binz, Zingst, Zinnowitz and Heringsdorf do not have town rights, but are in fact semi-urban localities, with the latter of them covering the area known as Dreikaiserbäder (three emperors baths) consisting of the former municipalities of Ahlbeck, Bansin and Heringsdorf. Towns in the Polish part include Police, Goleniów, Wolin, Międzyzdroje, Nowe Warpno, and the left-bank part of Dziwnów. In addition, the highly populated villages of Mierzyn, Przecław, Warzymice and Bezrzecze constitute in fact direct residential extensions of the city of Szczecin, consisting mostly of large housing estates, thus having along with the resort locality of Trzebież a semi-urban character, in spite of neither holding town rights nor being seats of a municipality, and despite being several-fold more populated than the seats of the respective municipalities that they are parts of.

You can sort this complete table of cities and towns by clicking one of the upper columns. The list does not include the former town of Dąbie, which currently is a neighbourhood of Szczecin; it also does not include the Brandenburgian city of Schwedt whose parts located north of Wesel, acquired in contemporary times, belong to historic Western Pomerania.

Town or (bold) city in Germany/Poland	Coat of Arms	District of Mecklenburg-Western Pomerania or (bold) Brandenburg/ County of West Pomeranian Voivodeship	first mentioned	Town privileges	Area in km^{2}	Population at 31 December 2013	Image
Szczecin	Coat of arms of the City of Szczecin	city with powiat rights		1243	301.30	408105	Oder Terraces of Szczecin/Stettin
Hanseatic City of Stralsund	coat of arms of the Hanseatic City of Stralsund	Vorpommern-Rügen	1234	1234	38.97	55481	World Heritage Old Town of Stralsund at the Baltic Sea
Hanseatic and University City of Greifswald	coat of arms of the Hanseatic and University City of Greifswald	Vorpommern-Greifswald	1241	1250	50.50	56154	Ernst-Moritz-Arndt-Universität Greifswald
Świnoujście	Coat of arms of the City of Świnoujście	city with powiat rights		1765	197.23	41371	City panorama
Police	coat of arms of the town of Police	Police County	1243	1260	36.84	33625	Police
Goleniów	coat of arms of the town of Goleniów	Goleniów County	1220	1268	11.74	22776	Medieval defensive walls
Bergen auf Rügen	coat of arms of the town of Bergen auf Rügen	Vorpommern-Rügen	1314	1613	51.42	13394	Bergens ältestes Fachwerkhaus am Markt, im Hintergrund die St. Marienkirche
Anklam	coat of arms of the town of Anklam	Vorpommern-Greifswald	1243	1264	56.57	11793	Peene Harbour of Anklam
Wolgast	coat of arms of the town of Wolgast	Vorpommern-Greifswald	1123	1257	61.52	10859	Main square in Wolgast
Demmin	coat of arms of the town of Demmin	Mecklenburgische Seenplatte	1070	1236	81.56	10001	Main square in Demmin
Pasewalk	coat of arms of the town of Pasewalk	Vorpommern-Greifswald	1121	1251	54.99	9590	Amtsgericht von Pasewalk
Grimmen	coat of arms of the town of Grimmen	Vorpommern-Rügen	1267	1287	50.29	9274	Der Grimmener Wasserturm
Sassnitz	coat of arms of the town of Sassnitz	Vorpommern-Rügen	1906	1957	46.45	8879	Hängebrücke zum Sassnitzer Hafen
Torgelow	coat of arms of the town of Torgelow	Vorpommern-Greifswald	1281	1945	49.46	8755	Christuskirche in Torgelow
Ueckermünde	coat of arms of the town of Ueckermünde	Vorpommern-Greifswald	1178	1260	84.69	8651	Strand von Ueckermünde
Barth	coat of arms of the town of Barth	Vorpommern-Rügen	1255	1255	40.83	8235	Lange Strasse in Barth
Międzyzdroje	coat of arms of the town of Międzyzdroje	Kamień County	15th century	1945	4.51	5425	Beach in Międzyzdroje
Altentreptow	coat of arms of the town of Altentreptow	Mecklenburgische Seenplatte	1245	1282	52.83	4903	Town hall at market square, Protestant church of St. Petri
Wolin	coat of arms of the town of Wolin	Kamień County	966	1267	14.41	4999	town panorama
Eggesin	Coat of arms of the town of Eggesin	Vorpommern-Greifswald	1216	1966	88.01	4724	Eggesiner Fachwerkkirche
Loitz	coat of arms of the town of Loitz	Vorpommern-Greifswald	1242	1242	89.53	4157	Die Loitzer Marina mit ehemaligem Kleinbahnhof
Putbus	coat of arms of the town of Putbus	Vorpommern-Rügen	1810	1810	66.60	4488	Circus Putbus
Ribnitz-Damgarten (Damgarten only)	coat of arms of the former town of Damgarten	Vorpommern-Rügen		1258 (Damgarten)		15297 (both parts, 2013); 3289 (Damgarten, 2018)	St.Bartholomäus in Damgarten
Jarmen	coat of arms of the city of Jarmen	Vorpommern-Greifswald	1269	1720	30.64	2716	Port of Jarmen
Gützkow	coat of arms of the town of Gützkow	Vorpommern-Greifswald	1301	1353	42.68	2965	Gützkower Rathaus
Tribsees	coat of arms of the town of Tribsees	Vorpommern-Rügen	1136	1285	54.75	2483	Tribsees and Trebel river
Gartz	coat of arms of the town of Gartz	Uckermark	1124	1249	61.69	2508 (2019)	Gartz Town Hall
Garz/Rügen	coat of arms of the town of Garz/Rügen	Vorpommern-Rügen	1207	1319	65.44	2148	Ernst Moritz Arndt house of birth in Garz
Penkun	coat of arms of the town of Penkun	Vorpommern-Greifswald	1240	1284	78.64	1672	Schlosssee Lake
Usedom	coat of arms of the town of Usedom	Vorpommern-Greifswald	1124	1298	38.54	1483	Town hall and church 8n Usedom
Lassan	coat of arms of the town of Lassan	Vorpommern-Greifswald	1136	1274	27.98	1226	Lassan Marketplace
Franzburg	coat of arms of the town of Franzburg	Vorpommern-Rügen	1231	1587	15.19	1294	Franzburg Town Hall
Richtenberg	coat of arms of the town of Richtenberg	Vorpommern-Rügen	1231	1535	15.62	1294	Richtenberg Town Hall
Nowe Warpno	coat of arms of the town of Nowe Warpno	Police County	1184	1295	24.51	1231	Aerial view of Nowe Warpno
Dziwnów (Dziwna left-bank neighbourhood only)	coat of arms of the town of Dziwnów	Kamień County	1243	2004	4.07 (entire town); 3.04 (Dziwna)	2137 (entire town, 2013); 669 (Dziwna, 2001)	Garrison of the Polish Navy in Dziwna, Dziwnów

== Economy ==
Popular tourist resorts can be found all along the Baltic beaches of the Pomeranian part (Darß-Zingst) of the Fischland-Darß-Zingst peninsula and the islands of Hiddensee, Rügen, Usedom and Wolin. The old Hanseatic towns are also popular tourist destinations due to their brick gothic medieval architecture, downtown Stralsund is a UNESCO World Heritage Site. Stralsund, Greifswald and Wolgast also have a shipyard industry, the Volkswerft in Stralsund and the Peenewerft in Wolgast produce large ships, while the HanseYachts shipyard in Greifswald is specialized in building yachts. In Mukran near Sassnitz on Rügen, there is an international ferry terminal linking Western Pomerania to Sweden, Denmark, Lithuania and other oversee countries. An industrial complex northeast of Lubmin near Greifswald includes a shut-down nuclear power plant which is being deconstructed, and the Nord Stream 1 gas pipeline which come ashore at this site. In Greifswald, the University of Greifswald runs several institutions and the major hospitals of the region. Also, Greifswald is the site of innovative scientific research, like the Wendelstein physics research center and biotechnology enterprises, most notably the federal Friedrich Loeffler Institute for animal diseases like BSE.

Away from the coastal tourist resorts, the rural areas of Western Pomerania have often maintained an agricultural character. A study published on 18 May 2009 revealed that the wealth situation of people in Vorpommern is on a mean range in Germany, with 27% of the population regarded as indigent – that is living with below 60% of an average German income.

== History ==
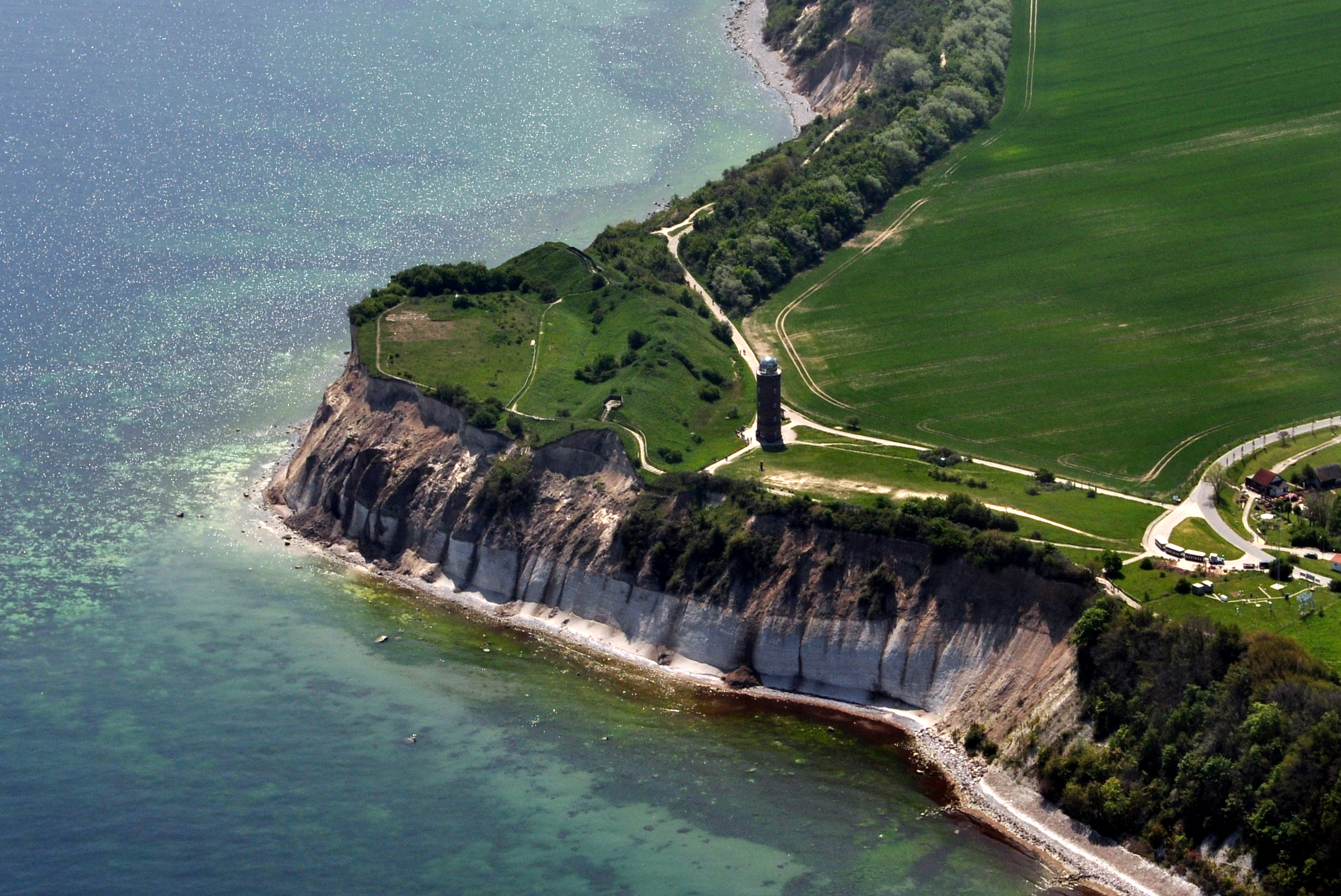
Slavic cult site Jaromarsburg at Cape Arkona, island of Rügen.

=== Era before 1121 ===
In prehistoric times, the area was inhabited by megalith cultures. In the first half of the first millennium, the East Germanic Rugians are reported in the area, who are known to later set up a kingdom far South in Pannonia in the 5th century.

By the 6th and 7th century, West Slavic people populated the region. If they met a substantial Rugian population and whether and/or how these were assimilated by the Slavs is not known. The Slavic inhabitants, also referred to as part of the Wilzen/Veleti, diverged into several small tribes, listed from Northwest to Southeast: The Rujanes or Rani around Rügen, the Circipanes around the Pane (Peene) River, the Redarians around the temple of Rethra, the Wollinians on the isle of Wolin, the Tollensians around the Tollense River and the Ukrainians around the Uecker River in the Uckermark. The collective term Liutizians also covers some of these tribes, as they allied in the late 10th century to secure their sovereignty. The Lutician alliances headquarters were at Rethra, where delegates from the independent allied tribes held their meetings. Whether or not the Rani were part of the Veleti or later the Lutizians is disputed. The Slavic tribes referred to as Pomeranians settled east of the Oder River.

In this era, large mixed Slavic and Scandinavian settlements were built at the natural havens of the bay-rich coast, the most important of which were Ralswiek (Rügen), Altes Lager Menzlin at the Peene River and Wolin, which is assumed to be identical with Vineta and Jomsborg. Important pagan temple sites were Arkona and Rethra. Other local strongholds were Dimin (Demmin) in the Circipan and Stetin (Szczecin) in the Pomeranian area.

At the beginning of the second millennium, western Pomeranian tribes were surrounded by the expanding states of Denmark in the North, Piast Poland in the Southeast and the German Holy Roman Empire in the Southwest. While the eastward expansion of the latter could be halted for some time by a Slavic uprising of the Southern (Heveller) and Western (Obotrites) neighbors of the western Pomeranian tribes, which even was supported by the Liutizian alliance, the Pomeranians East of the Oder River were conquered by the Polish state in the late 10th century and remained vassals of the dynasty of Piasts until 1007, had to pay tribute to the Poles after 1042, and were conquered again in 1121.

=== Duchy of Pomerania (1121/81–1637) and Principality of Rügen (1168–1325) ===
Coat of arms of Duchy of Pomerania, during the reign of Bogislaw X

In spite of his surrender or even with military help from the succeeding Poles, the Pomeranian duke Wartislaw I of the House of Griffins successfully started conquering the areas west of his burgh in Szczecin the years after 1121. These lands were considerably weakened by previous warfare: The coast was raided by the Danes, which destroyed Jomsborg in 1043, shifting the power in the Oder delta South to Pomeranian Stettin. Rethra was raided and devastated by the Germans in winter 1068/69, the Lutizian alliance fell apart, and instead the Lutizian tribes started fighting against each other ("Liutizischer Bruderkrieg", Liutizian civil war).

Wartislaw's aim was not only the expansion of his duchy, but also the spread of the Christian faith. In 1124, he invited Otto von Bamberg to mission in his duchy east of the Oder River. By 1128, Wartislaw I had expanded his duchy west to the County of Gützkow and Circipania and south to the Uckermark. He invited Otto von Bamberg again to mission in these pagan areas West of the Oder River, too. The former Liutizian principalities were turned into castellanies subordinate to the Pomeranian duke, who appointed the castellans. These castellanies were converted from their pagan to Christian religion in Usedom, 1128. Except for the Rani living North of the Ryck River and Demmin, all western Pomeranian territories had become united and Christian. Wartislaw's dependency on Poland loosened in the following years and, in 1135 with the death of Polish king Boleslaw III, Wartislaw's duchy regained independence. About ten years later, he was slain by pagans near Stolpe. Stolpe Abbey was erected at this site by Wartislaw's successor, Ratibor I.

The 1147 Wendish Crusade initiated by the Holy Roman Empire ended when the Demmin and Stettin citizens persuaded the crusaders that they were already Christians.

By the middle of the 12th century, the Principality of Rügen in northwestern Pomerania remained the last pagan state in Central Europe. In 1168, a Danish fleet led by Roskilde archbishop Absalon sacked Rügen. The Arkona temple was sieged and destroyed. After this main temple's fall, Rügen's capitol Charenza (Venzer Burgwall) capitulated, all other temples were given to the Danes for destruction and Jaromar I, Prince of Rügen became a Danish vassal. The Rani then converted to Christianity.

From Rügen, which still had a strong navy and army, the Danish put pressure on Pomerania. Bogislaw I duke of Pomerania made his duchy a part of the Holy Roman Empire (HRE) in 1181, after he had allied with Henry the Lion since 1164. But the new alliance did not prevent the Danes from successfully raiding and in 1186 conquering all of Pomerania. Danish rule ended when in 1227 the Danish navy was defeated in Bornhöved by the Germans, Pomerania except for Rügen (until 1345 with the last Rugian duke's death) fell to the HRE.

=== Colonization and German settlement (since the 12th century) ===
The Rügen and Pomerania dukes called in many German settlers and aristocrats to resettle parts of their duchies devastated in the wars before and to settle new areas by turning woodland into fields. Settlers came from North German Lower Saxony. Some settlers from the Harz mountains in central Germany settled near Stettin. Cities and monasteries were founded. Between the 12th century and 13th century, Western Pomerania changed from a pagan and Slavic to a Christian and German country (Ostsiedlung). The Slavs (Wends) were first excluded from the villages and privileges of the German settlers. They later merged with the German majority. Western Pomerania then was part of the Duchy of Pomerania, the areas north of the Peene River (Principality of Rugia) joined the duchy in 1325.

From that time onwards, the region shares a common history with Farther Pomerania.

=== Swedish (1630/48–1720/1815) and Prussian province (1720/1815–1945) ===
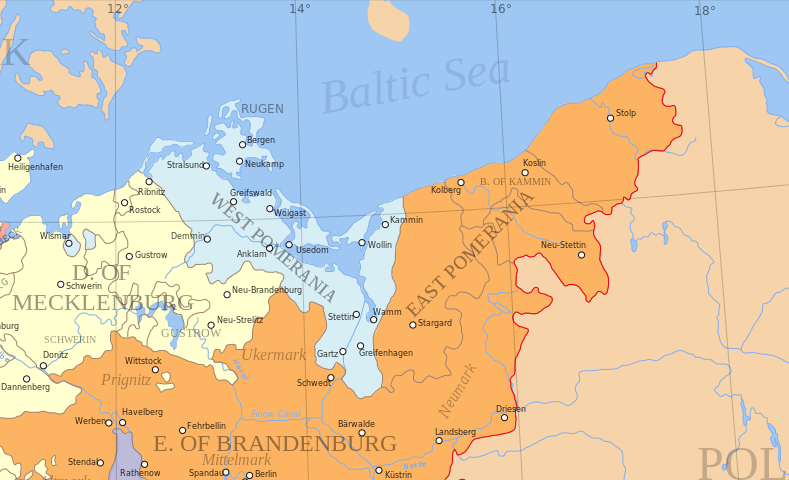
The former Duchy of Pomerania (center) partitioned between the Swedish Empire and Brandenburg after the Treaty of Stettin (1653). Swedish Pomerania (Western Pomerania) is indicated in light blue, Brandenburgian Pomerania (East Pomerania) is shown in orange.

Pomerania came under Swedish military control in 1630 during the Thirty Years' War. Swedish sovereignty over Vorpommern, including Stettin, was confirmed by the Peace of Westphalia (1648) and the Treaty of Stettin (1653), and from that time onwards much of the region formed Swedish Pomerania. Possession of this region remained an issue of conflict in European politics and Swedish rule was a period marked by the ravages of warfare.

A part of the region south of the Peene river (Old Western Pomerania) came under Prussian sovereignty after the Stockholm peace treaty in 1720. Under the Treaty of Kiel, the remnants of Swedish Pomerania (New Western Pomerania) were briefly transferred to Denmark in 1814, but the 1815 Congress of Vienna ceded the territory to Prussia.

From 1815, all of Western Pomerania was integrated into the Prussian Province of Pomerania, administered as the Region of Stralsund (New Western Pomerania) and Region of Stettin (the old Western Pomeranian region). Stralsund was fused into Stettin in 1932.

From May to September 1939, before and during the German invasion of Poland, which started World War II, Polish people in the region, particularly in Szczecin, were targeted by Nazi repressions, with Polish organizations attacked and Polish leaders, activists, entrepreneurs, and even some staff of the Consulate of Poland, arrested by the Gestapo. During the war, Germany operated the Stalag II-C, Stalag 322, Stalag Luft I and Stalag Luft II prisoner-of-war camps for British, American, French, Belgian, Serbian and Soviet POWs with numerous forced labour subcamps in the region. The Polish resistance movement was active in Szczecin, Police and Peenemünde and conducted espionage of the Kriegsmarine, infiltrated the local German industry, distributed Polish underground press, and facilitated escapes of Polish and British POWs who fled from German POW camps via the port of Szczecin to neutral Sweden (see also: Poland–Sweden relations).

In the final stages of the war, in 1945, German-perpetrated death marches of Allied POWs from Stalag XX-B and Stalag Luft IV passed through the region.

=== Postwar period 1945-1990 ===
At the end of World War II in 1945, a small area of Hither Pomerania including Szczecin – the region's principal city – and Świnoujście was transferred along with Farther Pomerania to Poland, and formed part of the Szczecin Voivodeship.

The bulk of Vorpommern became part of the newly constituted Land (state) of Mecklenburg-Vorpommern. The word "Vorpommern" was deleted from the state's name at the insistence of the Soviet military administration in 1947 and the entire state of Mecklenburg was abolished by East Germany (German Democratic Republic, GDR) in 1952. The Pomeranian districts were made part of the GDR's Bezirk Rostock (coastal region) and Bezirk Neubrandenburg, with a small area around Gartz becoming part of Bezirk Frankfurt/Oder.

=== Contemporary: Mecklenburg-Vorpommern, Brandenburg and West Pomeranian Voivodeship ===
The 1945–1952 state was reconstituted, with minor border adjustments, as Mecklenburg-Vorpommern at the time of German reunification in 1990. Vorpommern is a constitutional region of the state, yet not an administrative entity.

After the administrative reforms of September 2011, the bulk of Western Pomerania is within the districts of Vorpommern-Rügen and Vorpommern-Greifswald; however, some west central areas including Demmin and Altentreptow are within Mecklenburgische Seenplatte district, while the southernmost fragment (Amt Gartz (Oder)) remains part of the Uckermark district within Brandenburg. In 2012, the Pomeranian Evangelical Church merged with the Mecklenburgian and Northalbingian Evangelical Churches.

Since the administrative reform of 1999, the Polish part is located within the West Pomeranian Voivodeship and encompasses the cities with powiat rights Szczecin and Świnoujście, the Police County, the part of Kamień County located on the island of Wolin (Gmina Międzyzdroje, western part of Gmina Wolin including the town, and western part of Gmina Dziwnów), as well as Gmina Goleniów in Goleniów County.

== See also ==
- List of towns in Western Pomerania
- List of Pomeranian duchies and dukes
- West Pomeranian dialect
