= Siadło =

Siadło may refer to the following places in Police County, West Pomeranian Voivodeship, Poland:

- Siadło Dolne
- Siadło Górne
