= Smętowice =

- Village
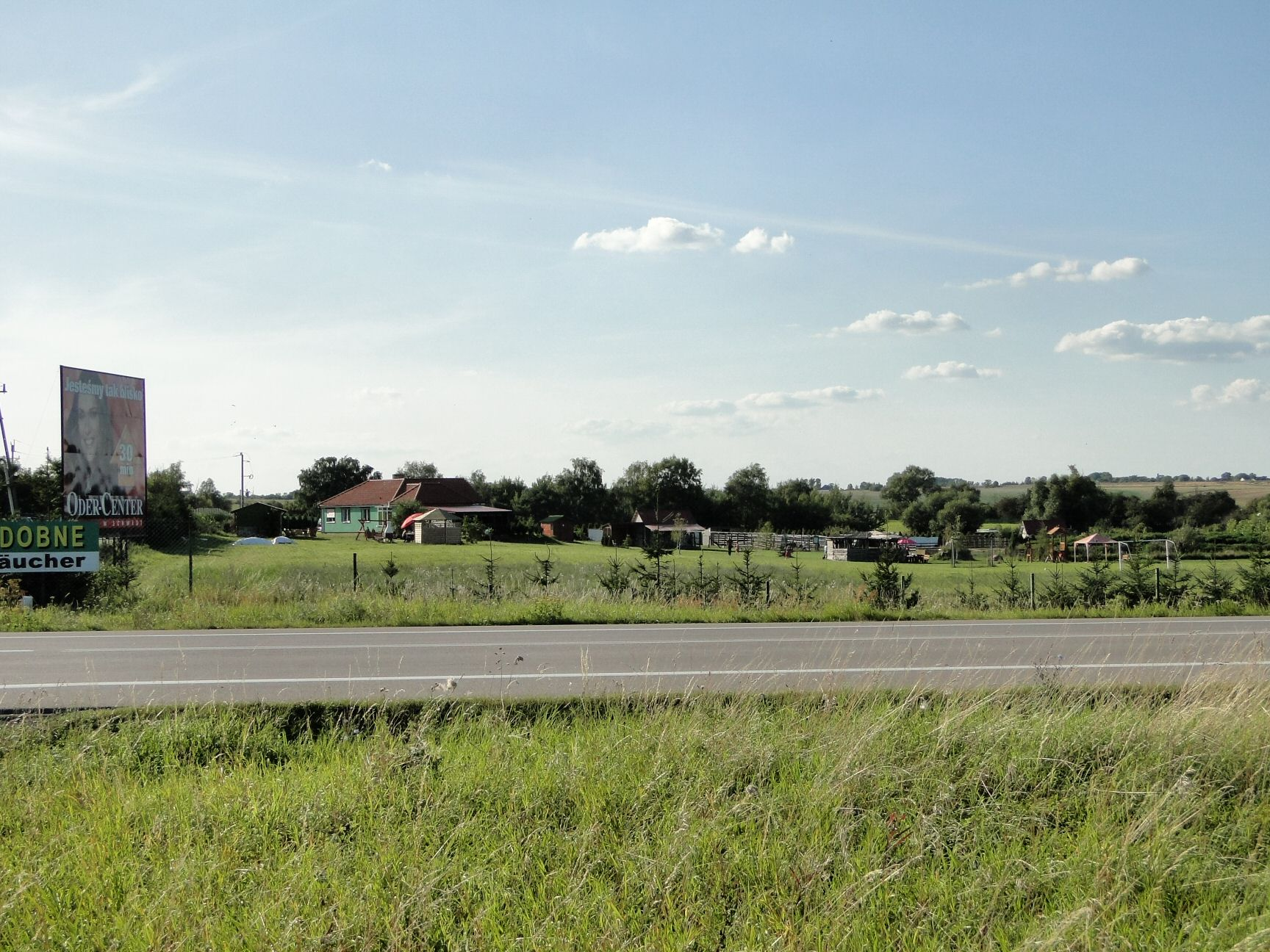

- Location within Poland
- Coordinates: 53°21′17″N 14°27′30″E
- Country: Poland
- Voivodeship: West Pomeranian
- County: Police
- Gmina: Kołbaskowo
- Time zone: UTC+1 (CET)
  - Summer (DST): UTC+2 (CEST)
- Vehicle registration: ZPL
- Primary airport: Solidarity Szczecin–Goleniów Airport

Smętowice [smɛntɔˈvit͡sɛ] (German: Marienhof) is a village in the administrative district of Gmina Kołbaskowo, within Police County, West Pomeranian Voivodeship, in north-western Poland, close to the German border. It lies approximately 22 km (14 mi) south of Police and 11 km (7 mi) south-west of the regional capital Szczecin.

The National road 13, which connects Szczecin with the Polish-German border at Rosówek, runs through the village.

Since the Middle Ages the area was part of Poland and the Duchy of Pomerania following Poland's fragmentation, Sweden, Prussia and Germany, before it became part of Poland again following the defeat of Nazi Germany in World War II in 1945.
