= Gmina Kołbaskowo =

Gmina Kołbaskowo Kołbaskowo Commune
- Gmina
- Flag Coat of arms
- Interactive map of Gmina Kołbaskowo
- Coordinates (Kołbaskowo): 53°20′9″N 14°26′18″E
- Country: Poland
- Voivodeship: West Pomeranian
- County: Police
- Seat: Kołbaskowo

Area
  - Total: 105.40 km^{2} (40.70 sq mi)

Population (2006)
  - Total: 8,835
  - Density: 83.82/km^{2} (217.1/sq mi)
- Website: http://www.kolbaskowo.pl/

Gmina Kołbaskowo is a rural gmina (administrative district) in Police County, West Pomeranian Voivodeship, in north-western Poland, on the German border. Its seat is the village of Kołbaskowo, which lies approximately 24 kilometres (15 mi) south of Police and 14 km (9 mi) south-west of the regional capital Szczecin.

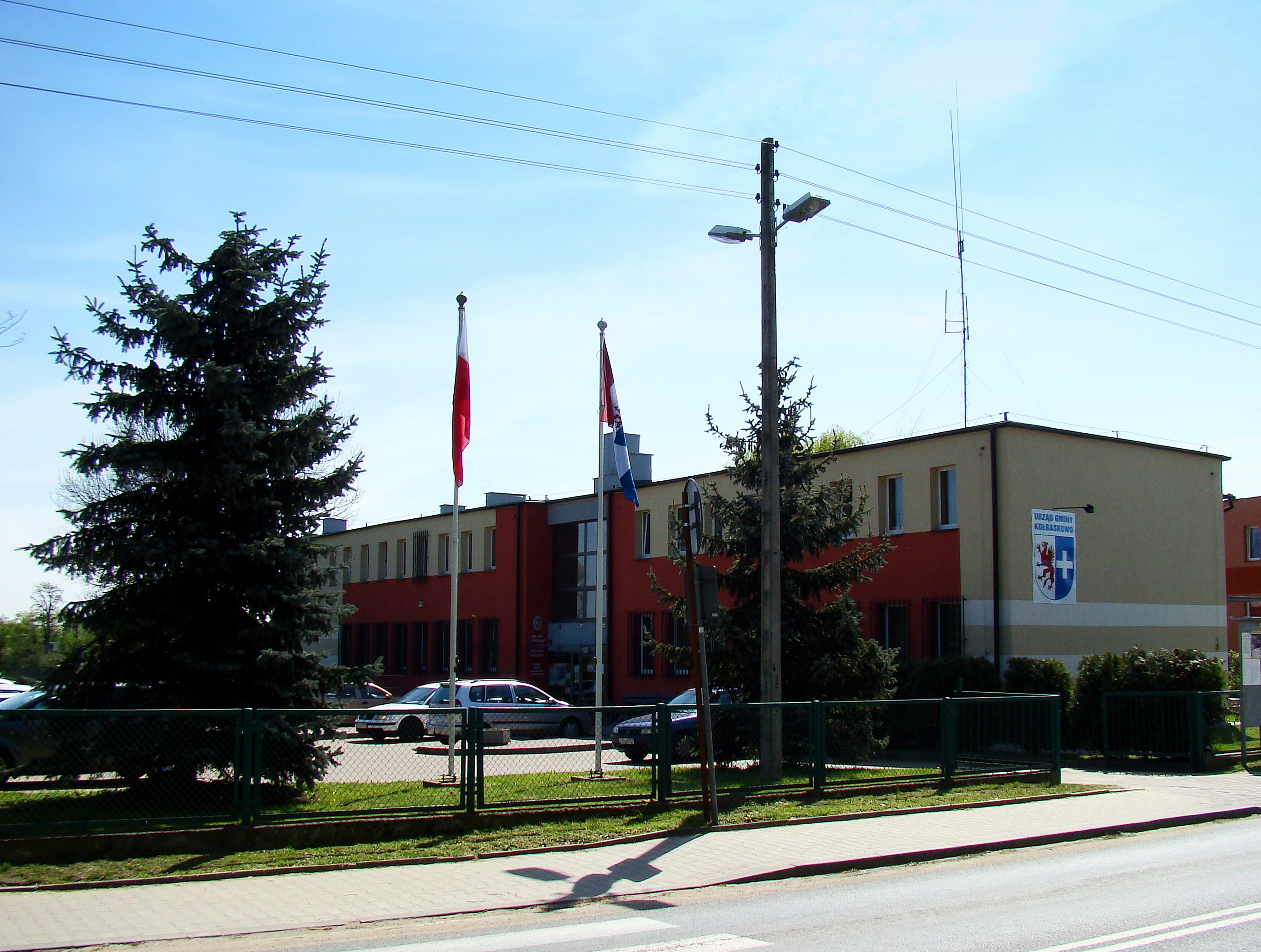

The gmina covers an area of 105.40 square kilometres (40.7 sq mi), and as of 2006 its total population is 8,835.

The gmina contains part of the protected area called Lower Odra Valley Landscape Park.

== Villages ==
Gmina Kołbaskowo contains the villages and settlements of Barnisław, Będargowo, Bobolin, Kamieniec, Kamionki, Karwowo, Kołbaskowo, Kurów, Moczyły, Ostoja, Pargowo, Przecław, Przylep, Rajkowo, Rosówek, Siadło Dolne, Siadło Górne, Smętowice, Smolęcin, Stobno, Ustowo, Warnik and Warzymice.

== Neighbouring gminas ==
Gmina Kołbaskowo is bordered by the city of Szczecin and by the gminas of Dobra and Gryfino. It also borders Germany.
