= Rajkowo =

- Village
- Location within Poland
- Coordinates: 53°23′N 14°29′E
- Country: Poland
- Voivodeship: West Pomeranian
- County: Police
- Gmina: Kołbaskowo
- Population: 190
- Website: rajkowo.glt.pl

Rajkowo [rai̯ˈkɔvɔ] (German: Reinkendorf) is a village in the administrative district of Gmina Kołbaskowo, within Police County, West Pomeranian Voivodeship, in north-western Poland, close to the German border. It lies approximately 18 km (11 mi) south of Police and 8 km (5 mi) south-west of the regional capital Szczecin.

For the history of the region, see History of Pomerania.

The village has a population of 190.
