= Warnik =

- Village
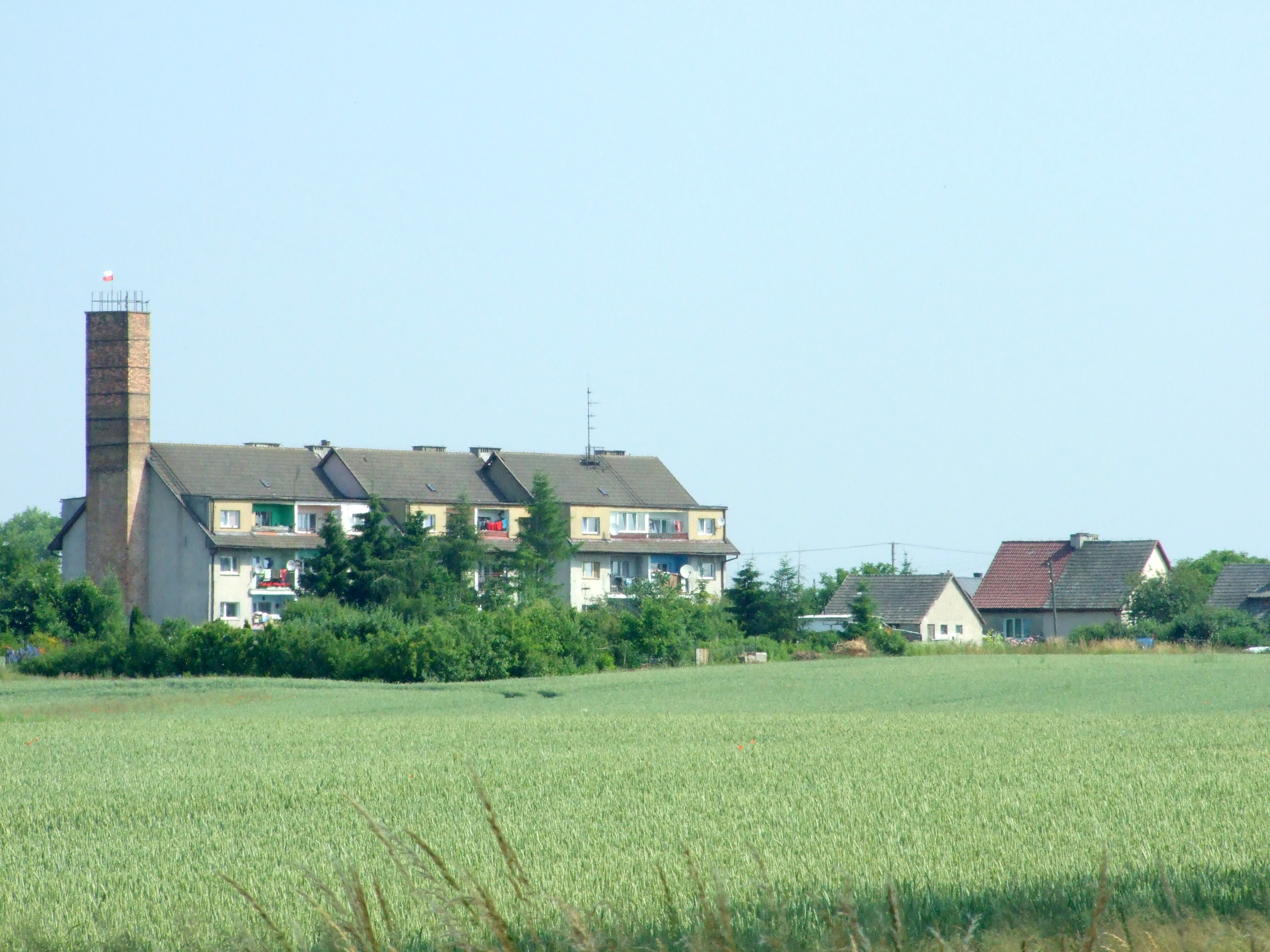

- Location within Poland
- Coordinates: 53°22′55″N 14°24′17″E
- Country: Poland
- Voivodeship: West Pomeranian
- County: Police
- Gmina: Kołbaskowo

Warnik [ˈvarnik] (German: Warningshof) is a village in the administrative district of Gmina Kołbaskowo, within Police County, West Pomeranian Voivodeship, in north-western Poland, close to the German border.
