= Kamionki, West Pomeranian Voivodeship =

Kamionki
- Village
- Location within Poland
- Coordinates: 53°18′38″N 14°27′44″E
- Country: Poland
- Voivodeship: West Pomeranian
- County: Police
- Gmina: Kołbaskowo

Kamionki [kaˈmjɔnki] (German: Unter Schöningen) is a village in the administrative district of Gmina Kołbaskowo, within Police County, West Pomeranian Voivodeship, in north-western Poland, close to the German border. It lies approximately 26 km (16 mi) south of Police and 15 km (9 mi) south-west of the regional capital Szczecin.

For the history of the region, see History of Pomerania.
