= Moczyły =

- Village
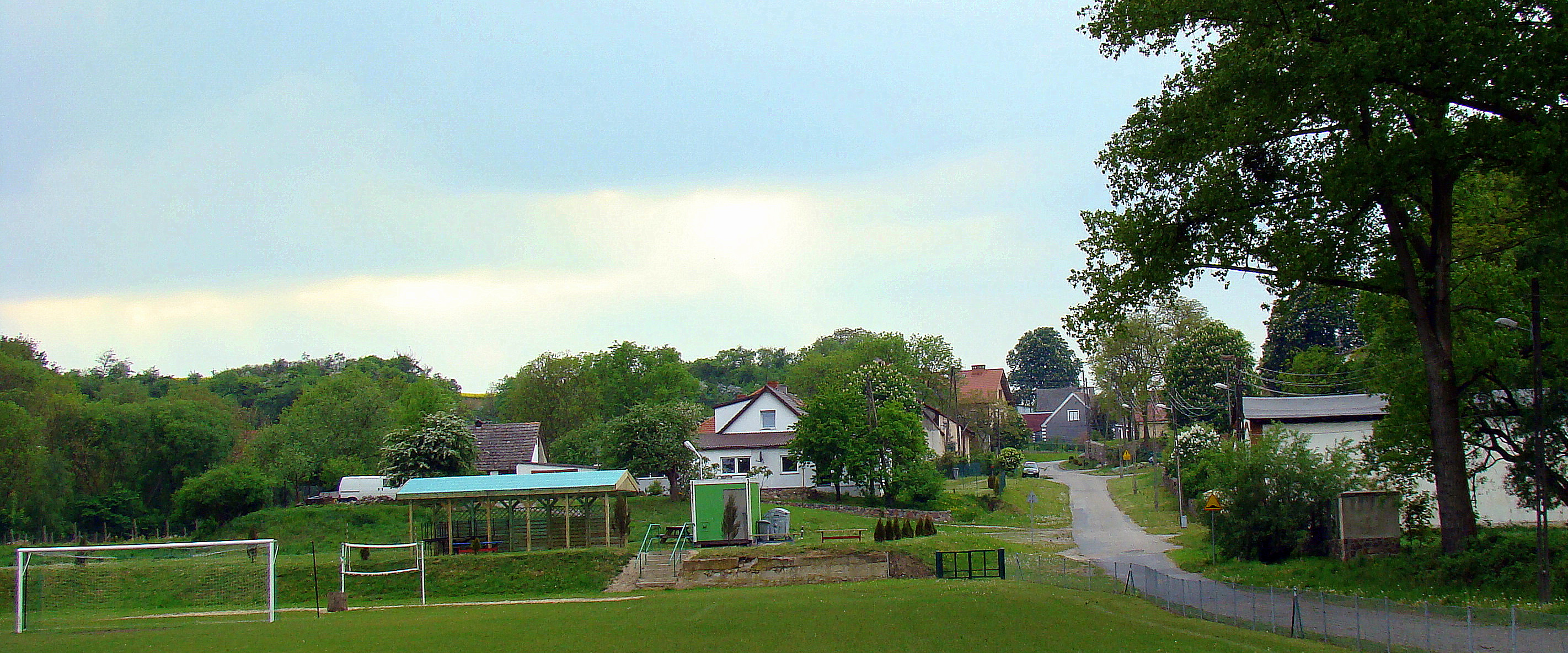
- Moczyły

- Location within Poland
- Coordinates: 53°19′23″N 14°28′0″E
- Country: Poland
- Voivodeship: West Pomeranian
- County: Police
- Gmina: Kołbaskowo

Moczyły [mɔˈt͡ʂɨwɨ] (German: Schillersdorf) is a village in the administrative district of Gmina Kołbaskowo, within Police County, West Pomeranian Voivodeship, in north-western Poland, close to the German border. It lies approximately 25 km (16 mi) south of Police and 13 km (8 mi) south-west of the regional capital Szczecin.

For the history of the region, see History of Pomerania.
