= Kurów, West Pomeranian Voivodeship =

Kurów
- Village
- Location within Poland
- Coordinates: 53°21′45″N 14°30′0″E
- Country: Poland
- Voivodeship: West Pomeranian
- County: Police
- Gmina: Kołbaskowo

Kurów [ˈkuruf] (German: Kurow) is a village in the administrative district of Gmina Kołbaskowo, within Police County, West Pomeranian Voivodeship, in north-western Poland, close to the German border. It lies approximately 20 km (12 mi) south of Police and 9 km (6 mi) south-west of the regional capital Szczecin.

For the history of the region, see History of Pomerania.
