= Przecław, West Pomeranian Voivodeship =

Przecław
- Village
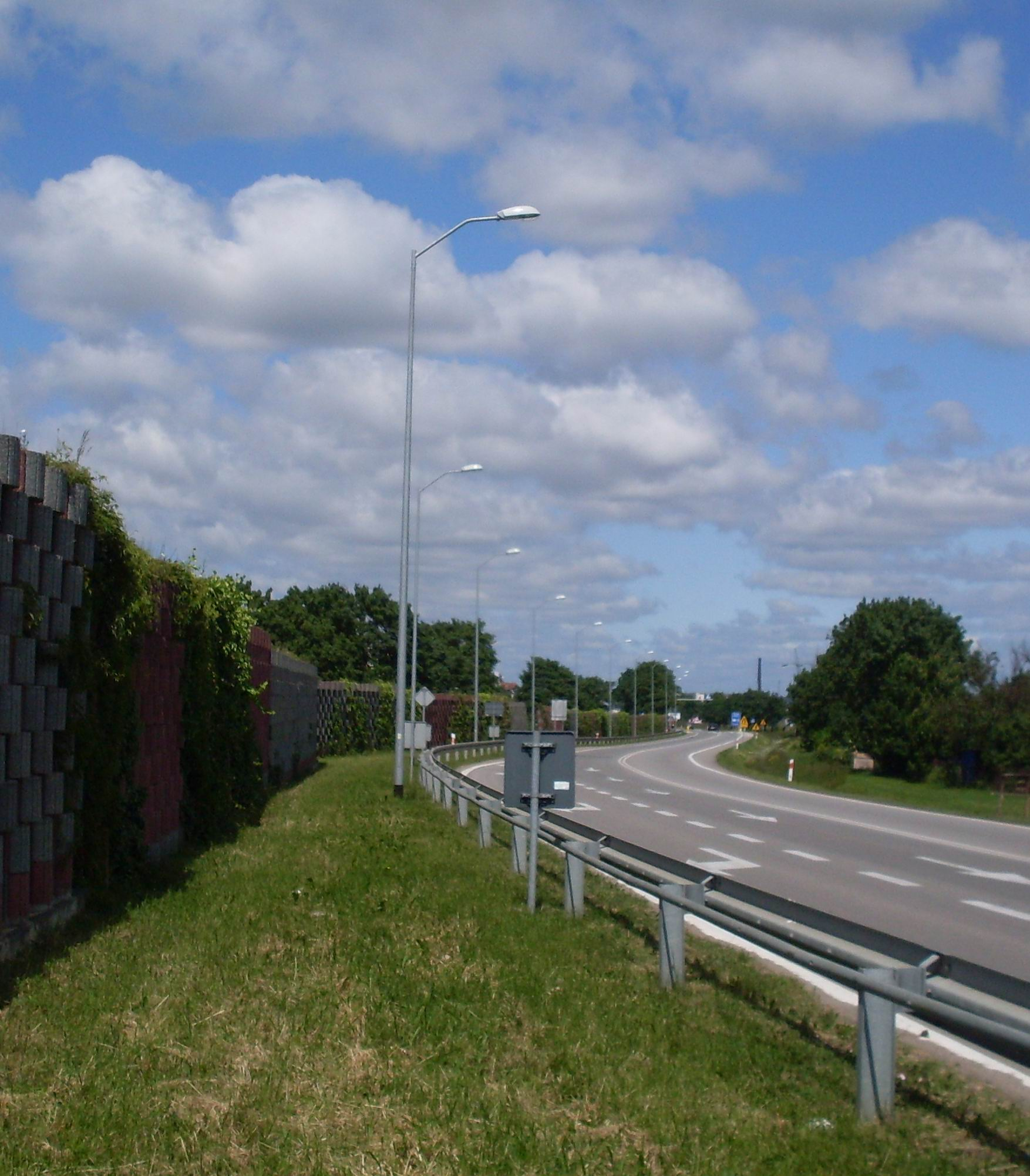
- National road 13 in Przecław

- Location within Poland
- Coordinates: 53°22′34″N 14°28′20″E
- Country: Poland
- Voivodeship: West Pomeranian
- County: Police
- Gmina: Kołbaskowo
- Population: 4,100
- Time zone: UTC+1 (CET)
  - Summer (DST): UTC+2 (CEST)
- Vehicle registration: ZPL
- Primary airport: Solidarity Szczecin–Goleniów Airport

Przecław [ˈpʂɛt͡swaf] (German: Pritzlow) is a village in the administrative district of Gmina Kołbaskowo, within Police County, West Pomeranian Voivodeship, in north-western Poland, close to the German border. It lies approximately 19 km (12 mi) south of Police and 9 km (6 mi) south-west of the regional capital Szczecin.

The village has a population of 4,100.

== History ==
The name of the village comes from castellan Przecław, who settled at the site when first historic Polish ruler Mieszko I included the region within the emerging Polish state in the 10th century. The settlement was part of Poland, and then it was also part of the Duchy of Pomerania following Poland's fragmentation, Sweden, Prussia and Germany, before it became part of Poland again following the defeat of Nazi Germany in World War II in 1945.

== Transport ==
The National road 13, which connects Szczecin with the Polish-German border at Rosówek, runs through the village.

== Religion ==
There is a Catholic parish and church of the Visitation of Mary in Przecław.
