= Kamieniec, West Pomeranian Voivodeship =

Kamieniec
- Village
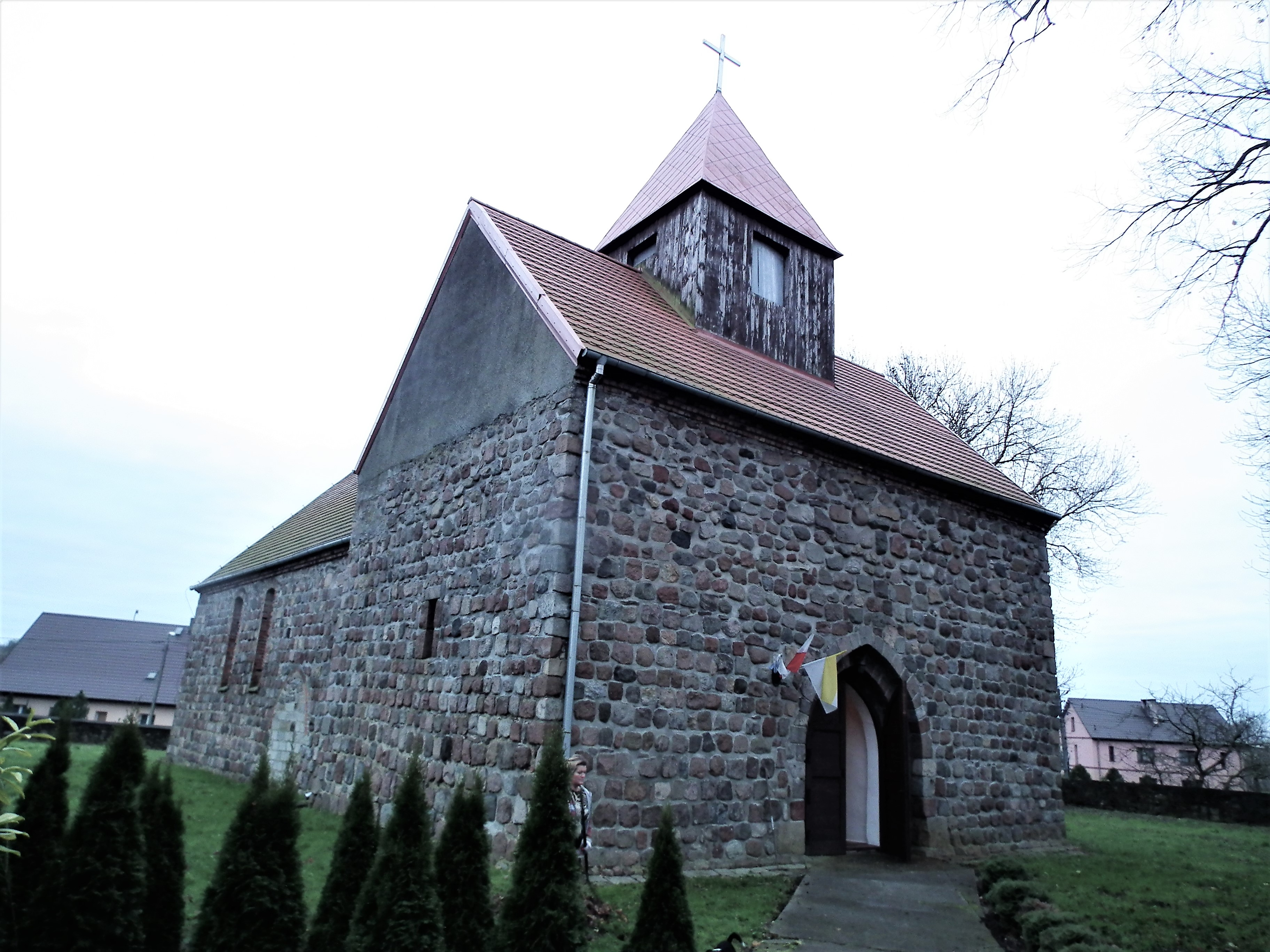
- Church of Corpus Christi

- Location within Poland
- Coordinates: 53°18′N 14°26′E
- Country: Poland
- Voivodeship: West Pomeranian
- County: Police
- Gmina: Kołbaskowo

Population
  - Total: 300

Kamieniec [kaˈmjɛɲɛt͡s] (German: Schöningen) is a village in the administrative district of Gmina Kołbaskowo, within Police County, West Pomeranian Voivodeship, in north-western Poland, close to the German border. It lies approximately 28 km (17 mi) south of Police and 17 km (11 mi) south-west of the regional capital Szczecin.

For the history of the region, see History of Pomerania.

The village has a population of 300.

== People ==
- Hans Schlange-Schöningen (1886-1960), German politician, farmer and landowner
