= Przylep, West Pomeranian Voivodeship =

Przylep
- Village
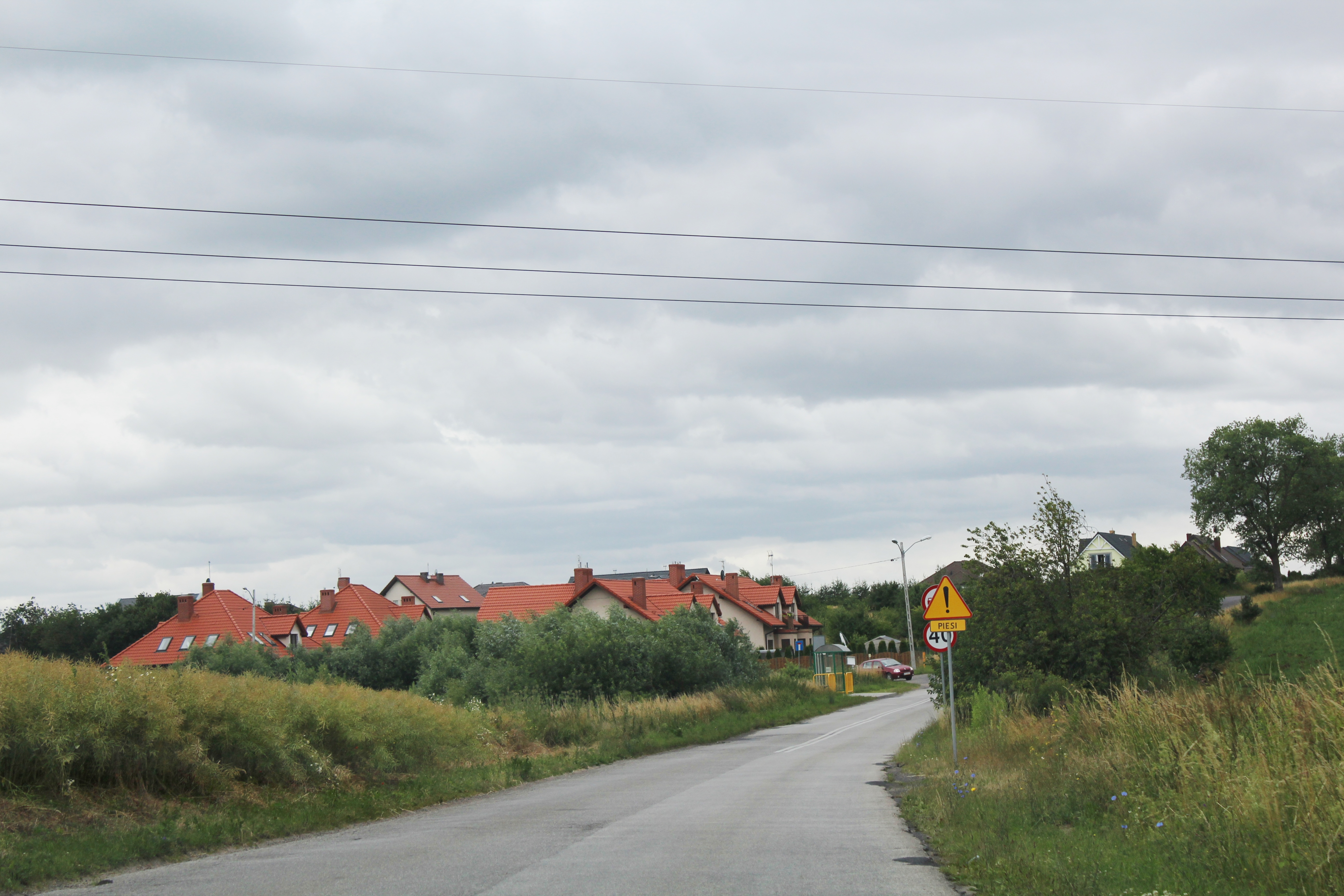

- Location within Poland
- Coordinates: 53°24′42″N 14°27′24″E
- Country: Poland
- Voivodeship: West Pomeranian
- County: Police
- Gmina: Kołbaskowo

Przylep [ˈpʂɨlɛp] (German: Prilipp) is a village in the administrative district of Gmina Kołbaskowo, within Police County, West Pomeranian Voivodeship, in north-western Poland, close to the German border.

For the history of the region, see History of Pomerania.
