= Ostoja, West Pomeranian Voivodeship =

Ostoja
- Village
- Location within Poland
- Coordinates: 53°24′25″N 14°28′18″E
- Country: Poland
- Voivodeship: West Pomeranian
- County: Police
- Gmina: Kołbaskowo

Ostoja [ɔsˈtɔja] (German: Schadeleben) is a village in the administrative district of Gmina Kołbaskowo, within Police County, West Pomeranian Voivodeship, in north-western Poland, close to the German border. It lies approximately 16 km (10 mi) south-west of Police and 8 km (5 mi) west of the regional capital Szczecin.

For the history of the region, see History of Pomerania.
