= Będargowo, Police County =

Będargowo
- Village
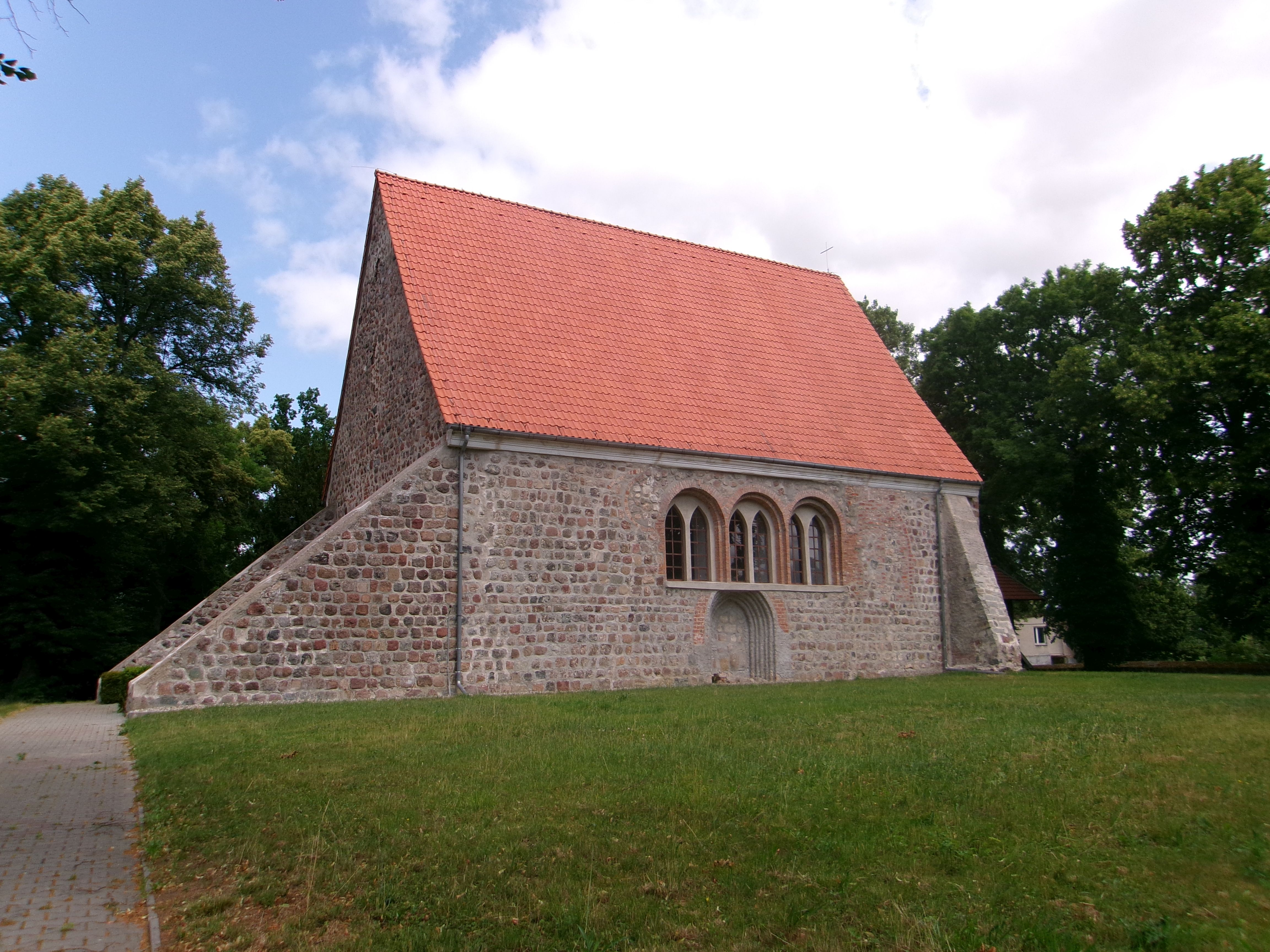
- Our Lady Help of Christians church in Będargowo

- Location within Poland
- Coordinates: 53°23′N 14°26′E
- Country: Poland
- Voivodeship: West Pomeranian
- County: Police
- Gmina: Kołbaskowo

Population
  - Total: 220
- Time zone: UTC+1 (CET)
  - Summer (DST): UTC+2 (CEST)
- Vehicle registration: ZPL

Będargowo [bɛndarˈɡɔvɔ] is a village in the administrative district of Gmina Kołbaskowo, within Police County, West Pomeranian Voivodeship, in north-western Poland, close to the German border. It lies approximately 19 km (12 mi) south-west of Police and 11 km (7 mi) west of the regional capital Szczecin.

== History ==
During World War II, on 8 February 1945, the village was the site of a stopover during the German-organised march of some 6,000 Polish prisoners of war from the Oflag II-D camp headed westwards.
