= Bobolin, Police County =

Bobolin
- Village
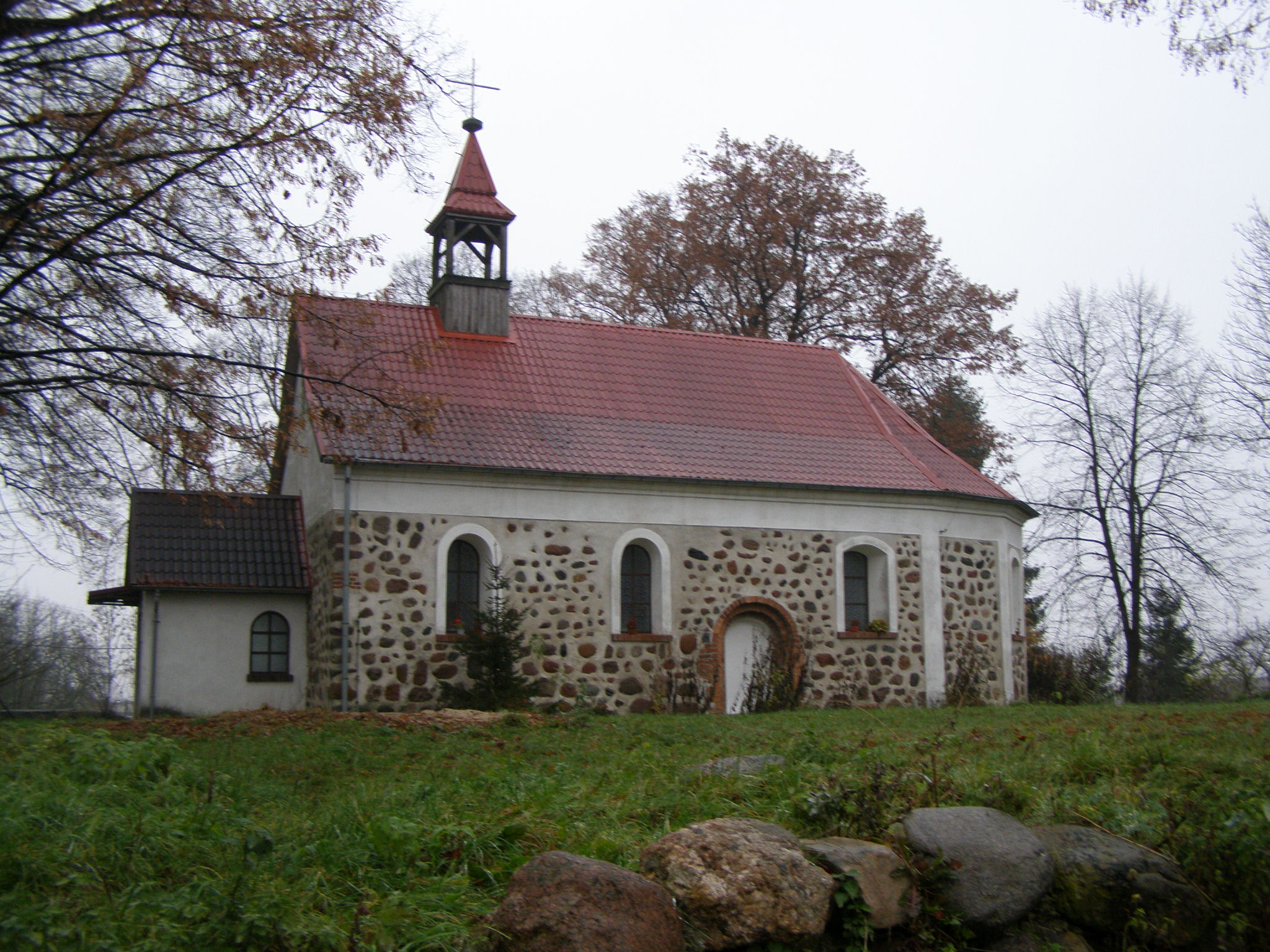
- Church

- Location within Poland
- Coordinates: 53°23′40″N 14°23′30″E
- Country: Poland
- Voivodeship: West Pomeranian
- County: Police
- Gmina: Kołbaskowo

Bobolin [bɔˈbɔlin] (German: Boblin) is a village in the administrative district of Gmina Kołbaskowo, within Police County, West Pomeranian Voivodeship, in north-western Poland, close to the German border. It lies approximately 20 km (12 mi) south-west of Police and 13 km (8 mi) west of the regional capital Szczecin.

For the history of the region, see History of Pomerania.

== Notable residents ==
- Meinhard Nehmer (born 1941), athlete
