= Barnisław, West Pomeranian Voivodeship =

Barnisław
- Village
- Location within Poland
- Coordinates: 53°22′N 14°19′E
- Country: Poland
- Voivodeship: West Pomeranian
- County: Police
- Gmina: Kołbaskowo

Barnisław [barˈniswaf] (German: Barnimslow) is a village in the administrative district of Gmina Kołbaskowo, within Police County, West Pomeranian Voivodeship, in north-western Poland, close to the German border. It lies approximately 25 km (16 mi) south-west of Police and 19 km (12 mi) west of the regional capital Szczecin.

== See also ==
- History of Pomerania
