= Siadło Dolne =

- Village
- Location within Poland
- Coordinates: 53°20′56″N 14°30′0″E
- Country: Poland
- Voivodeship: West Pomeranian
- County: Police
- Gmina: Kołbaskowo

Siadło Dolne [ˈɕadwɔ ˈdɔlnɛ] (formerly German: Niederzahden) is a village in the administrative district of Gmina Kołbaskowo, within Police County, West Pomeranian Voivodeship, in north-western Poland, close to the German border. It lies approximately 21 km (13 mi) south of Police and 10 km (6 mi) south-west of the regional capital Szczecin.

For the history of the region, see History of Pomerania.
