= Pargowo =

Polish Village

- Village
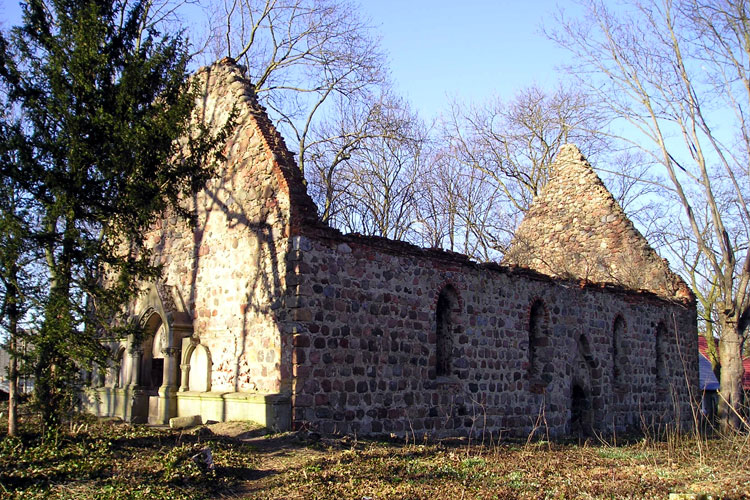
- Ruins of the church from 14th century

- Location within Poland
- Coordinates: 53°17′N 14°26′E
- Country: Poland
- Voivodeship: West Pomeranian
- County: Police
- Gmina: Kołbaskowo

Pargowo [parˈɡɔvɔ] (German: Pargow) is a village in the administrative district of Gmina Kołbaskowo, within Police County, West Pomeranian Voivodeship, in north-western Poland, close to the German border. It lies approximately 30 km (19 mi) south of Police and 18 km (11 mi) south-west of the regional capital Szczecin.

For the history of the region, see History of Pomerania.
