= Siadło Górne =

- Village
- Location within Poland
- Coordinates: 53°21′1″N 14°28′29″E
- Country: Poland
- Voivodeship: West Pomeranian
- County: Police
- Gmina: Kołbaskowo

Siadło Górne [ˈɕadwɔ ˈɡurnɛ] (German: Hohenzahden) is a village in the administrative district of Gmina Kołbaskowo, within Police County, West Pomeranian Voivodeship, in north-western Poland, close to the German border. It lies approximately 22 km (14 mi) south of Police and 11 km (7 mi) south-west of the regional capital Szczecin.

For the history of the region, see History of Pomerania.
