= Stobno, West Pomeranian Voivodeship =

Stobno
- Village
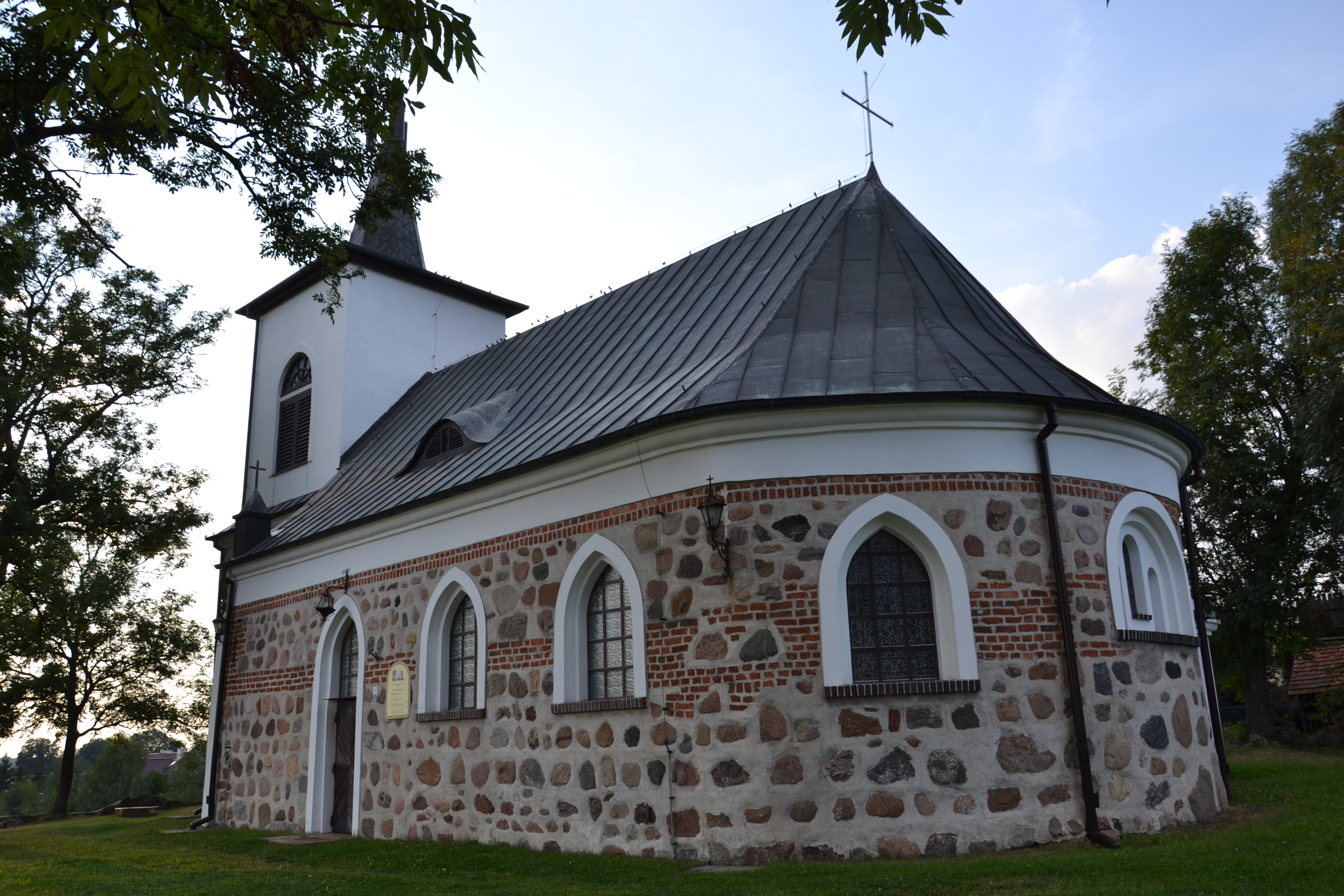
- Our Lady of Fatima church in Stobno

- Location within Poland
- Coordinates: 53°24′49″N 14°25′49″E
- Country: Poland
- Voivodeship: West Pomeranian
- County: Police
- Gmina: Kołbaskowo
- Population: 450
- Time zone: UTC+1 (CET)
  - Summer (DST): UTC+2 (CEST)
- Vehicle registration: ZPL

Stobno [ˈstɔbnɔ] (German: Stöven) is a village in the administrative district of Gmina Kołbaskowo, within Police County, West Pomeranian Voivodeship, in north-western Poland, close to the German border. It lies approximately 17 km (11 mi) south-west of Police and 11 km (7 mi) west of the regional capital Szczecin.

The village has a population of 450.

== History ==
The village dates back to the Middle Ages. The territory became part of the Duchy of Poland in the 10th century under Mieszko I of the Piast dynasty, and following the fragmentation of Poland it formed part of the Duchy of Pomerania. The village was first mentioned in documents in 1243, when Barnim I, Duke of Pomerania granted it to a nunnery from nearby Szczecin. From 1871 to 1945 it was part of Germany, and following Germany's defeat in World War II it became again part of Poland.
