= Warzymice =

- Village
- Location within Poland
- Coordinates: 53°22′55″N 14°27′38″E
- Country: Poland
- Voivodeship: West Pomeranian
- County: Police
- Gmina: Kołbaskowo
- Population: 2,000
- Website: http://www.warzymice.net

Warzymice [vaʐɨˈmit͡sɛ] (German Reinkendorf) is a village in the administrative district of Gmina Kołbaskowo, within Police County, West Pomeranian Voivodeship, in north-western Poland, close to the German border. It lies approximately 19 km (12 mi) south-west of Police and borders with the regional capital Szczecin (7 km (4 mi) away from city-centre).
