= Rosówek =

- Village
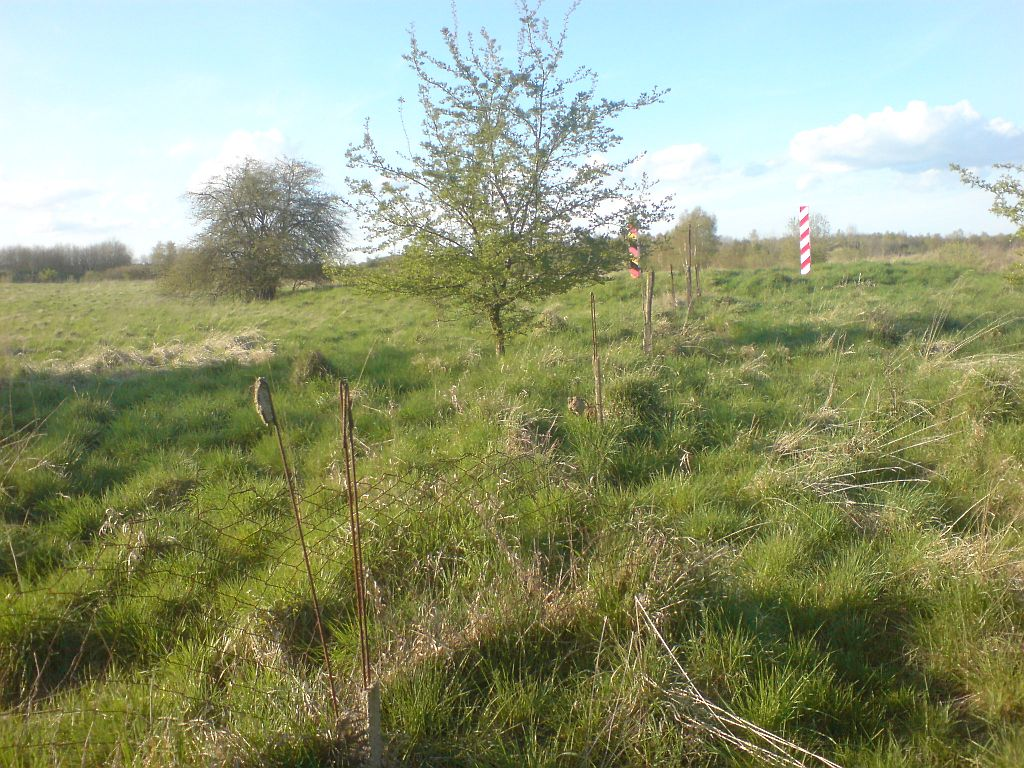
- Destroyed fence running exactly on the border line between Poland and Germany, near Rosówek

- Location within Poland
- Coordinates: 53°19′23″N 14°25′22″E
- Country: Poland
- Voivodeship: West Pomeranian
- County: Police
- Gmina: Kołbaskowo
- Established: 1821–1822
- Time zone: UTC+1 (CET)
  - Summer (DST): UTC+2 (CEST)
- Vehicle registration: ZPL
- Primary airport: Solidarity Szczecin–Goleniów Airport

Rosówek [rɔˈsuvɛk] (formerly German: Neu Rosow) is a village in the administrative district of Gmina Kołbaskowo, within Police County, West Pomeranian Voivodeship, in north-western Poland, close to the German border. It lies approximately 26 km (16 mi) south of Police and 15 km (9 mi) south-west of the regional capital Szczecin.

There was a border crossing for Rosówek-Rosow passenger cars near the village, which was liquidated after Poland joined the European Union. The buildings of the former border crossing are the seat of the mobile unit of the Polish Border Guard. There is a currency exchange office, an insurance house and several shops in the village. Rosówek has a permanent bus connection with Szczecin. There is also a motocross track in the village, where competitions of high rank are regularly held, including in the Grand Prix cycle.

== History ==
Since the Middle Ages the area was part of Poland and the Duchy of Pomerania following Poland's fragmentation, Sweden, Prussia and Germany, before it became part of Poland again following the defeat of Nazi Germany in World War II in 1945. In the areas where the settlement is located, even before its establishment, in 1630, during the Thirty Years' War, the Swedish king Gustav II Adolf was wounded and then taken into Imperial captivity, from where he was recaptured by the Swedish army. The settlement, known under the German name of Neu Rosow, was established in 1821-22 as a part of Rosow. It gained significance only at the end of World War II. After crossing the Oder River, the passing front did not spare Rosówek, which became the site of the bloody battle for Szczecin. The surrounding areas were also affected by the first post-war correction of the western border of Poland and the defining of the Oder–Neisse line as the new German-Polish border. Over the following years, Rosówek was seen mainly through the prism of the border crossing.
