= Enchanted April =

Enchanted April may refer to:

- The Enchanted April, the 1922 novel by Elizabeth von Arnim
- Enchanted April (1935 film)
- Enchanted April (1991 film)
- Enchanted April (2003 play) Tony-nominated Broadway production
- a 2010 musical stage adaptation by Charles Leipart and Richard Bunger Evans
