= Divo Martino, Portofino =

Church building in Italy

Divo Martino
- Chiesa del Divo Martino (Italian)
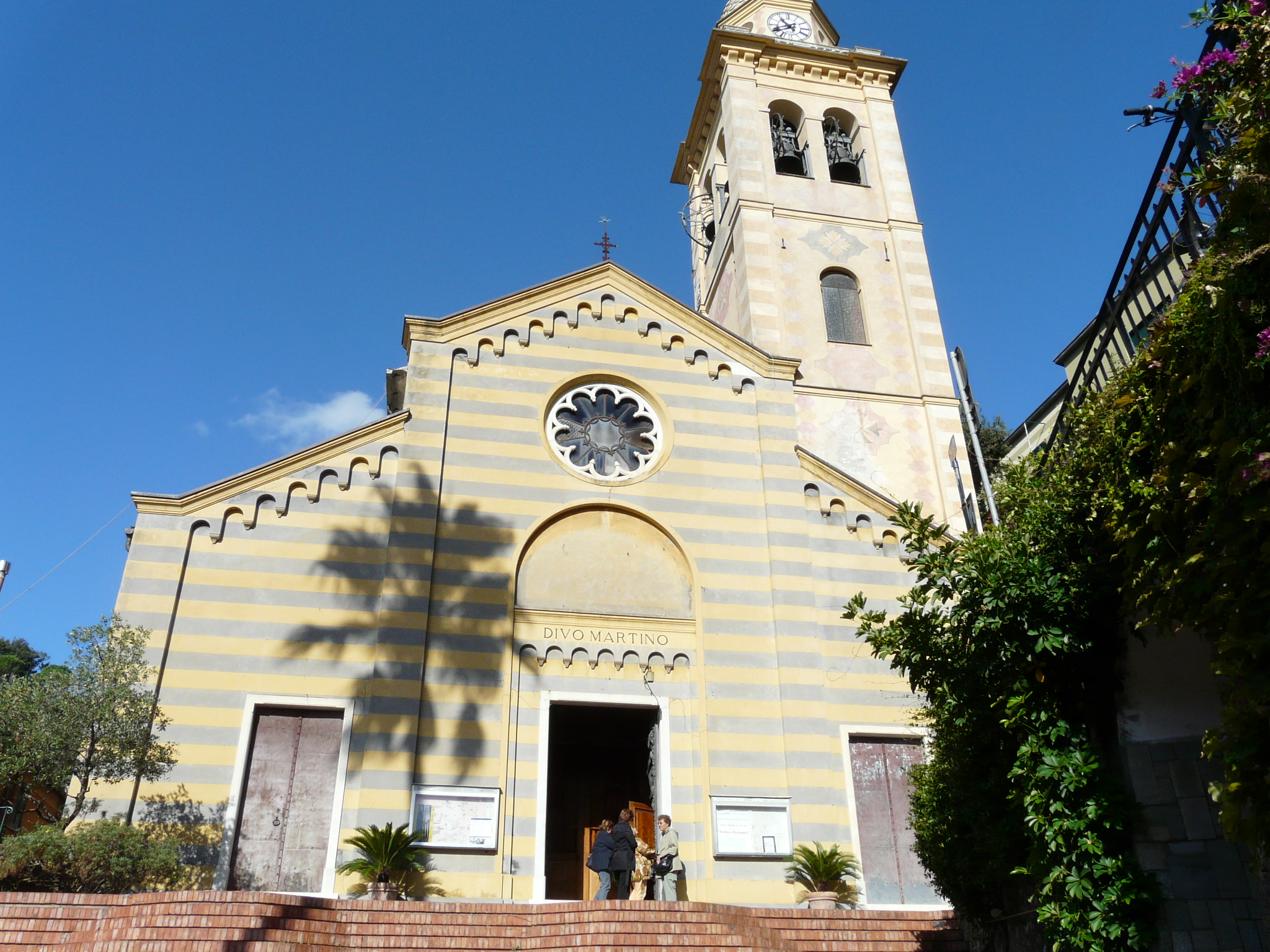
- Divo Martino, Portofino in 2008
- Click on the map for a fullscreen view
- 44°18′13.82″N 9°12′33.9″E
- Country: Italy
- Denomination: Roman Catholic

Architecture
- Functional status: Active

Administration
- Diocese: Diocese of Chiavari

Divo Martino is a Roman Catholic church located in Portofino, Italy.

== History ==
The first construction of the church, dedicated to Martin of Tours, dates back to 986, when it replaced an early chapel located near the quay. Originally, the church featured a Lombard Romanesque style, similar to the neighbouring San Giorgio in Portofino. Over the course of its history, the building underwent numerous modifications that altered its appearance; its current look is the result of works carried out at the end of the 19th century.

== Description ==
The church features a three-nave plan. The façade incorporates a rose window.

Inside, there are several paintings and sculptures, including a wooden sculpture depicting the Deposition of Christ by the Genoese sculptor Anton Maria Maragliano.

== Gallery ==
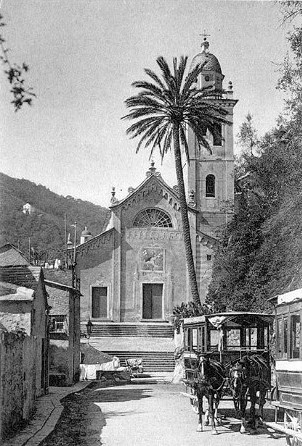

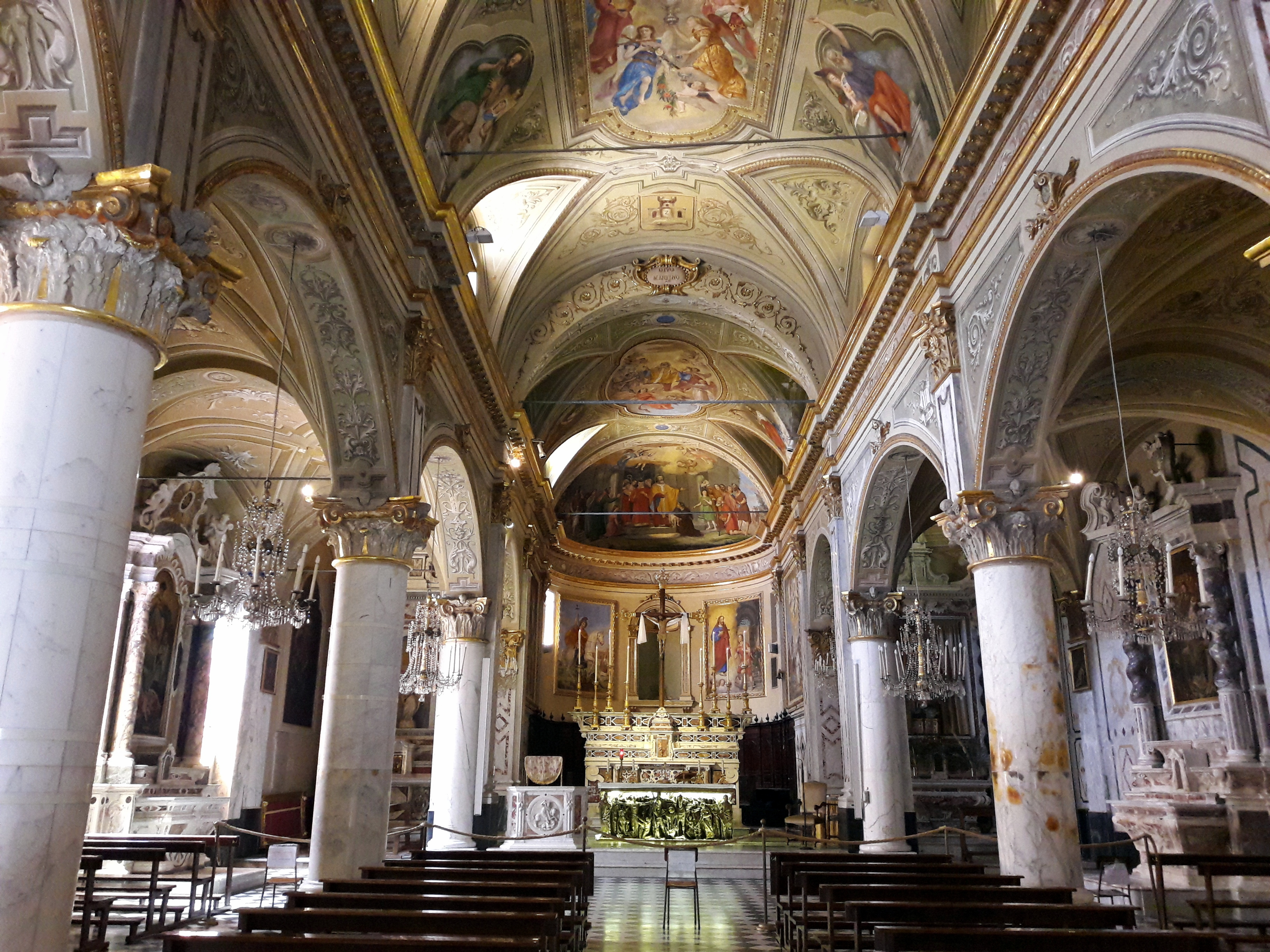

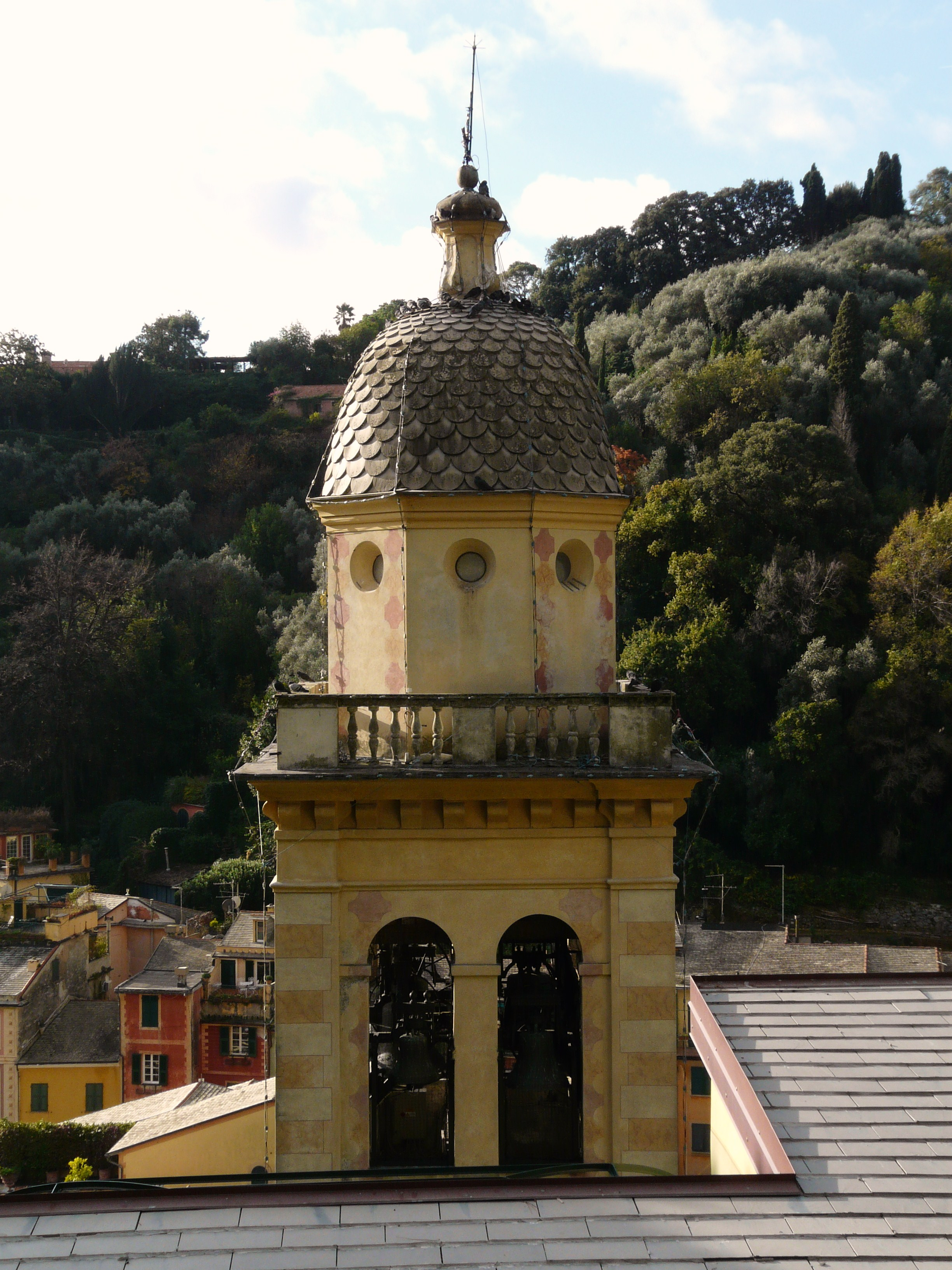
