= San Fruttuoso Abbey =

Romanesque abbey near Genoa, Italy

Coordinates: 44.3164°N 9.1752°E

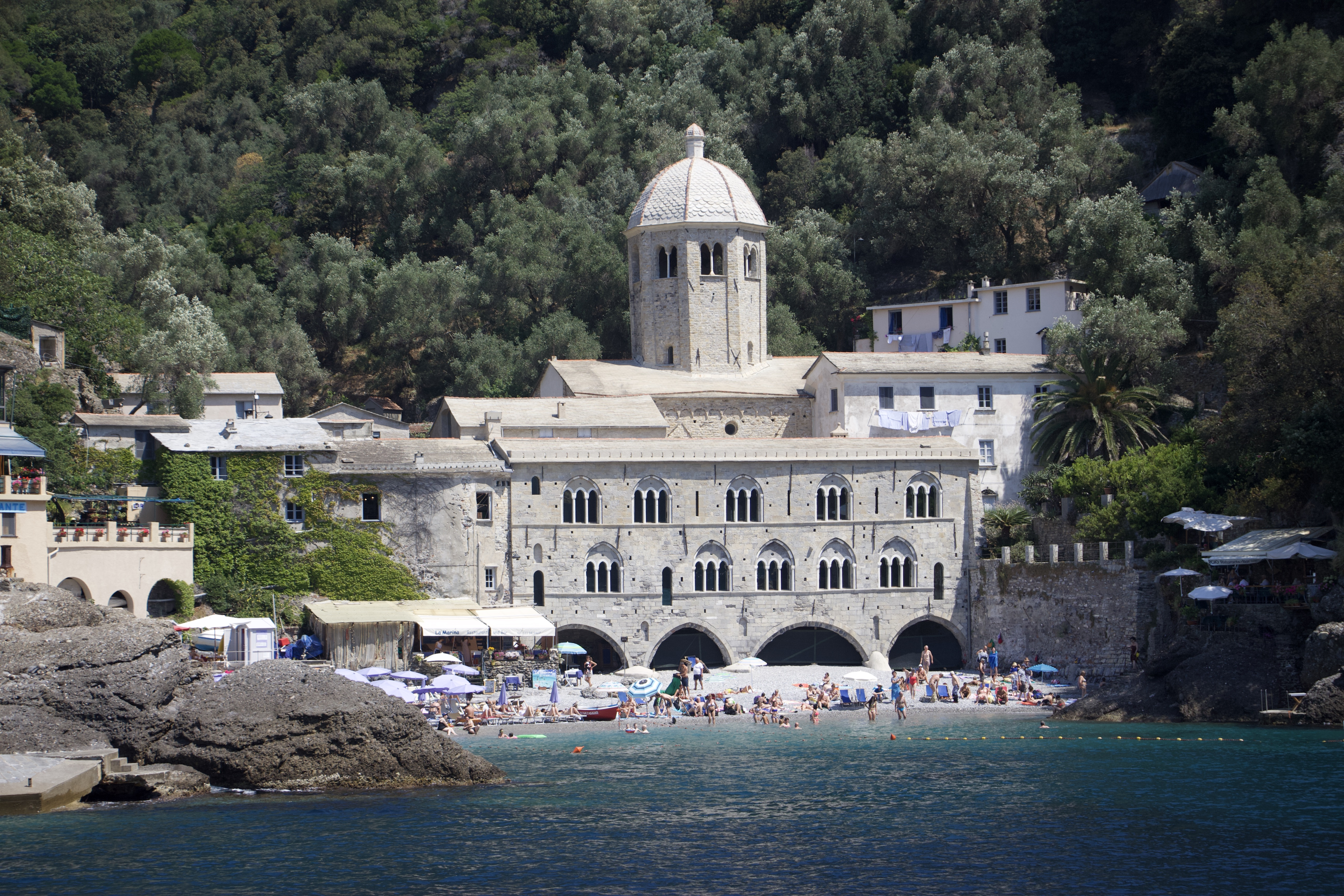
- View of San Fruttuoso from the sea

- Location within Italy
- Location: Camogli, Liguria, Italy

History
- Built: 10th to 13th century

Site notes
- Architectural style: Romanesque
- Owner: Fondo Ambiente Italiano
- Website: San Fruttuoso Abbey

San Fruttuoso Abbey (

Italian: Abbazia di San Fruttuoso) is a Romanesque religious building located in a secluded bay in the Italian Riviera near Genoa, between Camogli and Portofino, The abbey used to be under the patronage of the Genoese aristocratic Doria family, who protected it with a watchtower built by the architect Giovanni Ponzello in 1562.

It is the seat of the Catholic parish of San Fruttuoso di Capodimonte, belonging to the Vicariate of Recco-Uscio-Camogli of the Archdiocese of Genoa.

It can only be reached by sea or by hiking on steep wooded trails, as no road access exists.

== St Fructuosus ==
The abbey is dedicated to Saint Fructuosus, a third-century bishop of Tarraco (now Tarragona in north-east Spain) who was martyred during the persecutions of the Roman Emperor Valerian. In the eighth century, the relics of Fructuosus were translated at the abbey by Greek monks and are still preserved there

== History ==
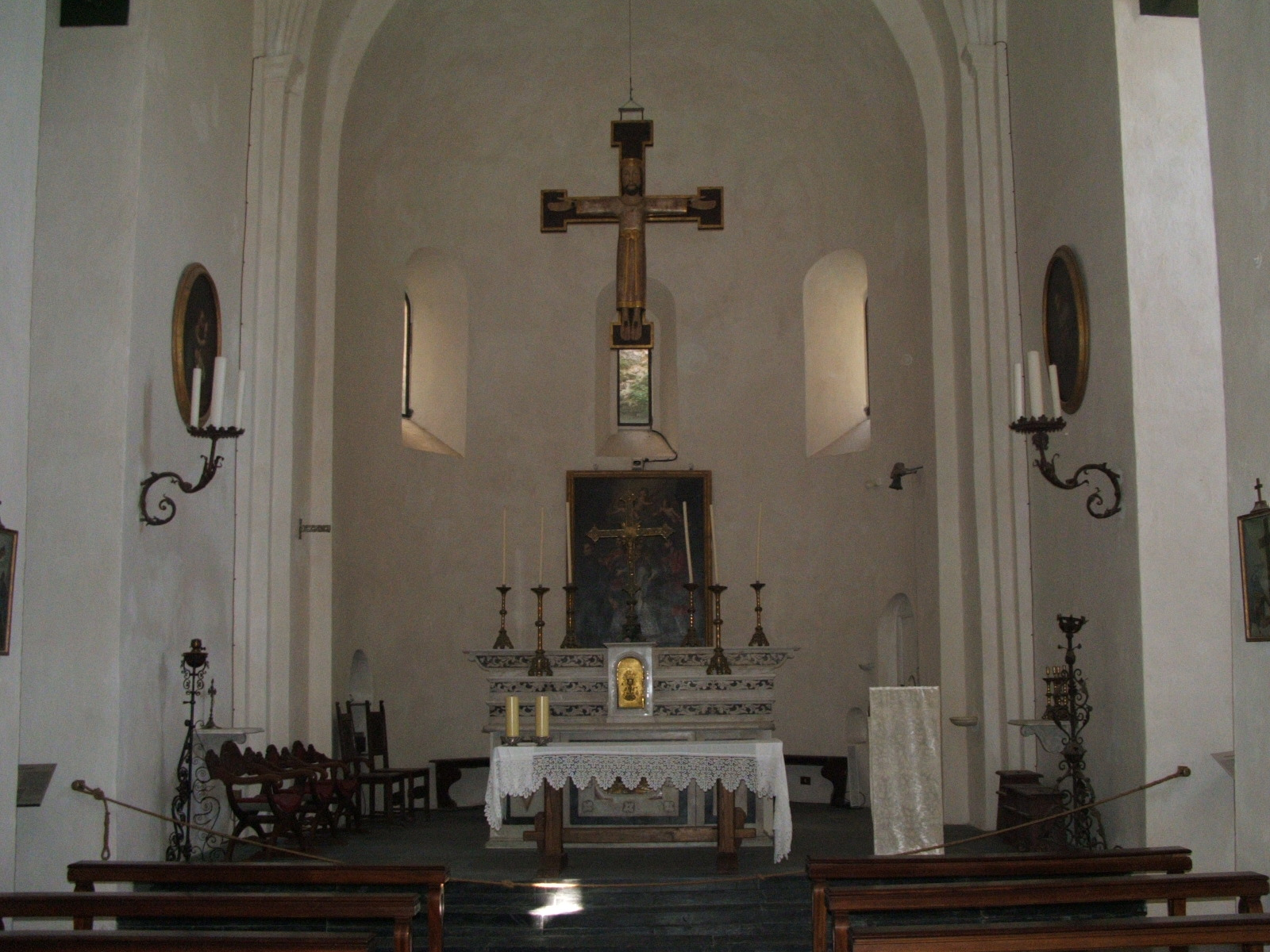
The abbey church

The abbey was founded by the Order of Saint Benedict and most of its buildings date to the 10th and 11th century. The original 10th-century church tower had a Byzantine-style spherical top, later replaced with the octagonal tower still present today.

The cloisters were built in the 12th century and modified in the 16th century upon commission of the prince-admiral Andrea Doria (1466-1560).

The sea-facing wing was constructed in the 13th century and modeled on the design of the aristocratic palaces of Genoa.

The abbey contains the tombs of members of the Genoese Doria family, dating from 1275 to 1305, alongside other burials and an ancient Roman sarcophagus. The Doria tombs are decorated in black slate and white marble stripes, typical of the Ligurian architecture of the period.

To protect the abbey from the incursions of Barbary pirates, the Doria family commissioned a watchtower, the Torre Doria, erected by Giovanni Ponzello in 1562.

By the 17th century the abbey's fortunes had declined and some of its premises were used as a sheep barn. In 1730, Camillo Doria restored the abbey and returned the church to liturgical use.

In 1915, some of the buildings were damaged by a flood and restored by the Italian Government in 1933.

Christ of the Abyss

In 1954, an underwater statue of Jesus, the Christ of the Abyss, was erected in the bay of San Fruttuoso at a depth of 17 metres (56 ft).

In 1983, the last descendants of the Doria Pamphilj family donated the Abbey and its dependencies to the heritage organization Fondo per l'Ambiente Italiano, which conducted a complete renovation of the buildings from 1985 to 2017.

== In literature ==
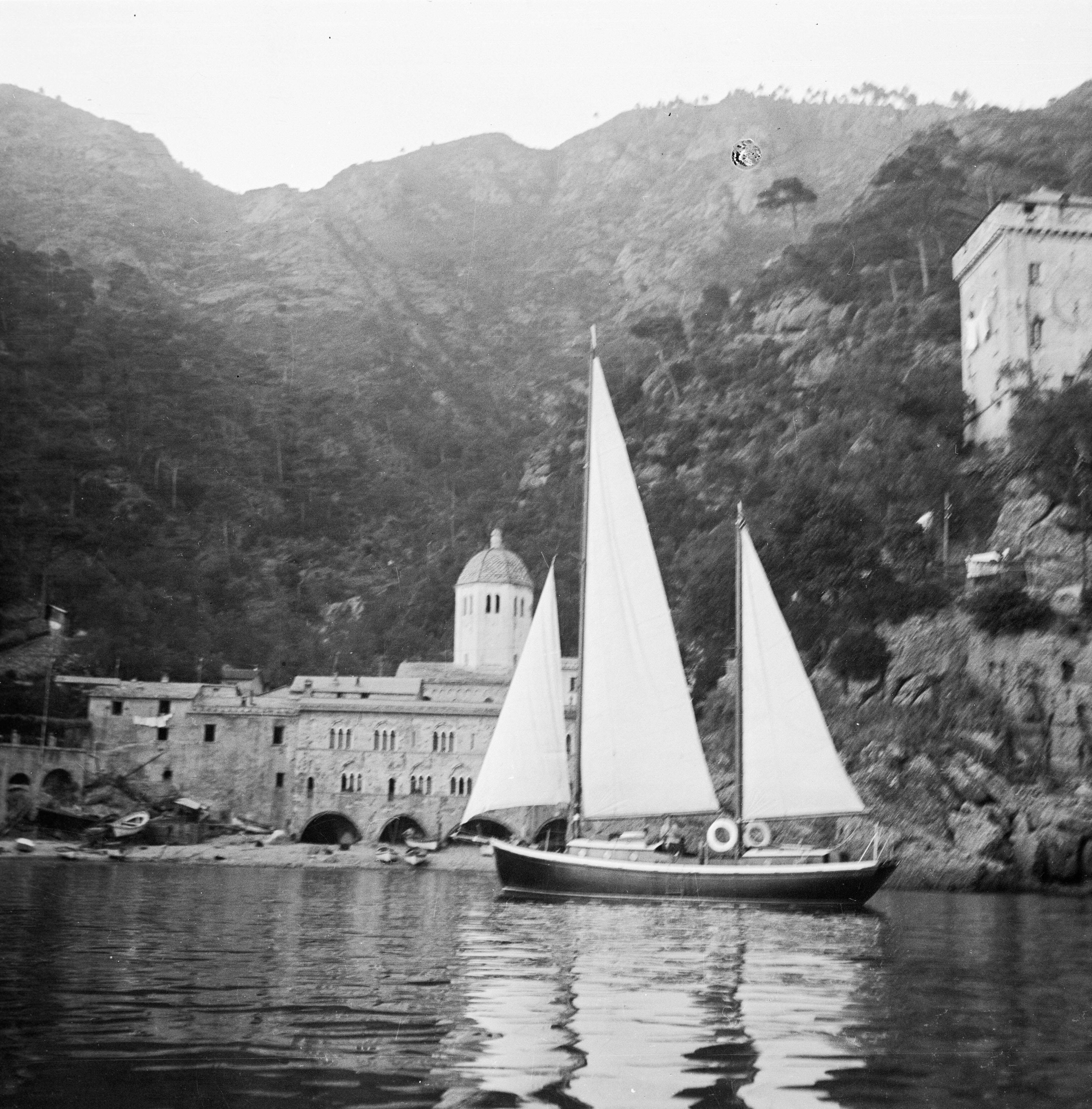
Finnish writer Göran Schildt's boat Daphne at San Fruttuoso in 1948.

San Fruttuoso was visited in 1948 by the Finnish writer Göran Schildt, in documented travels aboard the ketch Daphne.

== See also ==
- Genoa
- Republic of Genoa
- Andrea Doria
- Doria (family)
- Castello Brown
