= Enchanted April (1935 film) =

1935 film by Harry Beaumont

- Directed by: Harry Beaumont
- Written by: Samuel Hoffenstein; Ray Harris
- Based on: The Enchanted April by Elizabeth von Arnim
- Produced by: Kenneth Macgowan
- Starring: Ann Harding; Frank Morgan; Katharine Alexander; Reginald Owen; Jane Baxter; Ralph Forbes; Jessie Ralph; Charles Judels; Rafaela Ottiano
- Cinematography: Edward Cronjager
- Edited by: George Hively
- Music by: Roy Webb
- Production company: RKO Radio Pictures
- Release date: February 1, 1935
- Running time: 66 minutes
- Country: United States
- Language: English
- Budget: $346,000
- Box office: $165,000

Enchanted April is a 1935 American comedy drama film directed by Harry Beaumont and starring Ann Harding, Frank Morgan and Katharine Alexander. It was made by RKO Pictures. The original 1922 novel The Enchanted April has also been adapted for the stage multiple times, and adapted for the 1991 British film by screenwriter Peter Barnes.

== Plot ==
At Hampstead Court Housewives Club, two women sit in the living room with a fireplace. Outside it's raining. One of the women reads a book (a biography of Madame du Barry); the other woman is nervously looking around the room and finally decides to look up the newspaper. When she sees a certain announcement, she has to talk, saying to the other woman how beautiful it would be to leave dreadful London and go south to Italy, renting a castle for two or more people and splitting the costs. So they find their way to San Salvatore, and the Enchanted April is there from the very minute they arrive.

Their husbands and lovers are soon appear and pass by, and the Italians those who know understand the English people. A mixture of slapstick comedy and on the other side the refined presence of Ann Harding.

== Cast ==
- Ann Harding as Lottie Wilkins
- Katharine Alexander as Rose Arbuthnot
- Frank Morgan as Mr. Wilkins
- Reginald Owen as Mr. Arbuthnot
- Jane Baxter as Lady Caroline Dester
- Ralph Forbes as Mr. Briggs
- Jessie Ralph as Mrs. Fisher
- Charles Judels as Domenico
- Rafaela Ottiano as Francesca

== Setting ==
San Salvatore is based on Castello Brown, overlooking Portofino, where Elizabeth von Arnim had stayed. The film was not shot on location, but Jane Baxter did visit later "to see what the house was really like".

== Home media ==
Enchanted April was released in 2005 on a region 2 French DVD on the "Éditions Montparnasse" label, titled Avril enchanté. It features a very clean print from an unconverted NTSC-PAL master, hence its unaltered 66 minute running time, and optional French subtitles in a small yellow font. Additionally, there is an informative 2 1/2 minute intro – in French, without subtitles – by film historian and restorer Serge Bromberg of Lobster Films.
