= Grecian Rocks (reef) =

Coral reef in the Florida Keys, US

- Location within Florida Location within the Caribbean

Location
- Location: Caribbean
- Coordinates: 25°06′39″N 80°18′16″W
- Country: United States

Geology
- Type: reef

Grecian Rocks is a coral reef located within the Florida Keys National Marine Sanctuary. It lies to the east of Key Largo, within the Key Largo Existing Management Area, which is immediately to the east of John Pennekamp Coral Reef State Park. This reef is within a Sanctuary Preservation Area (SPA).

Grecian Rocks are south of Dry Rocks, a smaller reef.
