= Dry Rocks =

Coral reef in the Florida Keys, US

- Christ of the Abyss

- Location within Florida Location within the Caribbean

Location
- Location: Caribbean
- Coordinates: 25°07′20″N 80°18′00″W
- Country: United States

Geology
- Type: reef

Dry Rocks (or Key Largo Dry Rocks) is a coral reef located within the Florida Keys National Marine Sanctuary. It lies east of Key Largo, within the Key Largo Existing Management Area, which is immediately east of John Pennekamp Coral Reef State Park. The reef lies within a Sanctuary Preservation Area (SPA). It is close to Grecian Rocks and The Elbow.

A copy of the famous Christ of the Abyss statue is located at this reef.

This reef is distinct from White Banks Dry Rocks, which is landward of Molasses Reef and French Reef.
