= The Elbow (reef) =

Coral reef in the Florida Keys, US

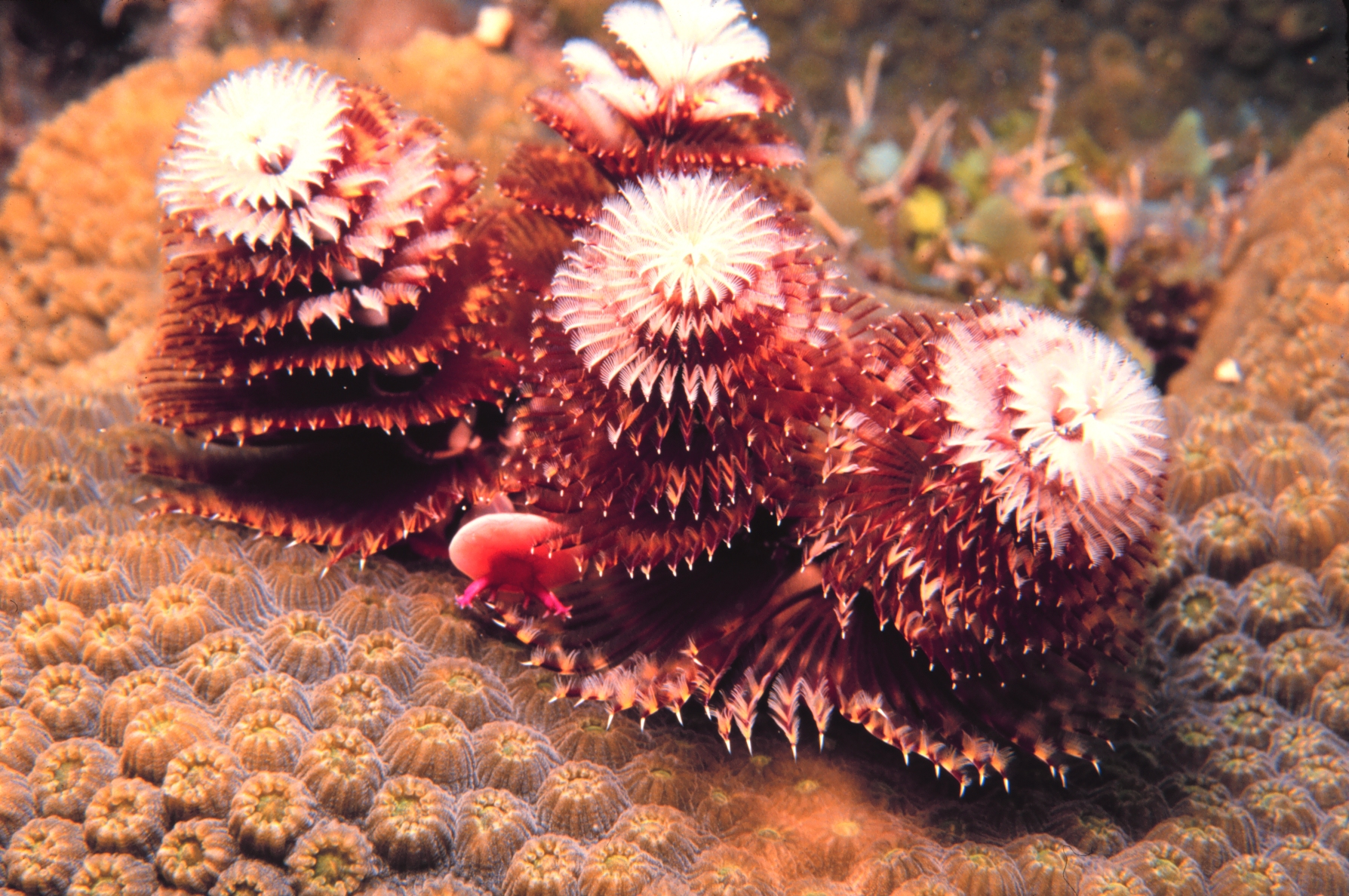
- Spirobranchus giganteus

- Location within Florida Location within the Caribbean

Location
- Location: Caribbean
- Coordinates: 25°08′44″N 80°15′39″W
- Country: United States

Geology
- Type: reef

The Elbow (or Elbow Reef) is a coral reef located within the Florida Keys National Marine Sanctuary. It lies to the east of Key Largo, within the Key Largo Existing Management Area, which is immediately to the east of John Pennekamp Coral Reef State Park along the Hawk Channel passage. This reef is within a Sanctuary Preservation Area (SPA). The Elbow is southwest of Carysfort and east of Dry Rocks reefs.
