= Christ of the Abyss =

Submerged statue of Jesus Christ

Coordinates: 44.314038°N 9.174979°E

- Christ of the Abyss at San Fruttuoso, Liguria
- Artist: Guido Galletti
- Year: 1954
- Medium: bronze
- Location: San Fruttuoso, Liguria, Italy

Christ of the Abyss (Italian: Il Cristo degli Abissi) is a submerged bronze statue of Jesus Christ by Guido Galletti, the original cast of which is located in the Mediterranean Sea, off San Fruttuoso, between Camogli and Portofino on the Italian Riviera. Various other casts of the statue are located in other places worldwide, in underwater locations, churches and museums.

== Original clay statue ==
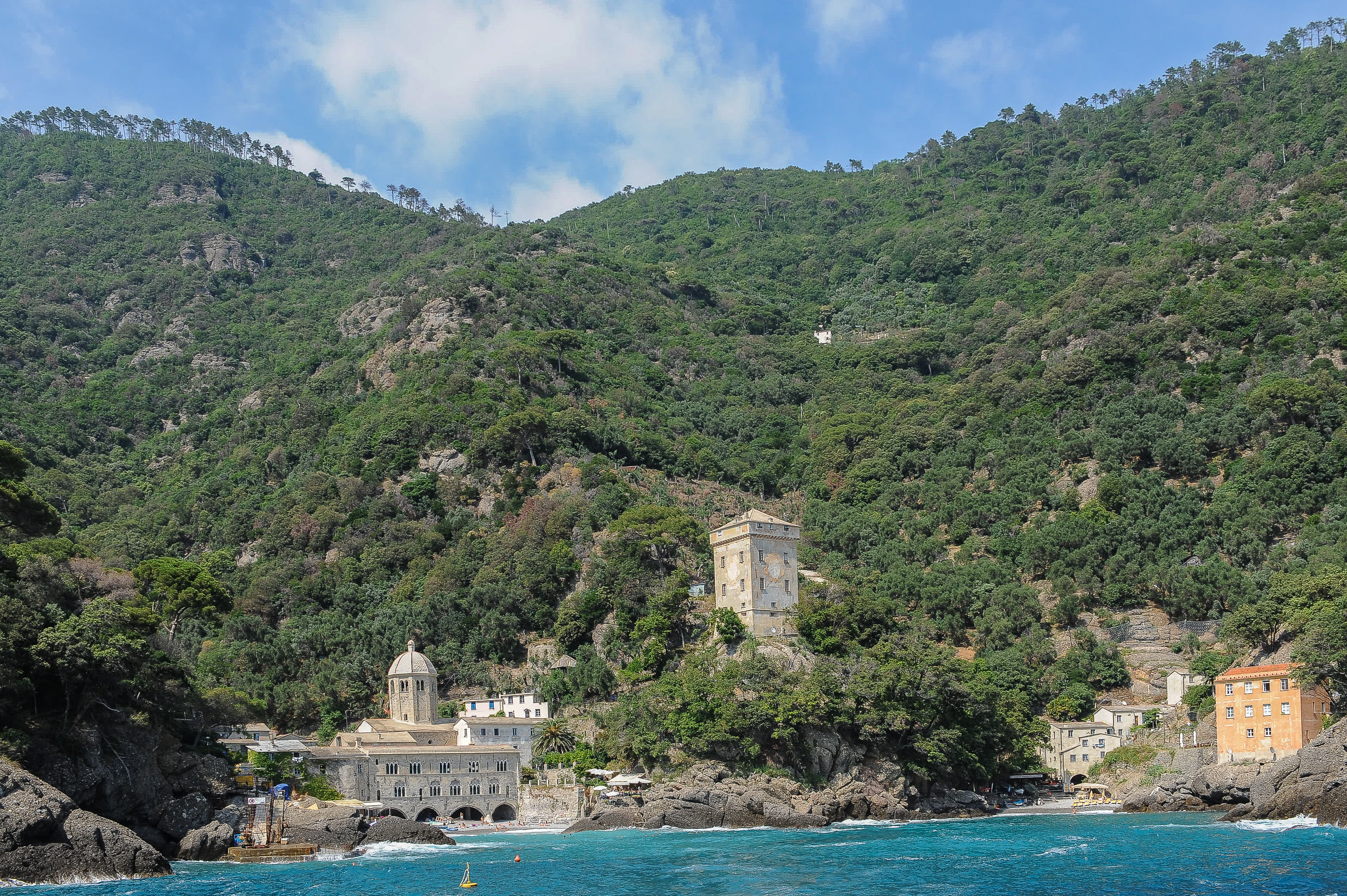
The cove of San Fruttuoso

The original clay positive, minus the arms, was located in a foundry in 1993. The arms were later found and attached, but not the hands, which had to be replaced. The reconfigured clay sculpture is now on display at the National Museum of Underwater Activities in Ravenna, Italy.

== Three bronze statues ==
=== Italy (1954) ===
The original bronze statue was placed in the Mediterranean Sea on 22 August 1954, at approximately 17 metres (56 ft) depth, and stands 2.5 metres (8 ft) tall. It was sculpted by Guido Galletti, based on an idea of Italian diving instructor Duilio Marcante. The statue was placed near the spot where Dario Gonzatti, the first Italian to use SCUBA gear, died in 1947. It depicts Christ offering a benediction of peace, with his head and hands raised skyward. The statue was subsequently dedicated to the memory of Marcante.

Due to increasing amounts of corrosion and the growth of crustaceans, the statue was removed from the water and restored in 2003. A hand that had been detached, presumably by an anchor, was also replaced. The statue was returned to the water with a new base on 17 July 2004. The statue was again cleaned in 2018.

=== Grenada (1961) ===
A second bronze sculpture, cast from the same mold as the original bronze statue, was placed on the coastline of St. George's, Grenada. It was gifted to the people of Grenada in thanks for rescuing the crew and passengers of the Italian vessel MV Bianca C., which was destroyed by fire in the port of St. George's. The sculpture was placed on 22 October 1961.

=== U.S. (1962) ===
Christ of the Abyss near Key Largo

A third bronze statue, from the original mold, was presented to the Underwater Society of America in New York in 1962, and shipped by boat to Chicago, where it was set up for unveiling in the ballroom of the Palmer House Hotel at the Underwater Society of America 1962 convention. This copy of the original Christ of the Abyss is named Christ of the Deep. On 25 August 1965, it was placed in approximately 25 feet (7.6 m) of water off Key Largo, Florida, near Dry Rocks, approximately six miles east of the island of Key Largo in what was then the waters of John Pennekamp Coral Reef State Park. The boundaries of the park changed in 1972, so the statue is now in the Florida Keys National Marine Sanctuary, just outside of John Pennekamp Coral Reef State Park. The statue is 9 feet (2.7 m) tall and weighs around 1,102 pounds (500 kg), and the concrete base to which it is attached weighs approximately 42,000 pounds (19,100 kg).

== In popular culture ==
- In Part 3 of the Netflix Original series Bloodline (Season 1, Episode 3), Danny Rayburn is seen taking guests at his family's Monroe County, Florida inn, Rayburn House, snorkeling at Christ of the Abyss in Florida.
- An image of one of the statues was used as cover art, both for BT's 1995 album Ima, and for God Lives Underwater's 1995 debut album Empty.
- In Contemporary Christian music, the Italian sculpture was the inspiration for the song "Christ Is Lower Still" by The Porter's Gate in the album "Sanctuary Songs."

== See also ==
- List of statues of Jesus
