= Portofino =

Town and resort in Italy

- Comune
- Comune di Portofino
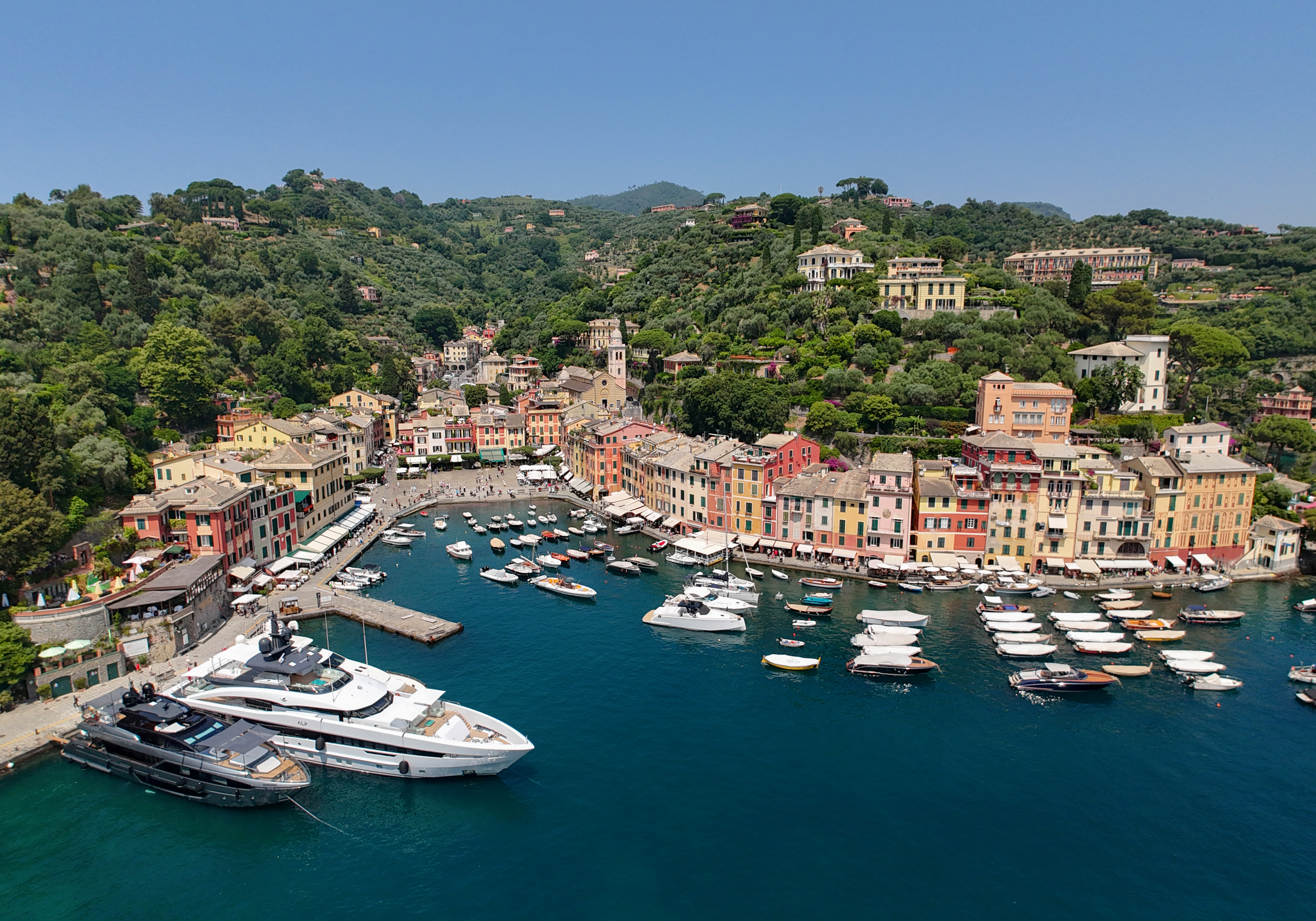
- View of Portofino

- Flag Coat of arms

- Location within Italy Location within Liguria
- Coordinates: 44°18′14″N 9°12′28″E
- Country: Italy
- Region: Liguria
- Metropolitan city: Genoa (GE)

Government
  - Mayor: Matteo Viacava

Area
  - Total: 2.53 km^{2} (0.98 sq mi)
- Elevation: 4 m (13 ft)

Population (31 December 2021)
  - Total: 379
  - Density: 150/km^{2} (388/sq mi)
- Demonym: Portofinesi
- Time zone: UTC+1 (CET)
  - Summer (DST): UTC+2 (CEST)
- Postal code: 16034
- Dialing code: 0185
- Patron saint: St. George
- Saint day: St. George's Bonfire: 23 April. Religious celebration the first Sunday after.
- Website: Official website

Portofino (Italian pronunciation: [ˌpɔrtoˈfiːno]; Ligurian: Portofin [ˌpɔɾtuˈfiŋ]) is a comune located in the Metropolitan City of Genoa on the Italian Riviera. The town is clustered around its small harbour, and is known for the colourfully painted buildings that line the shore. Since the late 19th century, Portofino has attracted tourism of the European aristocracy and it is now a resort for the world's jet set.

== History ==
Pliny the Elder (AD 23–79) referred to Portus Delphini (Port of the Dolphin) as on the Ligurian coast between Genoa and the Gulf of Tigullio.

The village is mentioned in a diploma from 986 by Adelaide of Italy, which assigned it to the nearby Abbey of San Fruttuoso di Capodimonte. In 1171, together with the neighbouring Santa Margherita Ligure, it was included in Rapallo's commune jurisdiction. After 1229 it was part of the Republic of Genoa. The town's natural harbour supported a fleet of fishing boats, but was somewhat too cramped to provide more than a temporary safe haven for the growing merchant marine of the Republic of Genoa.

In 1409, when Charles VI of France was Doge of Genoa, he sold Portofino to the Republic of Florence. When Charles was ousted from Genoa, the Florentines gave it back. In the 15th century it was a fief of families such as the Fieschi, Spinola, Adorno, and Doria.

In 1815, it became part of the Kingdom of Sardinia and, from 1861, of the unified Kingdom of Italy.

In the late 19th century, first British, then other Northern European aristocratic tourists began to visit Portofino, which they reached by horse and cart from Santa Margherita Ligure. Aubrey Herbert and Elizabeth von Arnim were among the more famous English people to make the area fashionable. Eventually, more expatriates built expensive holiday houses, and by 1950, tourism had replaced fishing as the town's chief industry, and the waterfront was a continuous ring of restaurants and cafés.

== Main sights ==
- Statue of Christ of the Abyss, placed underwater on 29 August 1954 in the inlet at a depth of 17 metres (56 ft). This statue was placed to protect fishermen and scuba divers and in memory of Dario Gonzatti, the first Italian to use SCUBA gear, who died in 1947. Sculpted by Guido Galletti, it represents Christ in the act of blessing while looking towards the sky with open arms in a sign of peace.
- Castello Brown (16th century).
- Divo Martino, Portofino (12th century).
- San Giorgio, Portofino, housing some saints' relics.
- Oratory of Santa Maria Assunta, in Gothic style.
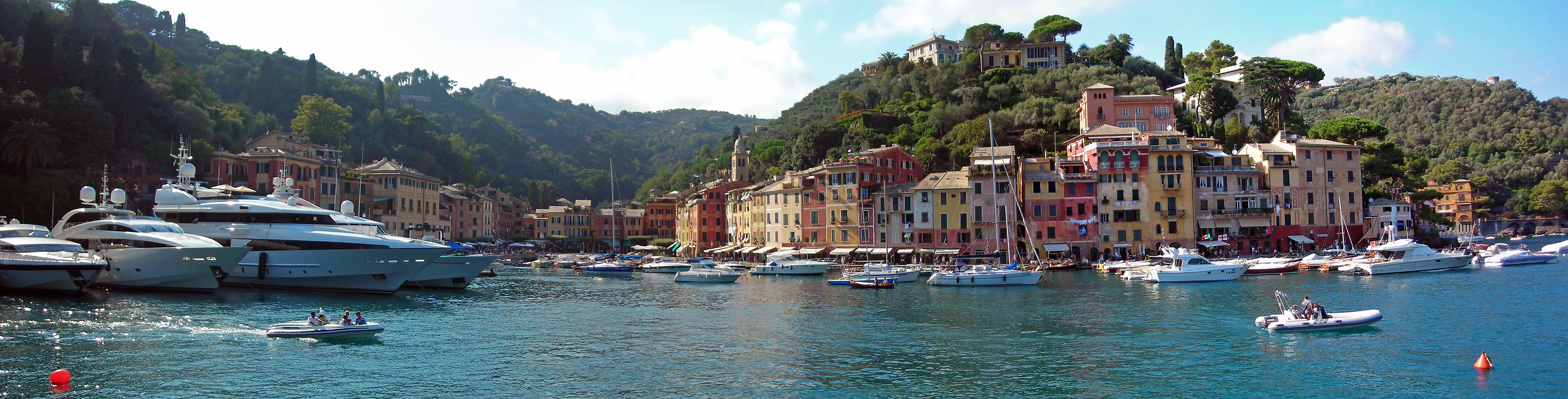
Panoramic view of Portofino

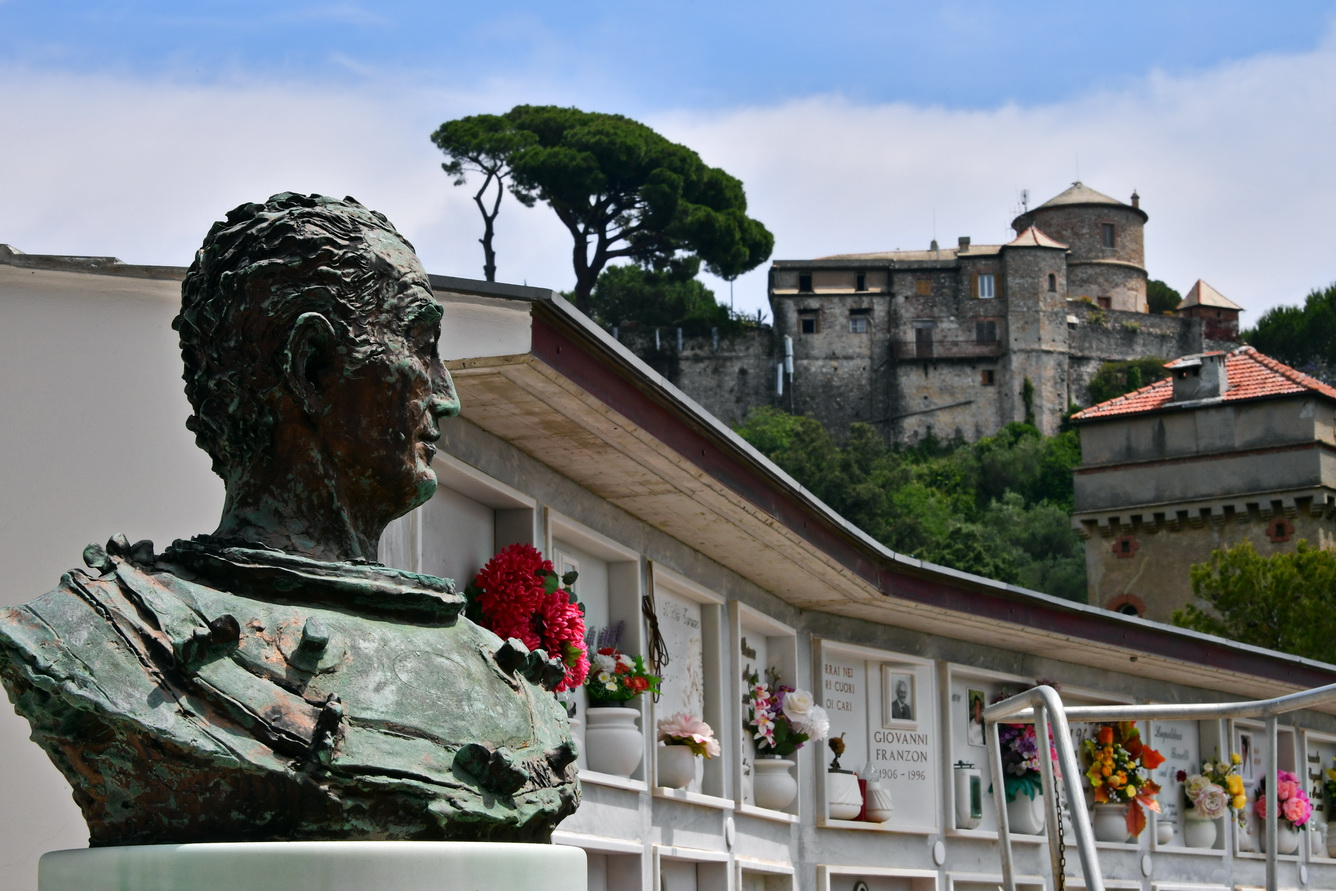
Portofino cemetery and Castello Brown

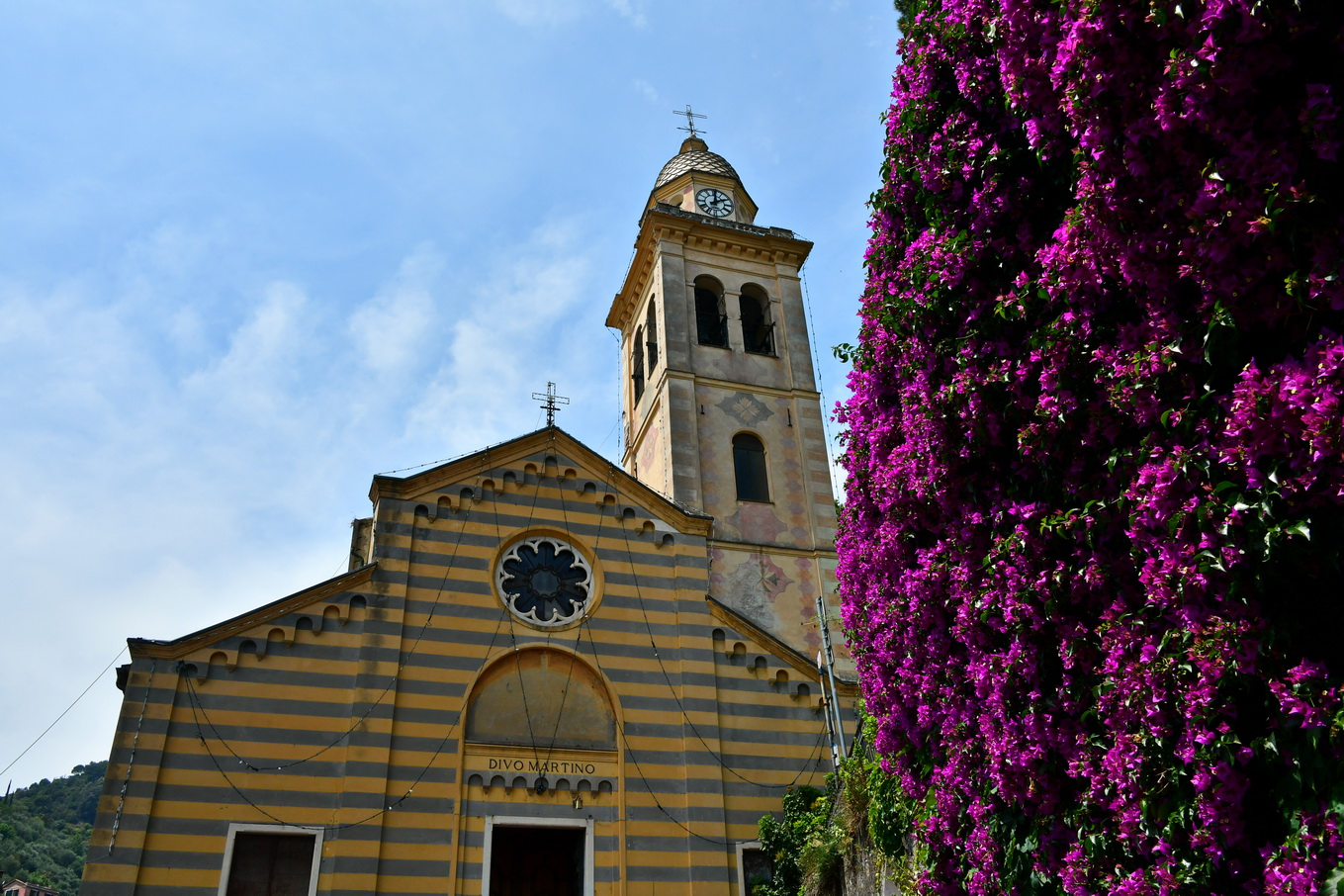
St. Martin

== In popular culture ==
- The Enchanted April, a 1922 best-selling novel by Elizabeth von Arnim based on the author's stay in Castello Brown, is credited with making Portofino fashionable. The novel was the basis of a 1991 feature filmed in the Castello, with a cast including Joan Plowright, Miranda Richardson and Alfred Molina. The film was nominated for three Oscars.
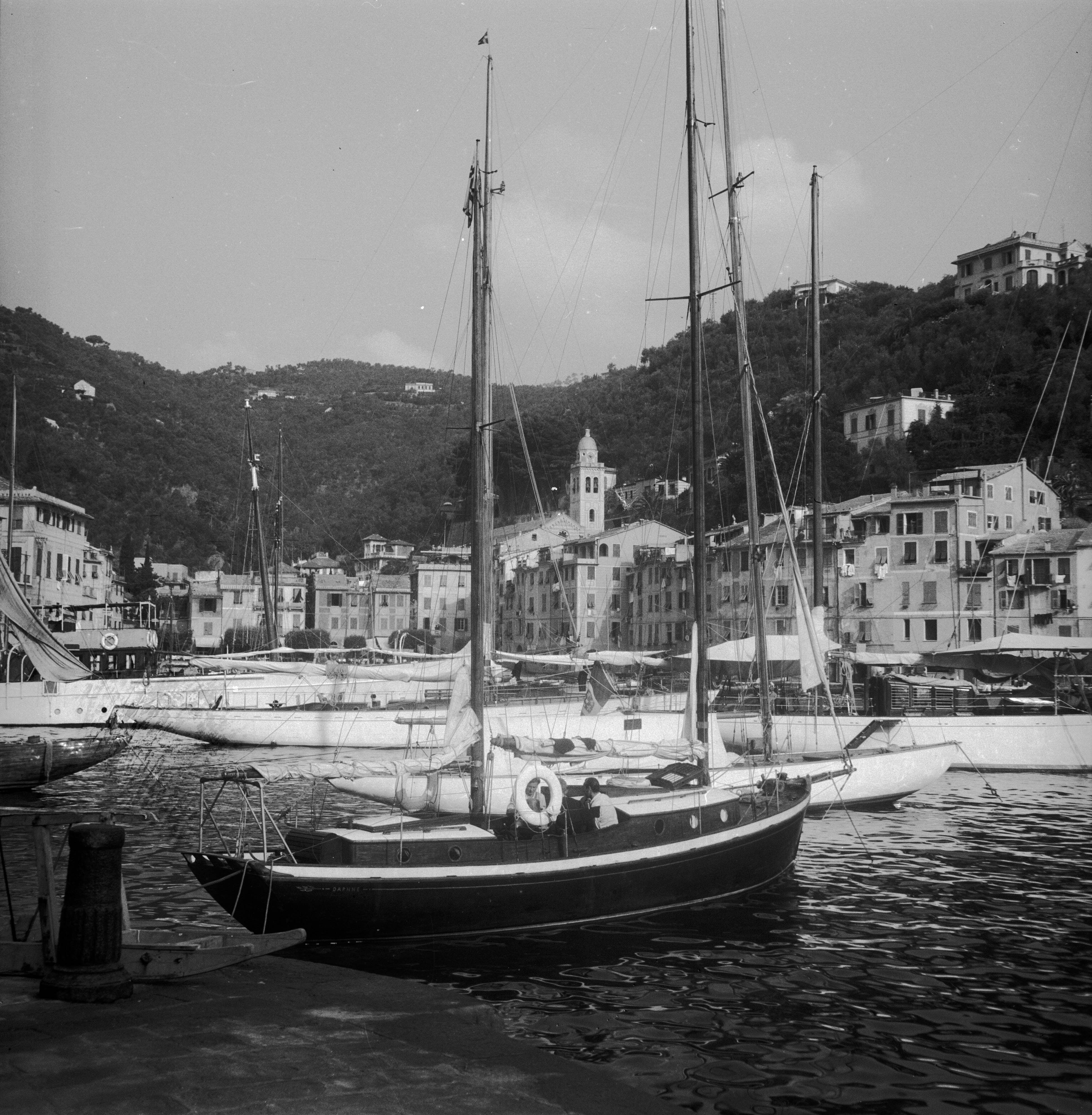
- Göran Schildt's Daphne in Portofino in 1948
  Portofino was visited by Finland Swedish writer Göran Schildt and his ketch Daphne in 1948 on the start of his travels on the Mediterranean Sea.
- Portofino is often thought to be the inspiration for Sir Clough Williams-Ellis' Italianate village named Portmeirion, built between 1925 and 1975, in north Wales. However, this was repeatedly denied by the architect. He stated only that he wanted to pay tribute to the atmosphere of the Mediterranean. He did, however, draw on a love of the Italian village, stating "How should I not have fallen for Portofino? Indeed its image remained with me as an almost perfect example of the man-made adornment and use of an exquisite site."
- In 1959, Dalida released the song "Love in Portofino", written by Leo Chiosso and composed by Fred Buscaglione. With lyrics in French and Italian language, it became a hit and was later iconised alongside the village's name. It also spawned several international covers, including Andrea Bocelli's in 2013 which was followed by a concert recorded and issued on DVD.
- Portofino is the eponym of Frank Schaeffer's Portofino: A Novel (1992). It was the first of Schaeffer's Calvin Becker Trilogy.
- Portofino is one of the shooting locations of the 1995 Antonioni/Wenders film, Beyond the Clouds.
- There is a full-scale replica, in authentic detail, of Portofino Bay at Universal Orlando Resort in Orlando, United States, which opened in September 1999.
- Portofino inspired in 2001 a recreation of the seaside town in the Mediterranean Harbor area at Tokyo DisneySea in Chiba, Japan. It also served as the namesake for the restaurant Cafe Portofino.
- Portofino was featured in 2008 in the BBC television series Top Gear. Richard Hammond, in a Ferrari Daytona raced James May in a carbon fibre powerboat from Portofino to St Tropez in France.
- Ferrari named one of their sports cars the Ferrari Portofino in 2017. In 2018, the Scuderia Ferrari Club Portofino was founded.
- IWC Schaffhausen named one of their watches the IWC Portofino.
- The 2022 six-episode period drama television series Hotel Portofino, set in the 1920s, was created by Matt Baker in 2020, filmed principally on location in Portofino in 2021, and is being shown on Britbox, PBS, and other television networks. The show was renewed for a second season.
- Portofino is referenced in Taylor Swift's song "Elizabeth Taylor", the second song on her album The Life of a Showgirl.

== Notable residents ==
- King Richard I of England (1157–1199), in 1190
- Pope Gregory XI (1330–1378), in 1377
- Henry Herbert (1831–1890), British politician
- Guy de Maupassant (1850–1893), French writer
- Guglielmo Marconi (1874–1937), Italian engineer, inventor of radio
- Giuseppe Amisani (1879–1941), Italian painter
- Michele Cascella (1892–1989), Italian painter
- Rex Harrison (1908–1990), English actor
- Lilli Palmer (1914–1986), German actress, wife of Rex Harrison

== Twin towns ==
- Kinsale, Republic of Ireland
- Palma, Spain
- Cassis, France
- Belvedere, California, United States

== See also ==
- Castello Brown
- Cervara Abbey
- Italian Riviera
- List of castles in Italy
- Paraggi
