= Enchanted April (1991 film) =

1991 film

- Directed by: Mike Newell
- Written by: Peter Barnes
- Based on: The Enchanted April by Elizabeth von Arnim
- Produced by: Mark Shivas; Simon Relph; Ann Scott; Matthew Hamilton
- Starring: Miranda Richardson; Josie Lawrence; Polly Walker; Joan Plowright; Alfred Molina; Michael Kitchen; Jim Broadbent
- Cinematography: Rex Maidment
- Edited by: Dick Allen
- Music by: Richard Rodney Bennett
- Production company: BBC Films
- Distributed by: Curzon Films; Miramax
- Release date: 6 November 1991
- Running time: 95 minutes
- Country: United Kingdom
- Language: English
- Budget: £1.1 million
- Box office: $13.2 million

Enchanted April is a 1991 British historical drama film directed by Mike Newell. The screenplay by Peter Barnes was adapted from Elizabeth von Arnim's 1922 novel The Enchanted April. It stars Miranda Richardson, Josie Lawrence, Polly Walker, and Joan Plowright, with Alfred Molina, Michael Kitchen, and Jim Broadbent in supporting roles.

The film was nominated for three Academy Awards; Richardson and Plowright were awarded the Golden Globe for Best Actress in a Musical or Comedy and Best Supporting Actress, respectively.

== Plot ==
Following World War I, Rose Arbuthnot and Lotty Wilkins, unacquainted, belong to the same ladies' club. Lotty sees Rose sigh wistfully after reading a newspaper advertisement to "those who appreciate wisteria and sunshine" for rental of a small Italian castle. Impulsively, Lotty approaches Rose, suggesting they share a month's expenses as a break from domestic tedium. Initially wary, Rose begins to fancy the idea of a vacation from her unhappy marriage. Advertising for two reputable ladies to share expenses, they find the elegant but peevish elderly Mrs. Fisher and the beautiful, aloof, and wealthy Lady Caroline Dester.

Rose's husband, Frederick, authors erotic novels under a pseudonym, and they have grown distant due to her disapproval. Rose is unaware he moves in a literary circle frequenting the salon of Lady Dester, mother of Lady Caroline. Frederick is careful to keep his extramarital escapades discreet; thus Rose is unaware he has designs on Caroline.

Fed up with "grabbers" latching onto her for her celebrated beauty and wealth, Caroline seeks a month's refuge at San Salvatore. Tired of always being the centre of attention, she initially secludes herself from the other renters, relaxing in the lush landscape.

Lotty's bored frugal husband, Mellersh, concentrates on business and networking. He tracks her expenses to the penny but neglects her. Inconveniently, Mellersh suggests they take a holiday. Uncharacteristically asserting herself, Lotty replies she has been invited on holiday by an acquaintance and will go there instead. She does not disclose she is paying her expenses with money saved from her household allowance.

Mrs. Fisher, a widow rigid in her ways, immerses herself in memories, rereading works of now dead Illustrious personalities she has met during her lifetime in an exalted circle. Initially, at San Salvatore, finding the other three women a disturbance, she insists on reserving the main drawing room for her exclusive use.

During the holiday, Lady Caroline and Mrs. Fisher clash over dominance and expenses. With tact, the meek Lotty becomes the peacemaker, nonconfrontationally exerting subtle influence over the others. With fresh insight, Lotty observes the attitudes among themselves that have contributed to their life discontentment. Lotty decides to invite Mellersh to San Salvatore and encourages Rose to invite Frederick to repair their marriages. Lotty's disclosure of the presence of Mrs. Fisher and Lady Caroline, two wealthy prospective clients, brings Mellersh eagerly to the refuge.

Thrilled at his wife's intimate friendship with rich prospects, Mellersh exerts himself to be agreeable, mitigating the problem over the first week's expenses. Mellersh declares privately to Lotty that he will pay her expenses so she can keep her savings. He reevaluates his wife and begins to see her as a real social asset.

Tracking the elusive Caroline to San Salvatore in amorous pursuit, Frederick arrives unaware of Rose's presence or her invitation to him at Lotty's urging. Caroline, who knows Frederick by his pseudonym, does not know he is Rose's husband. Caught off-guard when an unexpected Rose greets him warmly with a kiss, Frederick "introduces" himself to Caroline as "Frederick Arbuthnot, Rose's HUSBAND." Tactfully, Caroline does not reveal their prior acquaintance.

San Salvatore's owner, George Briggs, pays an unexpected call on his tenants. Attracted to Rose, who he had mistaken for a war widow, he is disappointed to find her living husband. Used to always being the centre of attention, Caroline is astonished to see George—extremely nearsighted due to a war injury—is clearly more drawn to Rose. Frederick, too, begins to see Rose with new appreciation.

Perversely, Caroline is drawn to George because he does not fawn over her. His nearsightedness means he judges women by their qualities, not their looks. Perceiving George's distress, during a walk, Caroline elicits his confidence in admitting his disappointment in Rose's marriage. In turn, Caroline confides lingering unhappiness at the loss of her fiancé in the war. When the nearsighted George trips over a tree root, Caroline reaches out to steady him, declaring "I had to grab you!"

Mrs. Fisher now values connection with other people. She and Lotty discuss how the group has organically paired off. Lotty assures her there can be many combinations of "pairs". She and Mrs. Fisher will be a pair, forming an enduring friendship.

== Cast ==
- Josie Lawrence as Lotty Wilkins
- Miranda Richardson as Rose Arbuthnot
- Polly Walker as Caroline Dester
- Joan Plowright as Mrs. Fisher
- Alfred Molina as Mellersh Wilkins
- Jim Broadbent as Frederick Arbuthnot
- Michael Kitchen as George Briggs

== Production ==
The film was shot on location at Castello Brown in Portofino, Italy, the castle where the author of the book had stayed in the 1920s. The score by Richard Rodney Bennett, featuring flute and oboe themes, evokes the film's mood and accentuates the story's yearning and nostalgia.

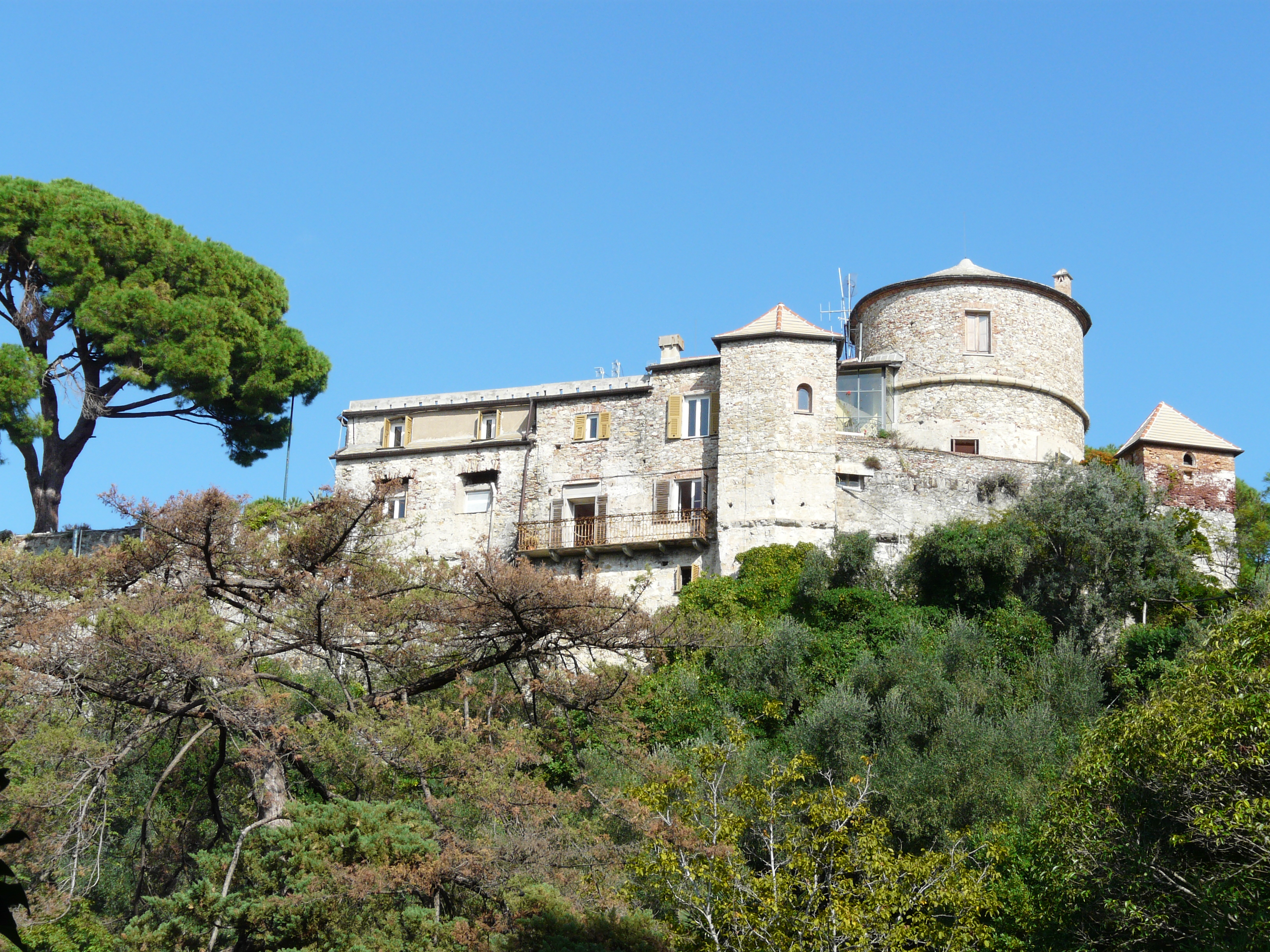
The 15th-century Castello Brown in Portofino, where von Arnim stayed and wrote the novel, and where much of the film was shot.

== Reception ==
The film premiered as the opening night gala of the London Film Festival on 6 November 1991. It gained a positive reaction from critics and holds an 85% rating on Rotten Tomatoes based on 33 reviews. The consensus summarizes: "Mike Newell's adaptation of Elizabeth von Arnim's novel moves at a more generous pace than the 1935 version, allowing excellent performances from Miranda Richardson and Joan Plowright to flourish."

It grossed £64,000 in the United Kingdom and $13.2 million in the United States and Canada.

== Awards and nominations ==
Award	Category	Nominee(s)	Result
Academy Awards	Best Supporting Actress	Joan Plowright	Nominated
Academy Awards	Best Screenplay – Based on Material Previously Produced or Published	Peter Barnes	Nominated
Academy Awards	Best Costume Design	Sheena Napier	Nominated
Cleveland International Film Festival	Best Film	Mike Newell	Won
Golden Globe Awards	Best Motion Picture – Musical or Comedy		Nominated
Golden Globe Awards	Best Actress in a Motion Picture – Musical or Comedy	Miranda Richardson	Won
Golden Globe Awards	Best Supporting Actress – Motion Picture	Joan Plowright	Won
Los Angeles Film Critics Association Awards	Best Supporting Actress	Miranda Richardson	Runner-up
National Society of Film Critics Awards	Best Supporting Actress	Miranda Richardson	2nd Place
New York Film Critics Circle Awards	Best Supporting Actress	Miranda Richardson	Won
Shanghai International Film Festival	Best Feature Film	Mike Newell	Nominated
USC Scripter Awards		Peter Barnes (screenwriter); Elizabeth von Arnim (author)	Nominated
Writers Guild of America Awards	Best Screenplay – Based on Material Previously Produced or Published	Peter Barnes	Nominated

== See also ==
An earlier adaptation of the book was released by RKO Radio Pictures in 1935, with the same name Enchanted April.
