= Charles Leipart =

American dramatist

Charles Leipart is an American musical theatre bookwriter-lyricist and playwright. He was born in Chicago and graduated from Northwestern University. He lives in New York City.

== Works (selection) ==
MUSICALS Book & Lyrics for all works:

- Good Girls Only, the Rehearsal Club Musical, music by Jamey Grisham; additional music by John Kroner and Eric Scott Reed
- Dickens' Haunted Christmas, the new mystery musical, music by Eric Schorr
- Me and Miss Monroe, an original musical, music by William Goldstein
- Enchanted April, a new musical romance adapted from Elizabeth von Arnim's novel The Enchanted April, music by Richard B. Evans
- Frog Kiss, a musical adapted from The Frog Prince by Stephen Mitchell, music by Eric Schorr
- The Showgirl of 52nd Street, an original musical, music by John Kroner
- The Price of Everything, an original musical adapted from Thorstein Veblen's The Theory of The Leisure Class, music by Richard B. Evans
- espresso trasho, an original musical, music by Eric Schorr
- The Doctor's Wife, a musical adapted from Gustave Flaubert's Madame Bovary, music by Eric Schorr

PLAYS

- George and Martha's Wedding Gift, a Play of Enslavement
- Tailoring Hitler, Made-to-Measure in One Act
- The Adolf I Knew, a Play of Collective Memory
- A Kind of Marriage, a play about the private life of British novelist E. M. Forster
- Swimming at the Ritz, a stage play about Pamela Churchill Harriman
- Underfoot in Show Business, a stage play adapted from the comic memoir by Helene Hanff.
- Mr. & Mrs. "A", a stage play
- Deep Sleepers, a comedy, published by Dramatists' Play Service
- The Undefeated Rhumba Champ, a one-act comedy, published by Dramatists Play Service

== Awards ==
- LGBT History Playwriting Initiative Award 2015, Arch and Bruce Brown Foundation, A Kind of Marriage Honorable Mention
- Excellence in Writing: Lyrics, New York Musical Theatre Festival, 2010, Frog Kiss
- Most Promising Musical, New York Musical Theatre Festival, 2010, Frog Kiss Honorable Mention
- Excellence in Writing: Book, New York Musical Theatre Festival, 2010, Frog Kiss Honorable Mention
- Finalist, The Fred Ebb Award, 2005, 2006 & 2008
- Global Search for New Musicals, Cardiff, Wales, 2005, Frog Kiss
- Edward Kleban Foundation Award—Outstanding Librettist, 2001, The Showgirl of 52nd Street
