= San Giorgio, Portofino =

San Giorgio
- Chiesa di San Giorgio (Italian)
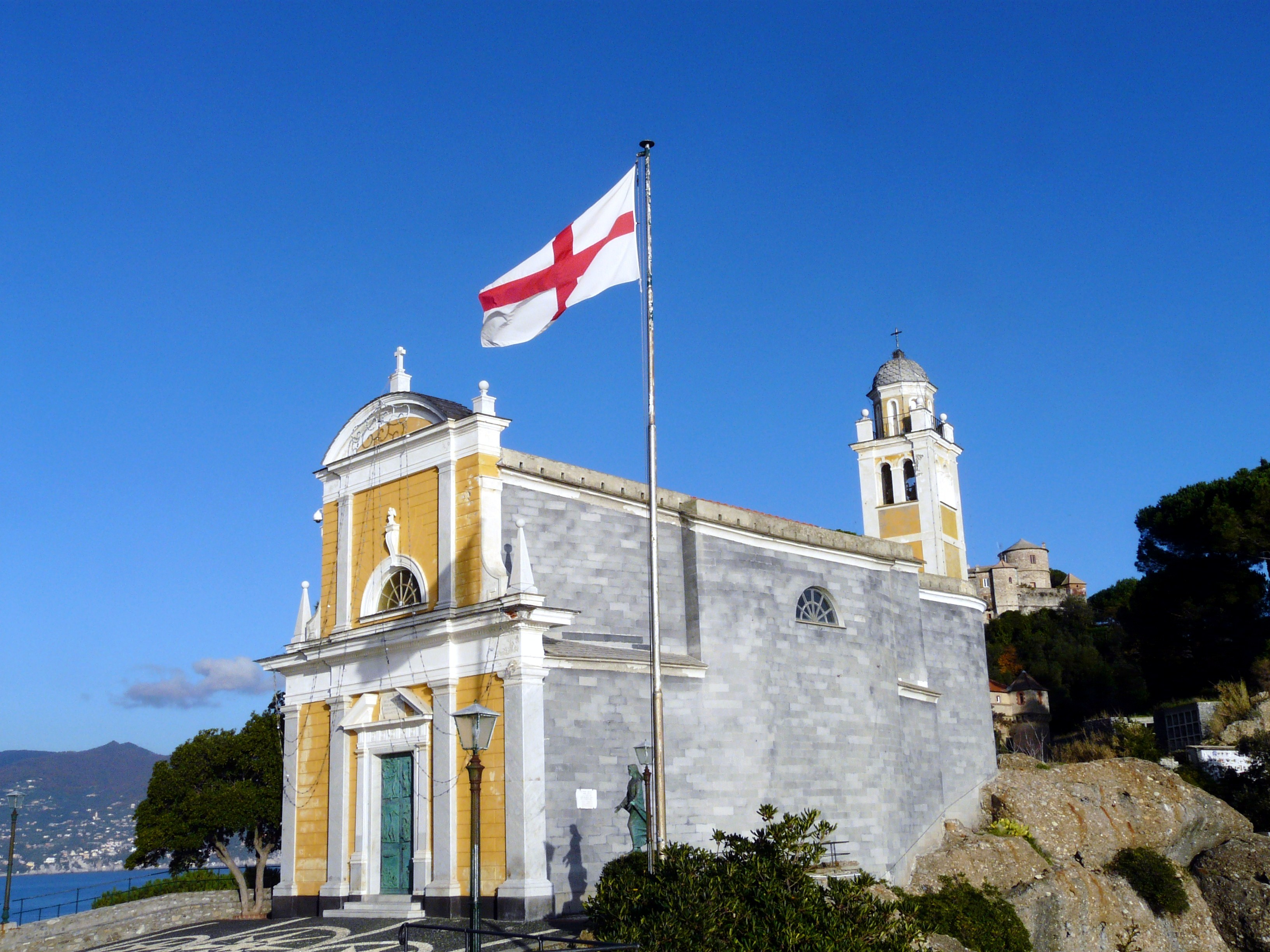
- San Giorgio, Portofino in 2012
- Click on the map for a fullscreen view
- 44°18′05.24″N 9°12′41.63″E
- Country: Italy
- Denomination: Roman Catholic

Architecture
- Functional status: Active

Administration
- Diocese: Diocese of Chiavari

San Giorgio is a Roman Catholic church located in Portofino, Italy.

== History ==
The first construction of the church, dedicated to Saint George, dates back to 1154. In 1691 it was modified and the access road was widened. In 1760 the church was renovated and expanded again. It was destroyed during World War II and rebuilt after the conflict.

== Description ==
The church is located on a cliff overlooking the sea in the village of Portofino, in the Metropolitan City of Genoa.

== Gallery ==
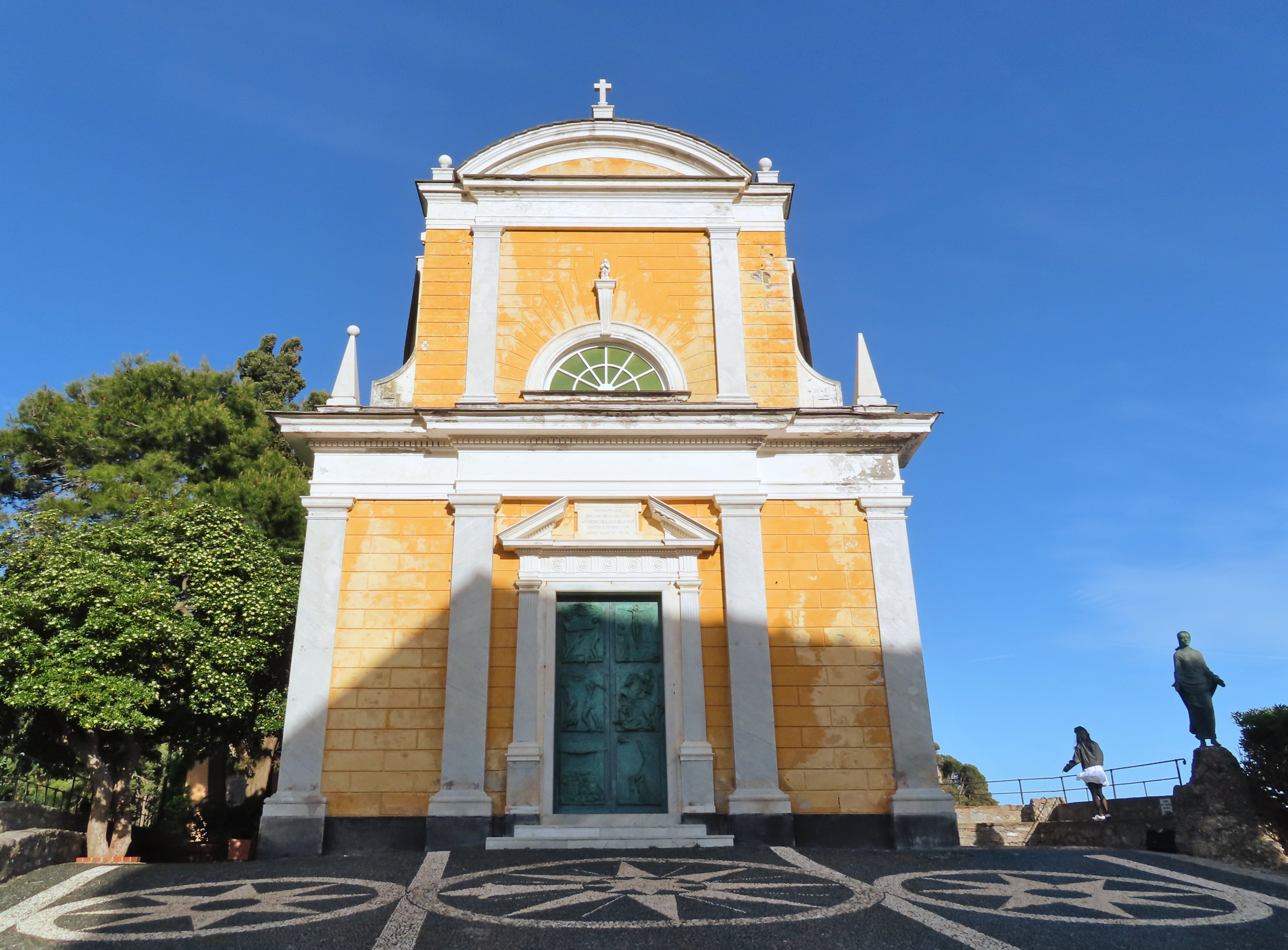

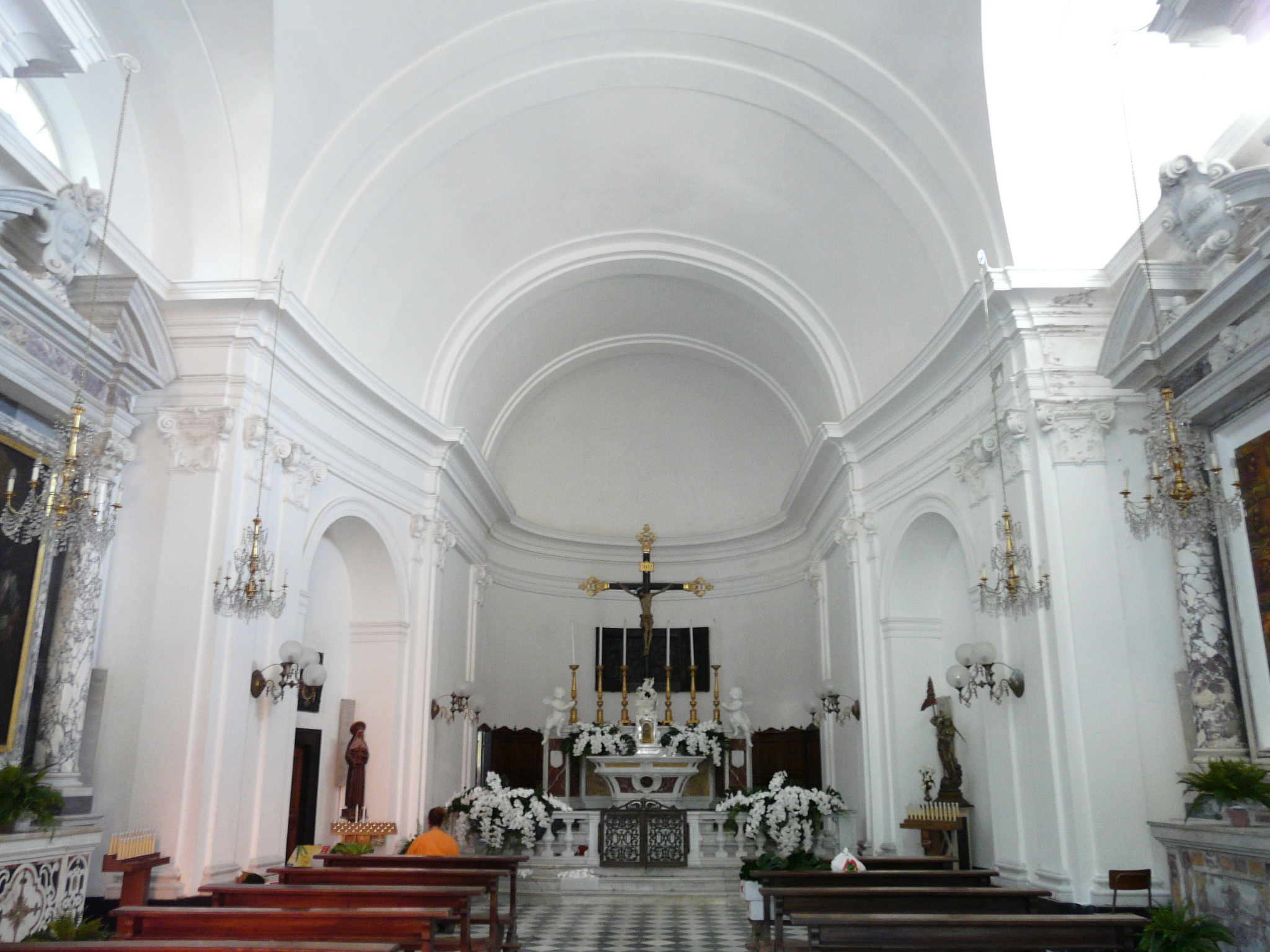

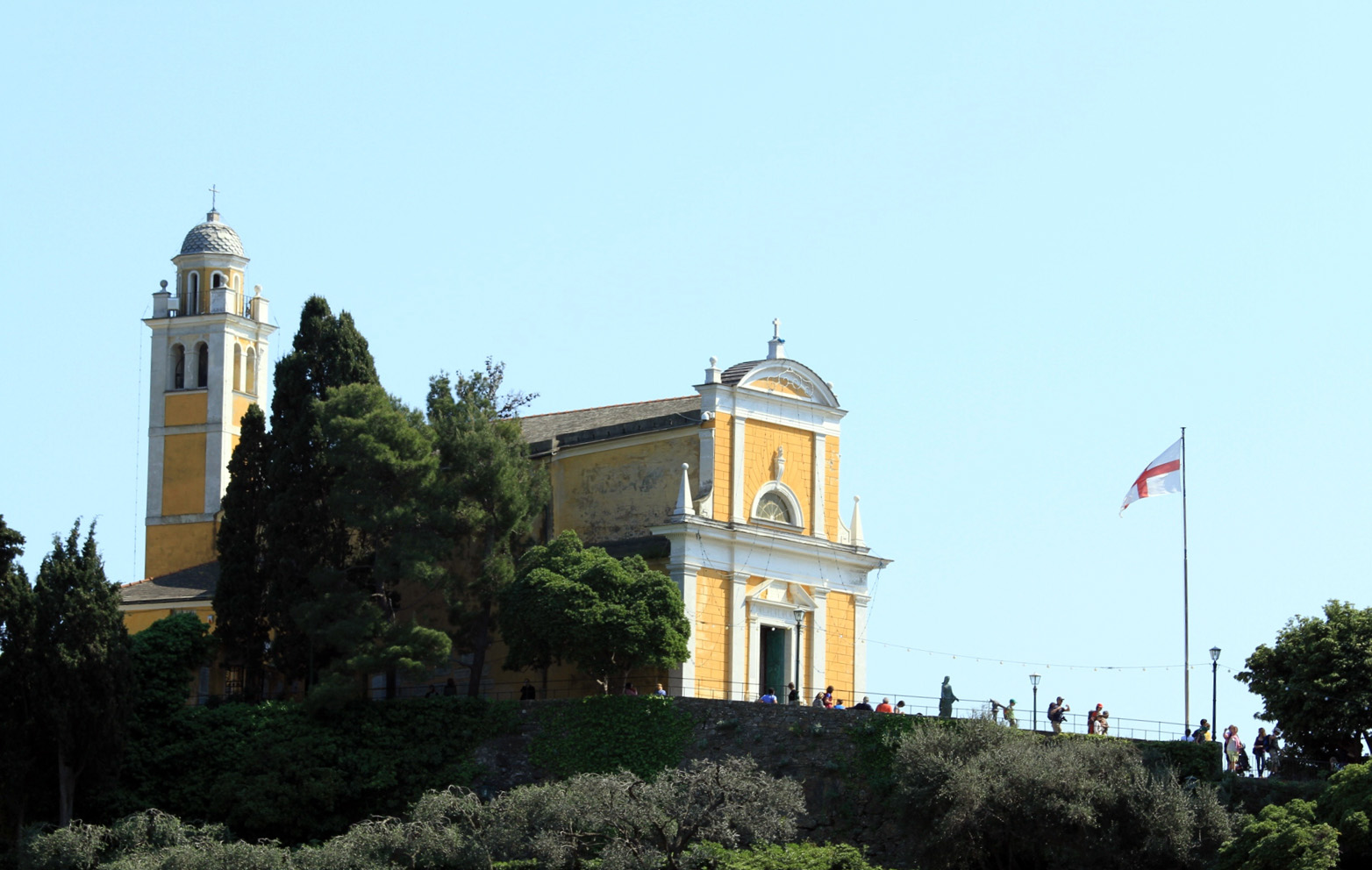
