= Richard Bunger Evans =

American composer and pianist

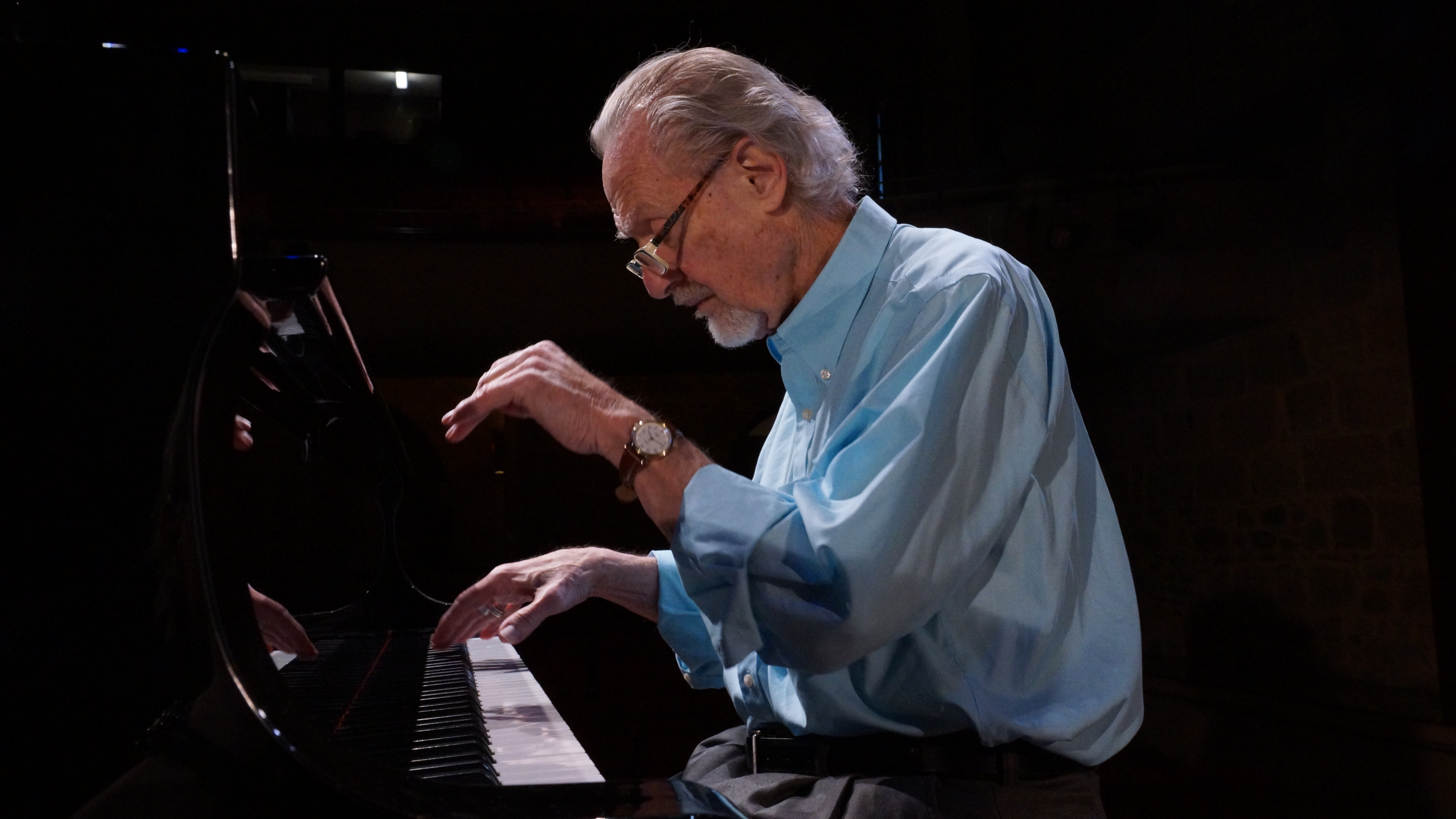
- Evans in 2017

Background information
- Also known as: Richard Bunger; Richard B. Evans
- Born: June 1, 1942; Allentown, Pennsylvania
- Died: November 27, 2025 (aged 83)
- Occupations: Composer, pianist, author
- Instrument: Piano
- Website: www.richardbevans.com

Richard Bunger Evans, also known as Richard Bunger (1942–2025) is an American composer and pianist. He has composed and performed music for opera, musical theatre, string orchestra, and chamber music, In commemoration of Ireland's 1916 Easter Rising, he composed Ireland's Poet-Patriots, an oratorio that premiered on the centenary at San Francisco's Grace Cathedral, and was performed again in October 2017 at the National Cathedral in Washington, DC. Evans also contributed music to the Ken Burns documentary miniseries, The American Revolution (2025). During his 17-year career as a music professor, he founded the first American electronic music and recording program.

== Early life and education ==
Richard Bunger Evans was born in Allentown, Pennsylvania in 1942. He lived in a children's home from birth until the age of 3. In 1945, he was adopted by Henry and Minnie Bunger of Fountain Hill, Pennsylvania, and attended public schools there until his graduation in 1960.

Evans graduated from Oberlin College where he obtained a B.Mus. in 1964. Evans continued at the University of Illinois and earned a master's degree in music in 1966.

== Career ==
During his post-graduate studies, he taught at Queens University of Charlotte. In 1968 Evans accepted a position at Oberlin Conservatory to teach music theory. He then moved to Los Angeles, California where he worked as a jazz pianist, and in 1970 accepted a professorship at California State University, Dominguez Hills (CSUDH). Here he founded and directed the Electronic Music & Recording Program (EM&R), an interdisciplinary degree program among the departments of music, physics, and media. EM&R became a prototype for similar programs across the country. Evans was named Outstanding Professor 1981–1982 of the 23-campus California State University system, as well as wrote the music and contributed to the lyric for CSUDH's alma mater.

== The Well-Prepared Piano, John Cage, and the avant-garde ==
While teaching at Queens University, Evans discovered and explored John Cage's work for prepared piano. In 1967, he met Cage at Winthrop College where they were both performing during a contemporary arts festival featuring Cage and the Merce Cunningham Dance Company. A few years later, Cage asked Evans to edit some of his early manuscripts for publication as well as record them. Evans went on to perform and record a concert of avant-garde piano works by Cage—as well as Henri Lazarof, Barney Childs, and Charles Ives—that was released as an LP by Avant Records titled The Perilous Night (1973). In 1978, he recorded many of Cage’s theretofore unpublished works at Capitol Records including Four Walls, which was released after 1985 with Cage’s blessing. Cage had long considered these expressive pieces unrepresentative of his most influential avant-garde work, but complemented Evans’s recordings and approved of their release. Evans also released Prepared Piano: The First Four Decades (1983) with the Musical Heritage Society.

Evans's performances often included lecture-demonstrations on the physical well-being of the piano, to distinguish between safe and potentially harmful avant-garde performance techniques. He brought this expertise to The Well-Prepared Piano (1973), a treatise on piano techniques for new music composition and performance written and illustrated by Evans. Cage wrote the foreword to the book, which has been repeatedly referred to by avant-garde pianists as "the classic" in the field, and which was later published in Japanese by Zen-On Music Ltd. A new and updated edition of The Well-Prepared Piano will be released by Ailouros Editions in fall 2026.

=== The Bungerack ===
In 1973, Evans devised a way for pianists to hold their music while performing pieces that require the removal of the piano's traditional music stand. Evans called his invention the "Bungerack". Evans also invented a notational system called "Musiglyph" for notating unconventional piano compositions and vocal techniques. Evans was invited to join Nicolas Slonimsky, Dane Rudhyar, and others at the April 1973 music convocation called "The Expanded Ear," which culminated in the Six-Acre Jam—a piece in which 60 musicians played at various positions among the trees on a mountain slope. In May 1973, Evans performed live in the radio studio for Charles Amirkhanian's Other Minds radio program; Evans played compositions from Cage, Henry Cowell, Harold Budd, and E. T. Paull, and a piano-and-electronic-tape duet by Morton Subotnick.

== Concert pianist ==
Throughout the 1970s and early 1980s, Evans toured North America and Europe in support of music by 20th century American composers. His concerts took him to college and university campuses, from Maine to San Diego, Toronto to Florida, as well as to Paris, Berlin, London, Oslo, and many venues between. He performed concerti as piano soloist with the National Symphony Orchestra, Denver Symphony, Berkeley Symphony, and the Ensemble Instrumental de Musique Contemporaine de Paris. Alongside the Baltimore Symphony, Evans recorded AKWAN (Columbia Masterworks), a concerto he commissioned from composer Olly Wilson with a grant from the Martha Baird Rockefeller Fund for Music.

== Composer ==
=== 1960s to 1980s ===
While accompanying vocal students as an undergraduate at Oberlin, Evans became interested in art song and began composing in that genre. His love of vocal music grew into compositions for choirs, vocal ensembles, as well as Jiuta, a style of traditional Japanese music that includes female “speech choir” with vocal solo, guitar, small drum, and recorder or shakuhachi. These have been performed widely in the US and Europe.

Evans's numerous compositions for prepared piano include hommage (1967), Three Bolts Out of the Blues (1976-77), Two Pieces for Prepared Piano (1977), as well as Money Music (1982)—a composition whose preparations include paper money and coins from various countries. While on concert tour, he recorded his compositions for piano and electronics for the BBC, Radio Oslo, ORTF, and RIAS/Radio Free Europe.

=== 1990s to 2025 ===
In 1990 Evans returned to music and added “Evans” as his surname after identifying John W.H. Evans as his birth-father, and locating his four half-siblings from his birth-father's family. He began to compose in more traditional genres such as musical theatre, opera, pop songs, and oratorio. For the 1991 Grove Play titled Tyburn Fair, Evans worked with a libretto from Bohemian Donald L. Winks to compose the oratorio, performed in July at the Bohemian Grove. In 1995 Evans composed and recorded the music for the two-hour opera,The Rising: An Irish Allegory, an oratorio based on the poetic works of William Butler Yeats, Maude Gonne, and Padraic Pearse. For his next Grove Play in 2007, Evans wrote the music to a libretto by Mark Cleary titled Leprechaun.

In May–June 1994, Evans was the musical director of A New York Romance, a one-woman performance piece set in New York City, sung and acted by Mary Setrakian. In 2000, Evans released Midas & Marigold, A Family Opera, featuring music by Evans and book and lyrics by 'vid Buttaro and Squire Fridell.

=== Ireland's Poet-Patriots ===
Evans’s “Irish Oratorio,” Ireland's Poet-Patriots: A Musical Tribute, premiered in San Francisco’s Grace Cathedral in 2016. Commissioned by Ireland’s Consul General Philip Grant to commemorate the centenary of Ireland’s historic “Easter Rising” and her fight for independence from Britain, the concert is based on Evans’s musical settings of poetic and literary works by William Butler Yeats, Maude Gonne, and Padraic Pearse and other historical Irish writers. Ireland's Poet-Patriots was performed again in 2017 in Washington D.C.’s National Cathedral, produced by the Cathedral and Debra Wakefield, and conducted by Scott Tucker. Both productions featured Irish musicians Muireann nic Amhlaoibh, Christy O’Leary, Aimée Farrell-Courtney, and Derek Ryan; musicians and vocal soloists from the US; plus a 25-voice mixed choir, a chamber orchestra of 28, pipe organ, and piano. The six noted narrators in D.C. included author Chris Matthews, publisher Patricia Harty, and Ireland’s Ambassador to the US, the Hon. Daniel Mulhall. The live 2-CD recording and libretto were released by Seacastle Music.

=== Musicals ===
In 2001, Evans moved to New York City and was selected for membership in the BMI Lehman Engel Musical Theatre Workshop. In the BMI Workshop, Evans began a musical partnership with bookwriter-lyricist Kate Hancock. Their first collaboration resulted in 2005's The Playboy of the Western World: An Irish Musical, which was adapted from John Millington Synge’s famous 1907 comedy.

In 2002 he composed the score for Thorstein Veblen's The Theory of the Leisure Class to a libretto by Charles Leipart that was presented by the National Alliance for Musical Theatre; this was recreated as a vaudeville production by Stages 2006 in Chicago and staged at the Kansas City Ballet. The musical was later rewritten by the authors, retitled as Greed is Good, and produced in 2010 by the 6th Street Playhouse in Santa Rosa, California, under the direction of Nancy Prebilich.

In November 2004, Evans took part in a collaborative composition and performance work called "Raw Impressions Musical Theater #1", with eight other composers. In 2006 Evans was commissioned by the West Bay Opera to create Enchanted April: A Lyrical New Musical based on the 1922 novel The Enchanted April by Elizabeth von Arnim. Evans in turn commissioned Charles Leipart to write the book and lyrics. The initial industry presentations of Enchanted April—directed by Annette Jolles and produced at the Chelsea Studios, New York, in March 2010—starred Rebecca Luker, Jill Paice, Robert Petkoff, and George Dvorsky. Enchanted April was further presented by the Pacific Coast Repertory Theatre in 2016, and workshopped at the Kennedy Center and Arena Stage in D.C., where it was directed by Robert Pullen and sponsored by Adrienne Arsht. It was staged again in 2017 by the San Diego State University Graduate Theatre Department and directed by Stephen Brotebeck.

On commission from the Cinnabar Theatre in California, Hancock and Evans continued their collaboration to create Coming Home: A Love Story, inspired by two plays by James M. Barrie. It was premiered by the Cinnabar in 2011.

Evans’ other musicals as composer include: Midlife! The Users’ Guide (2006), a musical review with lyrics by Frank Evans and music and additional lyrics by R. Evans; The Golden Touch: A Family Musical (2001), with book and lyrics by Maryrose Wood, commissioned and produced in NYC by the International Institute of Vocal Arts; and Hamlet's Big Holiday with bookwriter-lyricist Howard Guy Ervin.

His many compositions and musicals were further performed at Carnegie Hall, York Theatre, Irish Arts Center, Theatre at Riverside Church, Manhattan Theatre Club, New York Public Library, Broadway Theatre Institute, Provincetown Playhouse, and La MaMa.

=== Other work ===
Two of Evans’s compositions are featured in The American Revolution (2025), a documentary miniseries by filmmaker Ken Burns. To celebrate his ninth decade, Evans is also composing a series of new works reflecting his Celtic heritage. His Irish dance medley, MacIntyre Cottage, was recorded remotely during the Covid pandemic by musicians in the US, Sweden, and Ireland.

== Personal life ==
Richard Bunger located his Evans family in 1984 after almost a 20-year (pre-internet) search, and added the last name Evans to his at that time. His father John Evans had died in 1956.

Evans died from pancreatic cancer on November 27, 2025. He was survived by three grown children, three grandchildren, and his wife Debra Wakefield Evans, a television and film editor. She produced the Ireland's Poet-Patriots concert series.
