= The Enchanted April =

Novel by Elizabeth von Arnim

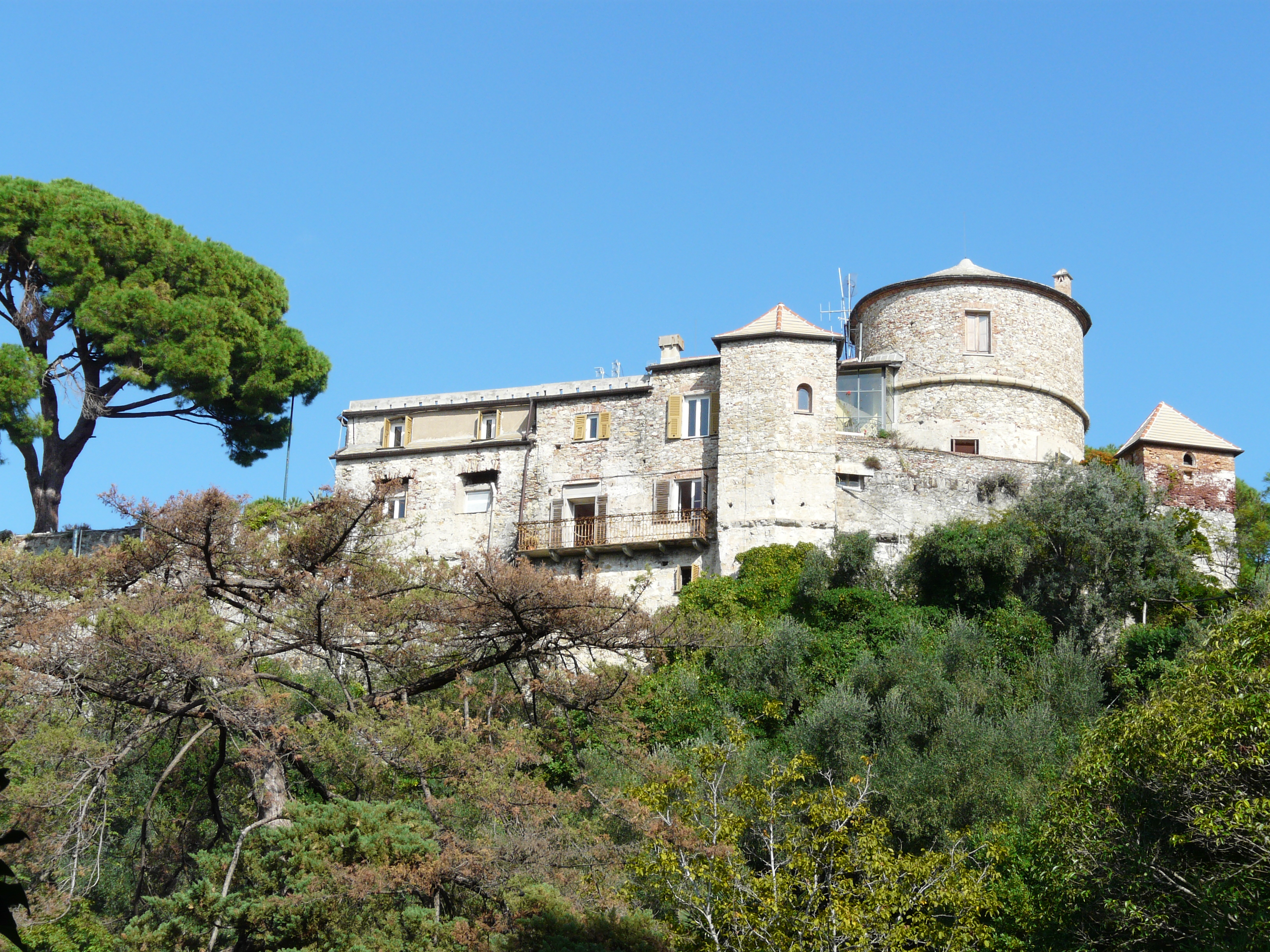
The 15th-century Castello Brown in Portofino, where von Arnim wrote and set the novel.

The Enchanted April is a 1922 novel by British-Australian writer Elizabeth von Arnim. The work was inspired by a month-long holiday to the Italian Riviera and was probably the most widely read of her novels (as an English and American best seller in 1923).

Von Arnim wrote and set the book in the 15th century Castello Brown. Critic Terence de Vere White credited The Enchanted April with making the Italian resort of Portofino fashionable.

The novel is characterised by dry, tongue-in-cheek humour, witticisms, elaborate and olfactory descriptions of the flowers, such as wisteria, and the use of free indirect discourse.

== Plot ==
The novel follows four distinctly dissimilar women in the early 1920s, who leave their rainy, grey environments (and husbands or suitors) to go on holiday in Italy, for a month of sunshine and quiet.

The novel begins in post–World War I London with Lotty Wilkins, a timid and unhappily married woman, seeing an advertisement offering a medieval castle on the Italian coast for rent during the month of April. Feeling starved of beauty and affection in her practical, emotionally distant marriage, Lotty impulsively decides she must go. Unable to afford the expense alone, she persuades Rose Arbuthnot, a pious and similarly dissatisfied acquaintance from her women's club, to share the cost.

To make the venture possible, they recruit two additional companions: Lady Caroline Dester, a beautiful, aloof socialite seeking refuge from relentless admirers, and Mrs Fisher, an elderly widow who clings to memories of the Victorian era and her famous acquaintances. The four women, strangers at first, travel to the rented castle San Salvatore.

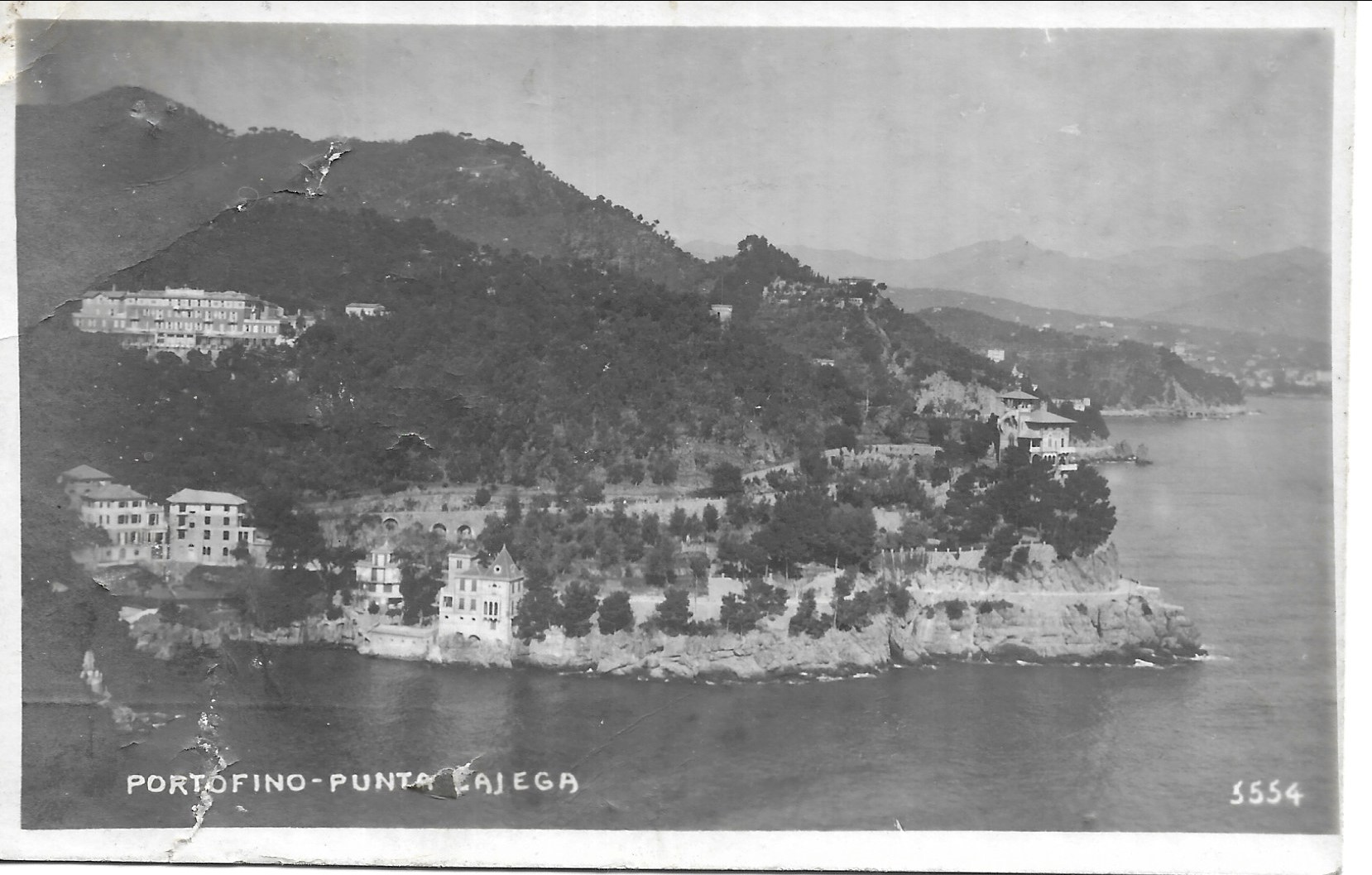
Photograph of Portofino, Italy in the 1920s.

In Italy, surrounded by wisteria, sunshine, and the sparkling Mediterranean, the oppressive constraints of their English lives begin to dissolve. The beauty and tranquility of their surroundings gradually transform them. Lotty gains confidence and warmth; Rose reconsiders her rigid moral judgments; Lady Caroline sheds her defensive detachment; and Mrs Fisher softens her authoritarian manner.

As the month progresses, the women form unexpected bonds of friendship. Their emotional renewal also affects their relationships with others, particularly their husbands, who eventually visit the castle. Misunderstandings are resolved, affections rekindled, and new possibilities for happiness emerge.

Ultimately, the novel celebrates the restorative power of beauty, friendship, and self-discovery, suggesting that a change of place, and perspective, can gently but profoundly transform lives.

== Characters ==
- Mrs Lotty Wilkins – A young housewife in her 20s who is involved in a dull marriage with her stingy lawyer husband.
- Mrs Rose Arbuthnot – A highly religious young woman, who does extensive charity work, but is married to an author of racy popular memoirs of the mistresses of kings, who neglects her, partly because of her persistent disapproval of his work.
- Lady Caroline "Scrap" Dester – A beautiful 28 year old socialite, who is tired of the burden of London society, fending off suitors, and is beginning to regard her life as shallow and empty after a man she loved died in WWI.
- Mrs Fisher – An elderly woman, snobbish and emotionally closed-off, who still clings to her youthful years in the Victorian age, regarding herself as the hostess and in control of the holiday. She prefers to live in her memories of times past rather than embracing the present and is emotionally closed-off.

== Supporting Characters ==
- Mellersh Wilkins – Lotty's husband, an ambitious striving penny pincher.
- Thomas Briggs – The young owner of the castle, who is infatuated with Lady Caroline.
- Frederick Arbuthnot – Rose's husband, an author of memoirs of the mistresses of kings.
- Dominico – The Italian caretaker/attendant of the castle San Salvatore.

== Adaptations ==
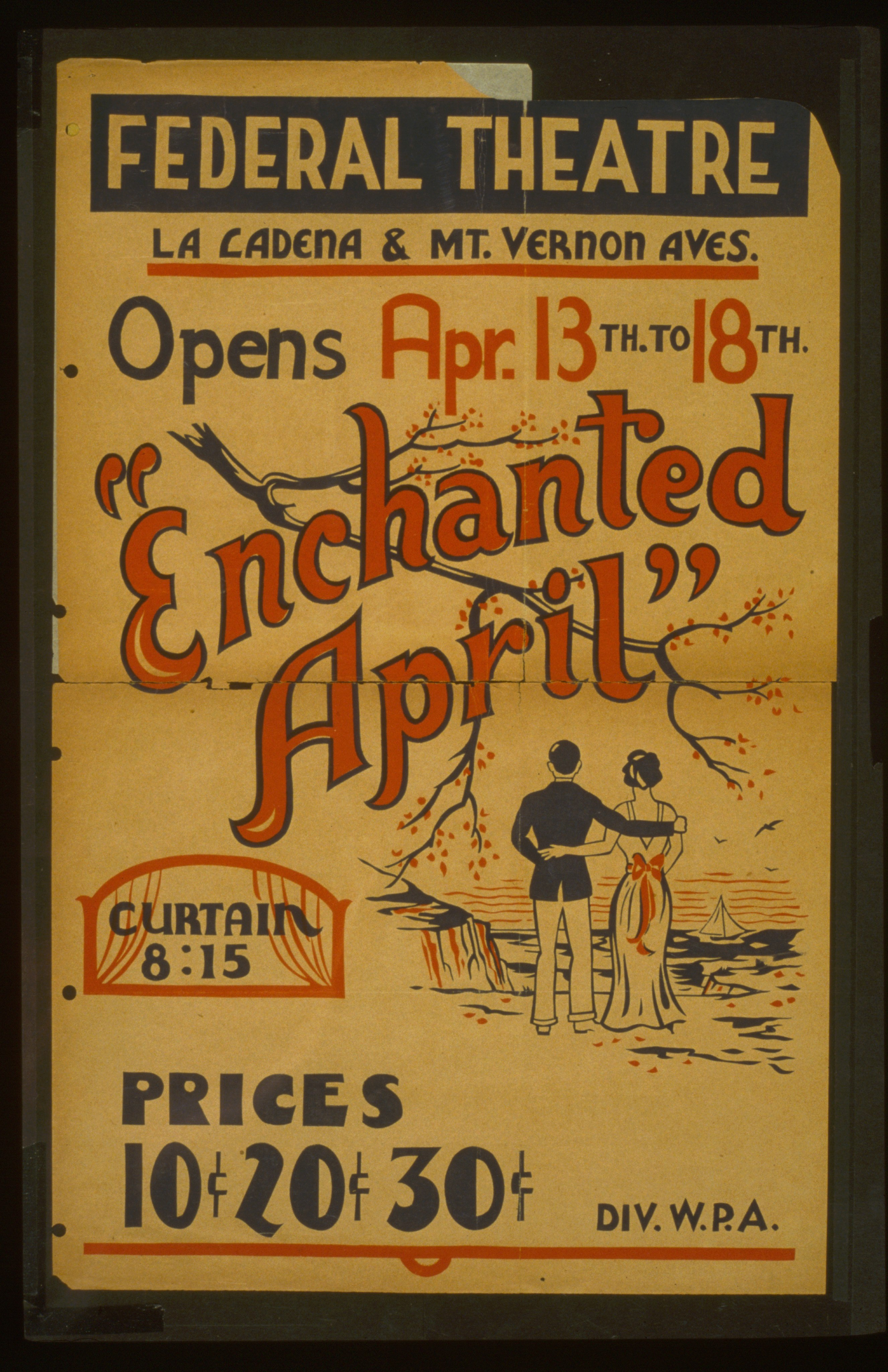
Poster for Federal Theatre Project presentation of "Enchanted April" at the Federal Theatre, La Cadena & Mt. Vernon Aves

The Enchanted April has regularly been adapted for the stage and screen:

- As a Broadway play in 1925
- A 1935 American feature film
- An Academy Award-nominated feature film in 1991 (starring Josie Lawrence, Miranda Richardson, Polly Walker, Jim Broadbent and Joan Plowright)
- A Tony Award-nominated Broadway stage play in 2003
- A musical play in 2010 by Charles Leipart and Richard Bunger Evans that premiered in Pleasanton, California April 2016
- In 2015 a serial on BBC Radio 4

== Quotations ==
...she decided pro tem, as the vicar said at meetings, to put her under the heading Nerves. It was just possible that she ought to go straight into the category Hysteria, which was often only the antechamber to Lunacy, but Mrs Arbuthnot had learned not to hurry people into their final categories, having on more than one occasion discovered with dismay that she had made a mistake; and how difficult it had been to get them out again, and how crushed she had been with the most terrible remorse.

For Mrs Arbuthnot, who had no money of her own, was obliged to live on the proceeds of Frederick's activities, and her very nest-egg was the fruit, posthumously ripened, of ancient sin. The way Frederick made his living was one of the standing distresses of her life. He wrote immensely popular memoirs, regularly, every year, of the mistresses of kings. There were in history numerous kings who had had mistresses, and there were still more numerous mistresses who had had kings; so that he had been able to publish a book of memoirs during each year of his married life, and even so there were greater further piles of these ladies waiting to be dealt with. Mrs Arbuthnot was helpless. Whether she liked it or not, she was obliged to live on the proceeds. He gave her a dreadful sofa once, after the success of his Du Barri memoir, with swollen cushions and soft, receptive lap, and it seemed to her a miserable thing that there, in her very home, should flaunt this re-incarnation of a dead old French sinner.
