= Enchanted April (play) =

Enchanted April is a 2003 stage play by Matthew Barber, adapted from Elizabeth von Arnim's 1922 novel The Enchanted April. The play opened on Broadway at the Belasco Theatre on April 29, 2003, in a production directed by Michael Wilson.

== Plot ==
Feeling lost in the shadows of marriage and forgotten in the rush of 1920s post-war society, two London housewives pool their savings to rent a villa in Italy for a ladies-only holiday away, reluctantly recruiting a pair of difficult upper-class women to share the cost and the experience. Together under the Mediterranean sun, the four women clash — and then begin to bond and bloom — until men once again upset the balance.

== Original Broadway cast ==
- Jayne Atkinson as Lotty Wilton
- Molly Ringwald as Rose Arnott
- Dagmara Dominczyk as Caroline Bramble
- Elizabeth Ashley as Mrs. Graves
- Michael Cumpsty as Mellersh Wilton
- Daniel Gerroll as Frederick Arnott
- Michael Hayden as Antony Wilding
- Patricia Conolly as Costanza

=== Recognition ===
- Outer Critics Circle Award for Outstanding New American Play
- Tony Award for Best Play nomination
- Tony Award for Best Actress in a Play (Jayne Atkinson) nomination
- Drama League Award for Distinguished Production of a Play nomination
