= Castello Brown =

Historic house museum in Portofino, Italy

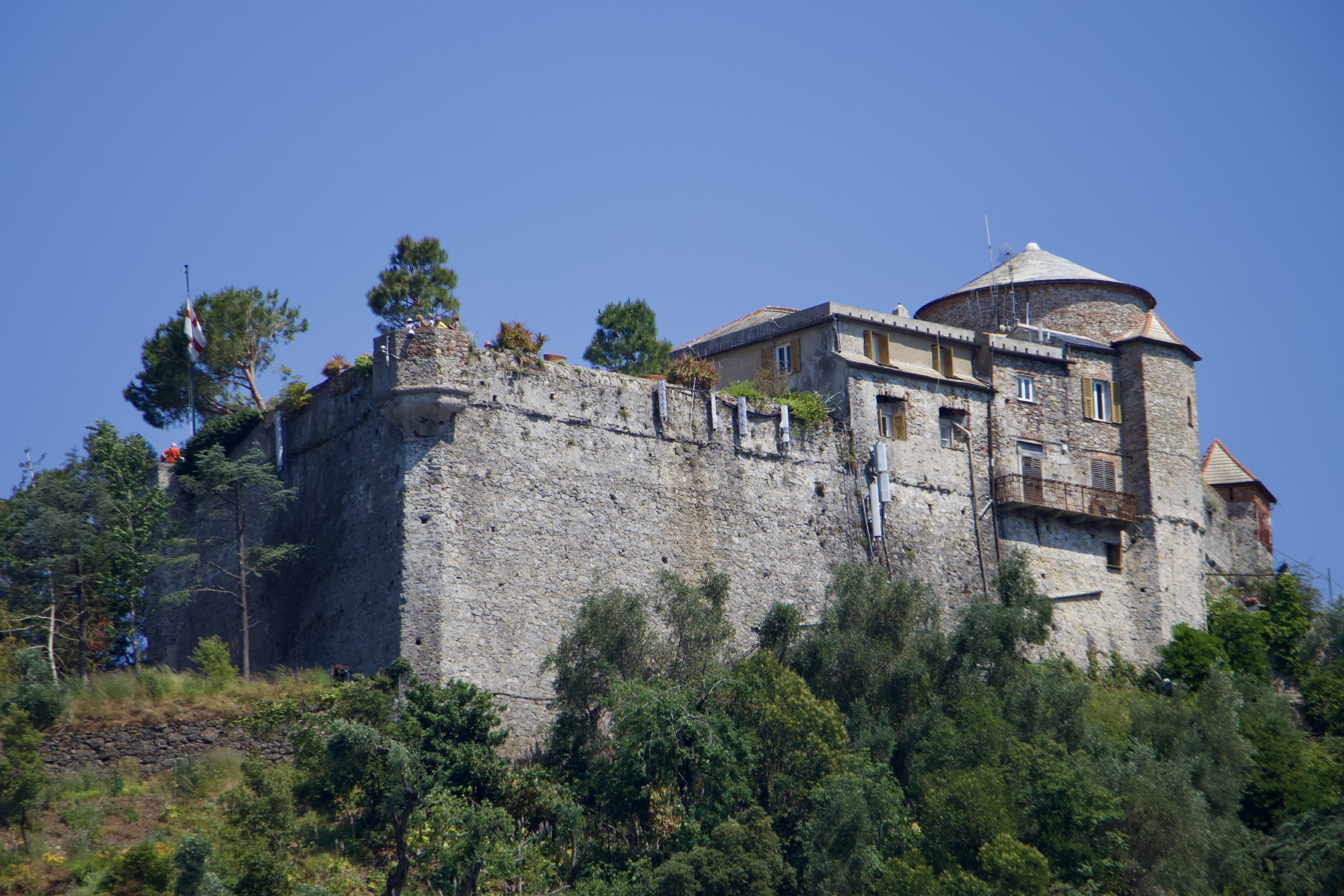
- Castello Brown, as seen from the harbour

- Location within Northern Italy
- 44°18′07.48″N 9°12′51.50″E
- Location: Via alla Penisola; 16034 Portofino, Genoa; Italy

History
- Built: 400 AD; expanded 1557; converted to villa from 1867

Site notes
- Area: Liguria
- Architect: Giovanni Maria Olgiati
- Architectural styles: Medieval military; 19th-century Romantic villa
- Owner: City of Portofino

Castello Brown is a historic house museum located above the harbour of Portofino, in northern Italy. The site has been used for military defence since Roman times. As a Genoese coastal fort, it was once called the Castello di San Giorgio.

After the region became peaceful in the early 19th century, the Castello was abandoned. Some decades later, it was purchased by the English consul, who remodelled it into a villa. His descendants held the property until 1949, when it was sold to an English couple who restored several ruined sections. In 1961, the Castello was sold to the City of Portofino, which now opens it to the public.

The castle served as the setting for Elizabeth von Arnim's 1922 novel The Enchanted April, and scenes from the 1991 film adaptation were filmed on site.

== Military history ==
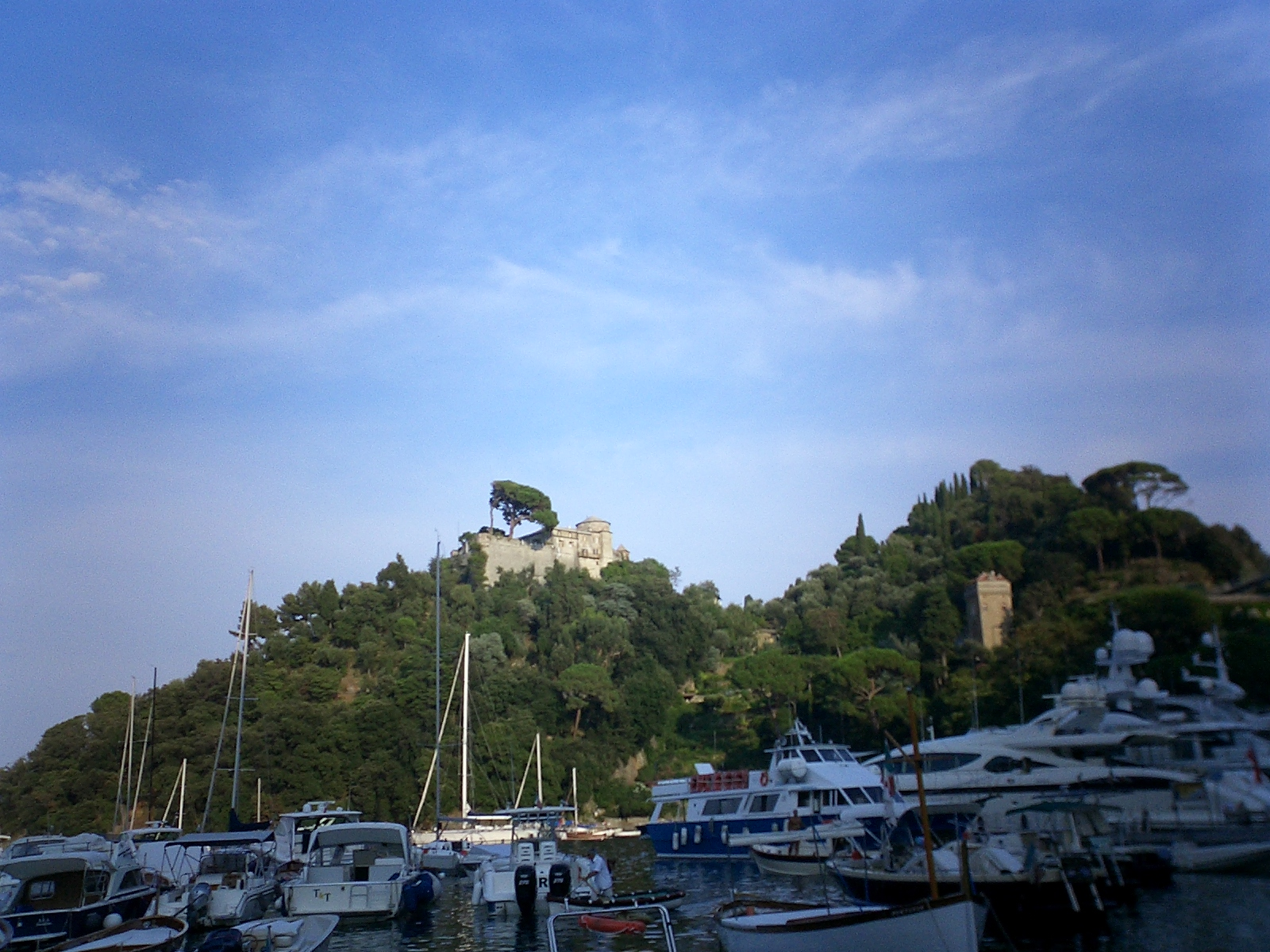
Castello Brown from the port

The castle's site is well suited for harbour defence, and appears to have been used as such since Roman times. Fortifications from the fourth century AD have been found beneath the modern structure; a castrum and a turris are recorded.

The castle continued to function as a military fortress until about 1600, then gradually became more residential. Richard the Lionheart stayed there for several days en route to the Third Crusade.

As Portofino was a significant harbour, the Castello featured in numerous naval battles between the 13th and 19th centuries. It withstood attacks by the Genoese (Ghibelline) admiral Aitone D'Oria in 1330, a Venetian fleet in 1431, and the British Navy in 1814. It was one of two key coastal fortresses of the Republic of Genoa, along with Ventimiglia, and housed a garrison led by a patrician castellano.

In 1442, the castle housed two bombards that fired stone cannonballs. According to the Genoa Record Office, cannon batteries were constructed in the early 16th century. Military engineer Giovanni Maria Olgiati drew up plans for a full fortress circa 1554. In 1575, the Castello helped repel an attack on the town by Giovanni Andrea Doria. The structure was enlarged between 1622 and 1624, and retained this form for roughly 150 years. By 1697, it housed two half-cannon and 14 other guns, and its inventory included 50 muskets along with various arquebuses, halberds, and spears.

The Republic of Genoa fell in 1797. The following year, the Castello's small tower was destroyed during an English attack on Napoleon's Ligurian Republic. Napoleon garrisoned the Castello and increased its armament to protect coastal traffic against the British fleet, which attacked again in March 1814 without success.

After the Congress of Vienna in 1815, the castle was abandoned. It was formally disarmed in 1867, shortly before being sold to the Yeats-Brown family. During the German occupation of Italy, it was used as a prison for members of the Resistance.

== Residential history ==
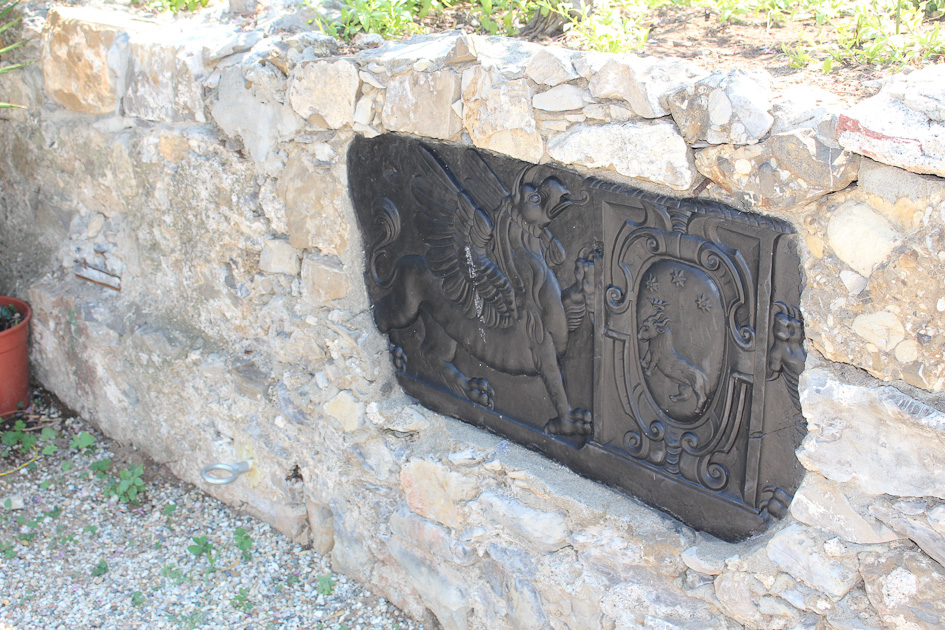
Relief set into terrace wall

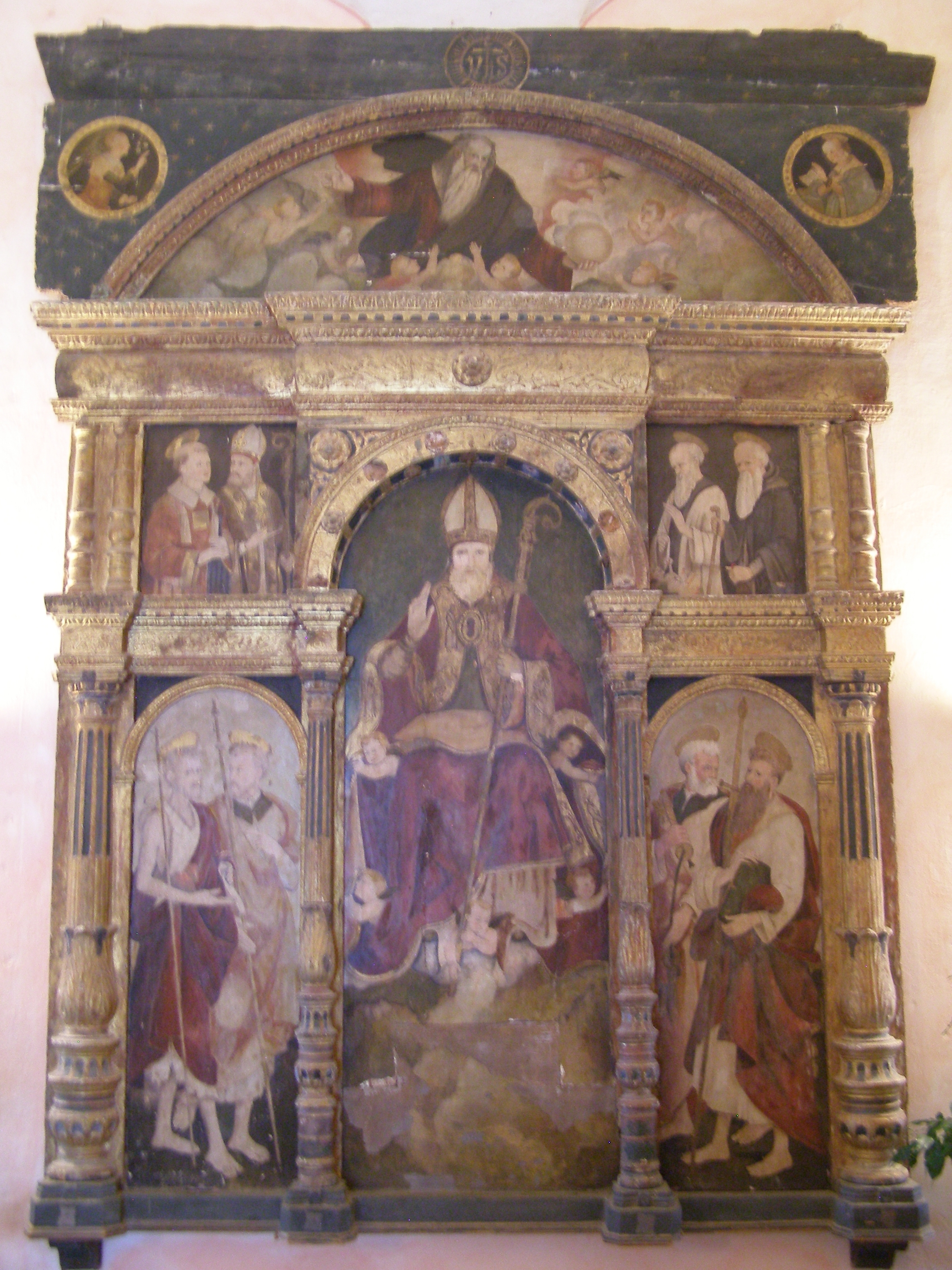
Altar piece displayed in Castello Brown (photo from 2012)

Montague Yeats-Brown purchased the Castello from the Italian State in 1870 for 7,000 lire. His father, British consul Timothy Yeats-Brown, had settled in Genoa with his family after a period in Portovenere, inspired by the Romanticism of Lord Byron and Percy Bysshe Shelley. Though British by nationality, the Yeats-Brown children regarded themselves as Genoese.

Yeats-Brown commissioned architect Alfredo D'Andrade to adapt the former fortress into a private villa, with advice from his artist friend and fellow-consul James Harris. On the terrace, formerly the battery, he planted two maritime pines that remain visible today. The interiors were furnished with items salvaged from clippers, in a restrained and formal English style. Reliefs bought from local churches are featured on the villa's interior and terraces. Artworks displayed in his study included paintings by the artist Moenis and a copy of a work by William Hogarth.

Guests at the villa included Lord Carnarvon, the Egyptologist associated with the discovery of Tutankhamun's tomb, and Baron Alfons Mumm von Schwarzenstein, a German diplomat of the G. H. Mumm champagne family. Both men owned residences nearby and maintained a friendship with Yeats-Brown. Mumm had purchased the Villa di San Giorgio, which is located next to an old fortification tower at the narrow point between the mainland and the castle peninsula, and expanded and remodelled it.

Jocelyn and Lieutenant-Colonel John Baber, CBE, purchased Castello Brown in 1949. John Baber wrote a now-rare book on medieval Portofino, while Jocelyn Baber researched the castle chapel, including a complete 1607 inventory. The Babers maintained the villa until 1961, when it was sold to the municipality of Portofino, which has since preserved it as a public museum and cultural venue.

== In popular culture ==
Elizabeth von Arnim set her 1922 novel The Enchanted April at Castello Brown. The 1991 British film adaptation, directed by Mike Newell and starring Miranda Richardson and Joan Plowright, was filmed on location at the Castello and in the surrounding area.
