= Villa Pagana =

Building in Rapallo, Italy

- Exterior of the villa
- Former names: Villa Spinola
- Alternative names: Villa dei Cavalieri di Malta; Villa Malta

General information
- Status: Intact
- Type: Villa
- Location: San Michele di Pagana, Rapallo, Metropolitan City of Genoa, Liguria, Italy, Via San Michele
- Coordinates: 44°20′8″N 9°13′25.7″E
- Completed: 17th century
- Client: Orero family
- Owner: Sovereign Military Order of Malta

Villa Pagana, formerly known as Villa Spinola, is a residential building in the frazione of San Michele di Pagana in Rapallo, within the Metropolitan City of Genoa in Italy.

It is located on Punta Pagana, close to the boundary with Santa Margherita Ligure, and it includes a private park containing the 17th-century Castello di Punta Pagana. The house has been one of the magisterial residences of the Grand Master of the Sovereign Military Order of Malta since 1959, and it is therefore locally known as the Villa dei Cavalieri di Malta or simply Villa Malta. These names are incorrect since they should be exclusively associated with the Villa del Priorato di Malta in Rome.

== History ==
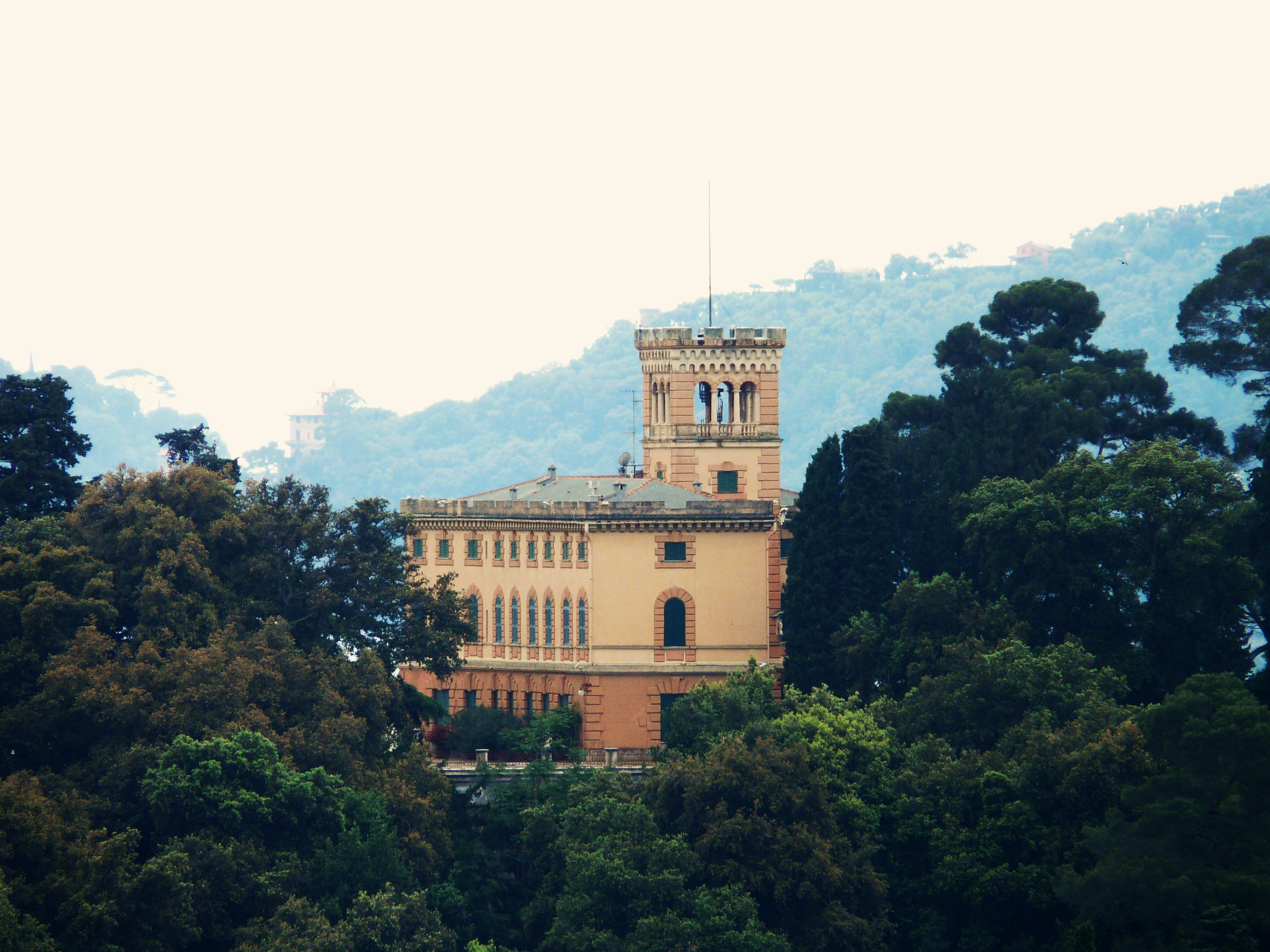
The villa from the Prelo beach of San Michele di Pagana

The construction of the villa was commissioned by the Orero family, who probably originated from the homonymous locality in the Valle Fontanabuona, in the early 17th century, after they purchased the land from the Giudice family from Rapallo. Historical documents show that the first owner was Francesco Orero.

After his death in 1609, ownership of the building passed to his sons Francesco and Bernardo, who managed and shared the entire patrimony until 1641 and extended the building to its present state. The boundaries of the property have remained almost unchanged since then. The villa was later managed by Francesco Orero, and it passed to his sons Gerolamo and Dionisio following his death in 1644. The latter's financial problems resulted in the property being sold to the Marquis Pier Francesco Cattaneo. After he died in 1708, it passed to his brother Paolo Maria Cattaneo.

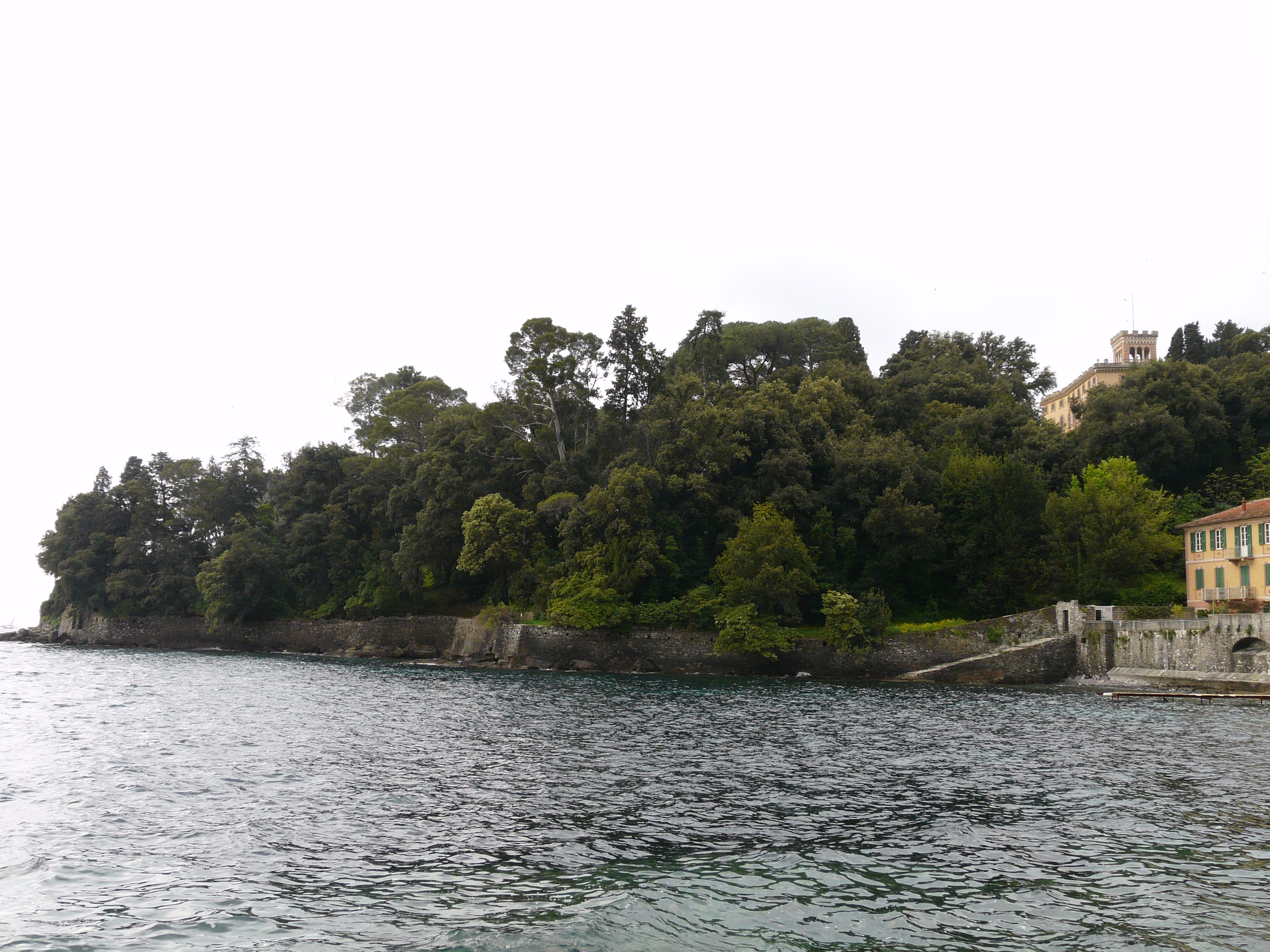
The villa's park at Punta Pagana

Through family ties, the building eventually passed from the Cattaneo to the Spinola family. The latter embellished both the villa and the surrounding park, including decorating the interior with fine furnishings and works of art, and planting trees including Cedar of Lebanon on the grounds. During this period, the building hosted a number of prominent personalities, including Ferdinand I of the Two Sicilies and his brother Giovanni in 1816, and Queen Margherita of Savoy and her brother Thomas of Savoy in the early 20th century.

In a will of 1955, Admiral Franco Spinola made a will leaving the entire property of the villa, including the castle in its grounds, to the Sovereign Military Order of Malta by 1959.

== Sources ==
- Barni, Gianluigi (1983). Storia di Rapallo e della gente del Tigullio (in Italian). Genoa: Liguria - Edizioni Sabatelli.
- Berri, Pietro (1979). Rapallo nei secoli (in Italian). Rapallo: Edizioni Ipotesi.
- Roberts, Hannah (22 June 2016). "Matthew Festing, Grand Master of the Knights of Malta". Financial Times. Archived from the original on 28 December 2017.
