= Castello di Punta Pagana =

- Part of the Castelli del Tigullio
- Rapallo, Metropolitan City of Genoa, Liguria in Italy
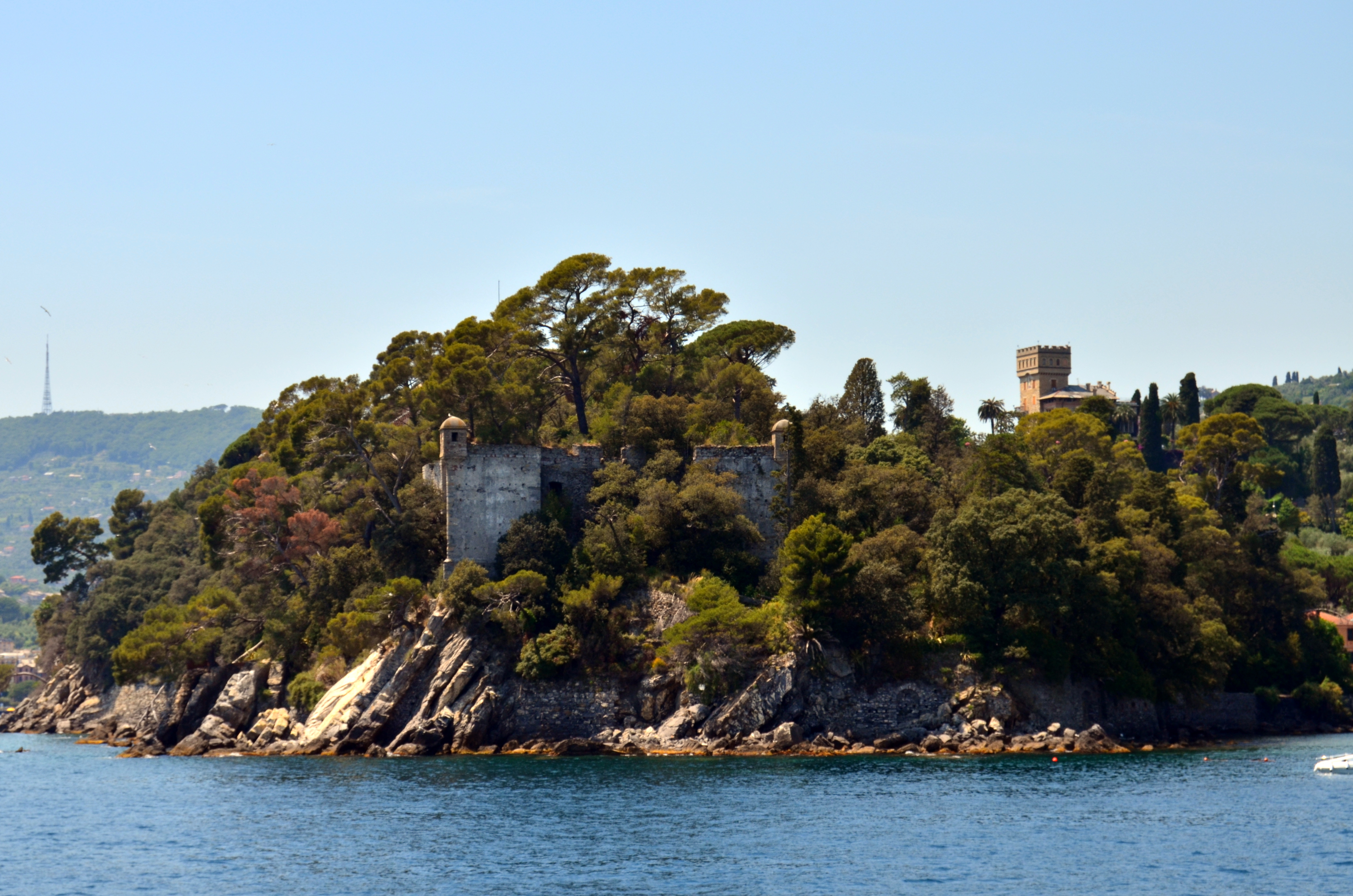
- The fort within the grounds of Villa Pagana

Site information
- Type: Fort
- Owner: Sovereign Military Order of Malta
- Open to the public: No
- Condition: Intact

Location
- Coordinates: 44°20′8″N 9°13′32″E

Site history
- Built: 1625–1631
- Built by: Republic of Genoa
- In use: 1631–1705

The Castello di Punta Pagana is a 17th-century fort located on the homonymous Punta Pagana, within the grounds of Villa Pagana in Rapallo, within the Metropolitan City of Genoa in Italy. It is located west of San Michele di Pagana, close to the boundary with Santa Margherita Ligure. The fort was originally built by the Republic of Genoa, and today it belongs to the Sovereign Military Order of Malta along with the rest of the villa.

Together with the Castello di Santa Margherita Ligure to the west and the Castello di Rapallo to the east, it formed part of the Genoese coastal defence system for the protection of villages on the western Tigullio gulf.

== History ==
Construction of the fort began in April 1625 by the Republic of Genoa, the capitaneati of Rapallo, Recco, Chiavari and the podesterie of Moneglia and Sestri Levante. Its construction became necessary due to the open hostilities between Genoa and Charles Emmanuel I, Duke of Savoy, which raised fears of a Piedmontese land or sea attack.

The fort cost over 50,000 lire, and construction work progressed rapidly thanks to new taxes that allowed for the purchase of the material and paying workers' salaries. Construction was well underway by December 1625, and the moat and drawbridge were ready by 1627. The fort was fully completed and commissioned by the Republic of Genoa on 28 July 1631. It was armed with enough weapons, ammunition and gunpowder for a sudden attack.

Fortunately for the inhabitants of the nearby village of San Michele di Pagana, the area was never attacked by pirates or enemy soldiers and the fort never saw use. In 1644, the Genoese senate ordered the castellan to abandon the fort and send all military equipment inside on a galley to Genoa.

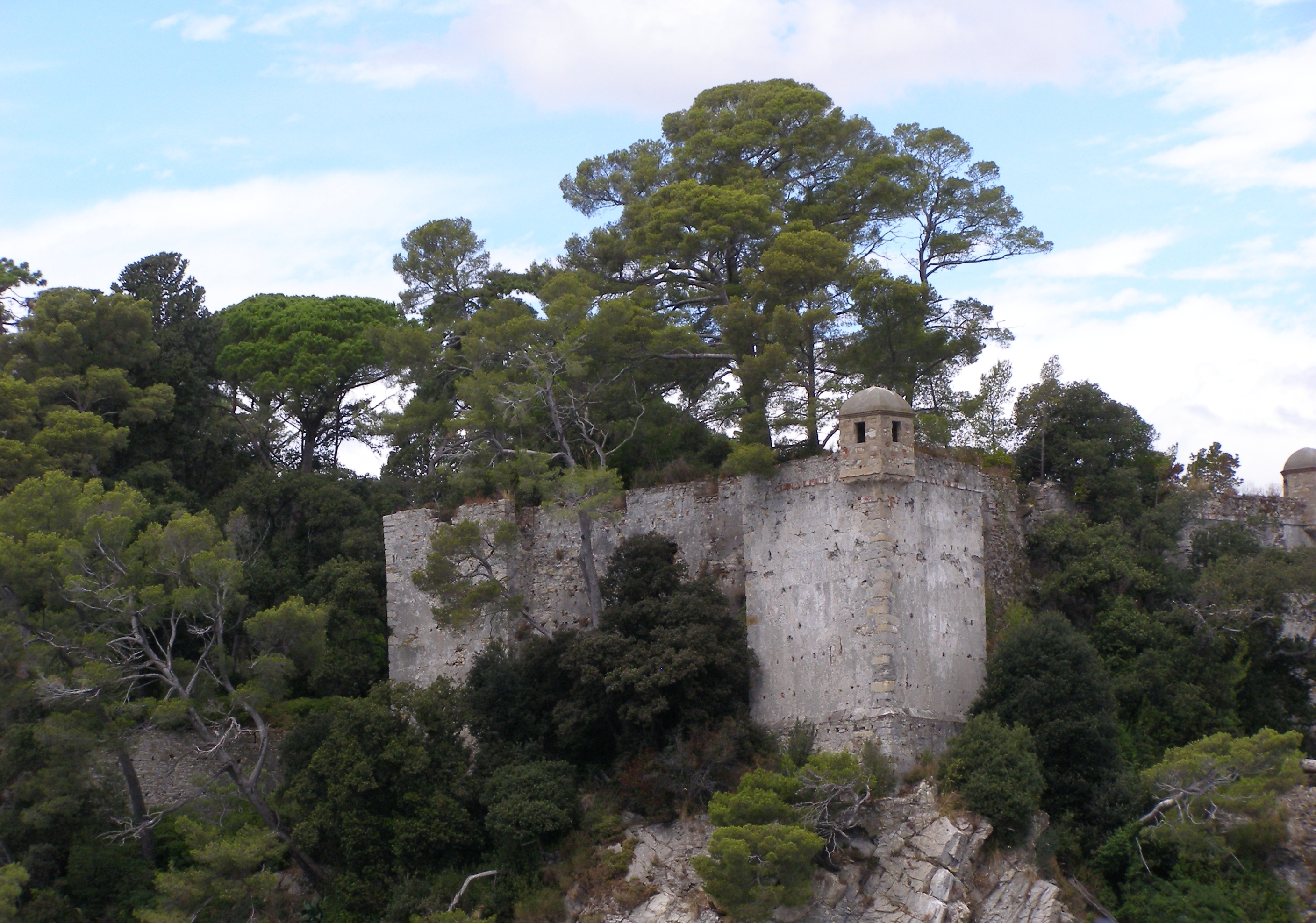
Part of the fort's walls.

The castle was subsequently garrisoned by local soldiers, and it became the headquarters of the Commissariato di Sanità di Rapallo (Health Commissariat of Rapallo). The Bombardment of Genoa by the French fleet in 1684 caused fears of another attack, so the fort was rearmed. However, no attacks occurred, and the fort was finally abandoned in 1705. It later became private property, forming part of the grounds of the nearby Villa Pagana.

The fort has belonged to the Sovereign Military Order of Malta since 1959, when the last owner of the villa passed on the entire property to the Order.

== Sources ==
- Barni, Gianluigi (1983). Storia di Rapallo e della gente del Tigullio (in Italian). Genoa: Liguria - Edizioni Sabatelli.
- Berri, Pietro (1979). Rapallo nei secoli (in Italian). Rapallo: Edizioni Ipotesi.
