= Nozarego =

- Village
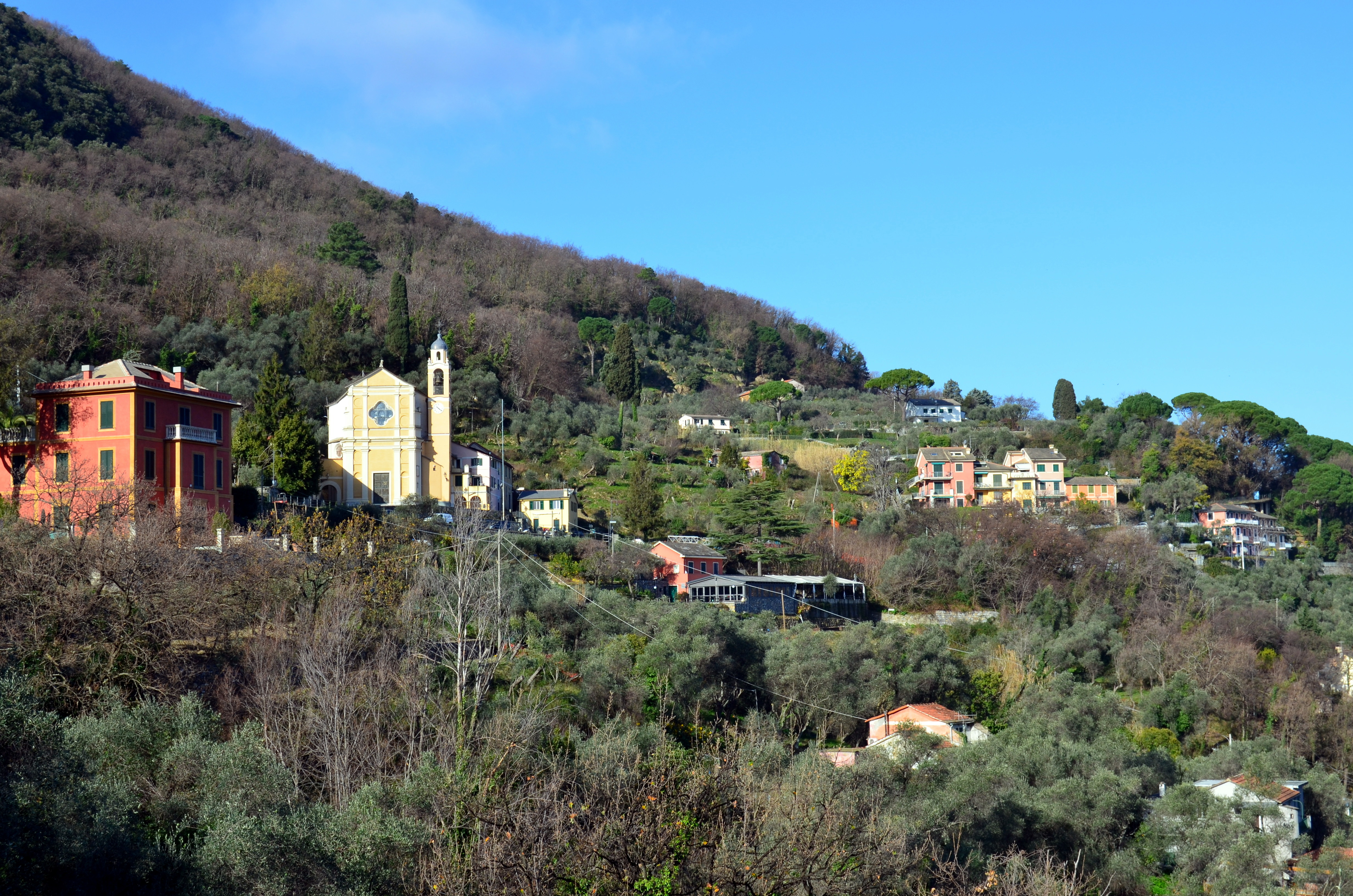
- Nozarego as viewed from the North
- Interactive map of Nozarego
- Coordinates: 51.109222793257°N 2.3656290268385°W
- Country: Italy
- Region: Liguria
- Province: Genoa
- Comune: Santa Margherita Ligure
- Elevation: 151 m (495 ft)

Population
  - Total: 22
- Postal code: 16038
- Area code: 0185

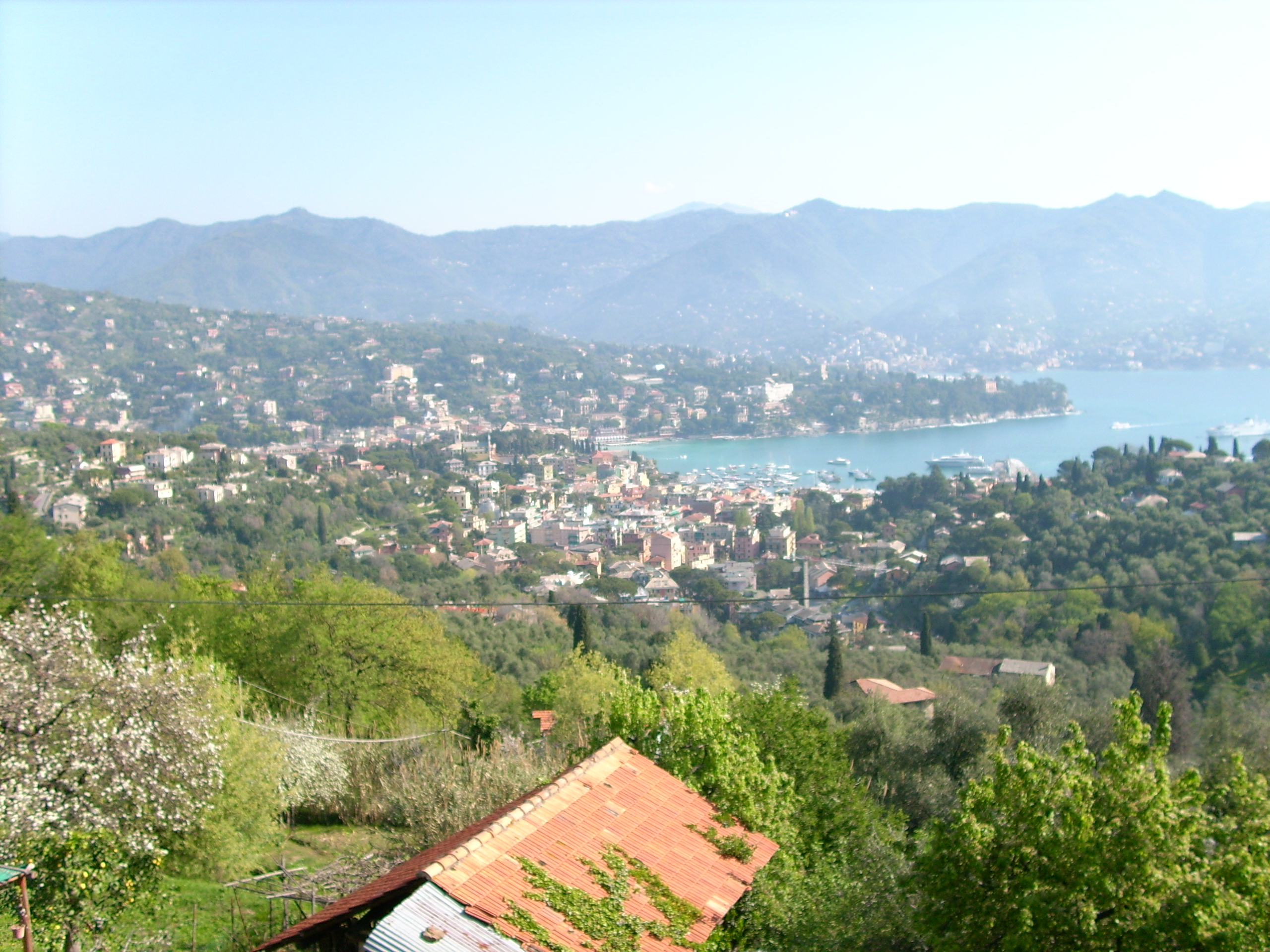
Santa Margherita itself viewed from Nozarego

Nozarego is a village in the commune of Santa Margherita Ligure in Liguria, Italy. It is a natural terrace over the Bay of Tigullio. Here there is the church of Santa Maria Assunta with a cobbled square in typical Ligurian style. From Nozarego, there are also several trails leading to the park of Portofino. Nozarego is located on a small road which runs between 2 areas of Santa Margherita. There's a much smaller slip road which comes from outside Nozarego and runs into it as well although there's no link between the 2 streets in Nozarego itself.

As of 2001 Nozarego has 22 inhabitants.

== Geography ==
Nozarego is approximately 151 metres above sea level and is about halfway up the mountain peaks which surround it. These are Monte Brano at 312 metres, slightly south of Nozarego and to the west of that, Monte Croci di Nozarego elevated at 391 metres above sea level.

=== Streams ===
No streams or Brooks pass directly through Nozarego although some come close running through channels by the nearby peaks. There are some unnamed brooks which rune from Monte Brano down towards Paraggi. Additionally some small brooks run from Croci di Nozarego merging with each other into one river, Torrenta Marta. South of Torrenta Marta there's another named stream, which also flows into Torrenta Marta. Finally some 2 small brooks flow down from Nozarego, flowing north through Montebello and ending around the harbour in Santa Margherita.

=== Roads and trails ===
Nozarego is located in a touristic are with many different hiking and walking trails running through the hills and mountains intersecting with the village. This includes the small road which runs into the town serving a church before becoming a mere path. There are paths heading north following the route of the small brook into Santa Margherita as well as another running more westerly to a different part of the town. Other trails run south towards the coast through places such as Mulini, Il Frata, Paraggi, and even down to Prato and Il Casone halfway to San Fruttoso.

== History ==
Nozarego almost followed the historical vicissitudes of today's municipal capital. Already included in the Capitaneato of Rapallo from 1608, within the Republic of Genoa, with the advent of the Napoleonic domination of the late eighteenth century (Ligurian Republic) the locality became a simple municipality - from 1798 to 1799 - of the fourth canton of San Giacomo della Court.

The municipality of Nozarego was then suppressed and incorporated into that of San Giacomo which, with the First French Empire, starting from 1812 went to constitute - together with Santa Margherita - the municipality of Porto Napoleone.

With the Kingdom of Sardinia the name changed to Santa Margherita di Rapallo and today's Santa Margherita Ligure (1864) with Nozarego to the status of a hamlet together with Paraggi and San Lorenzo della Costa.

== Monuments and buildings ==
=== Religious Architecture ===
Parish church of Santa Maria Assunta - sanctuary of Nostra Signora del Carmine and also the church of San Giacomo di Corte. the parish church of Nozarego was once yieldedto the Colombanian abbey in San Fruttuoso. Therefore, the events held here are similar to those done in San Fruttoso.

It is unknown when the original church was actually constructed but it is known to have been before the year 1000. It was founded by the Benedictine Monks who came from the nearby abbey of San Fruttoso. The parish was then governed and in the jurisdiction of the Comoglian abbey and its abbot. Pope Innocent II established the land’s jurisdiction and Pope Alexander III confirmed in 1164.

On the 8th of March 1550, Pope Julius III made a special papal decree which granted commendation to the admiral of Oneglia Andrea Doria and the parishes of Divo Martino di Portofino, San Giacomo di Corte and Nozarego. In 1602, a religious cult towards the Madonna del Carmine was spread by the church's new owners the Carmelites.

On the 24th of January 1995, the patronage of the Doria family was cancelled by decree of the Sacred Congregation of the Council. This established the passage of the parish to the archdiocese of Genoa. This was passed on with other parished in the Tigullio area and Constituted the diocese of Chiavari in 1892.

Provostery since 1919, it was erected to diocesan sanctuary on November 1, 1947.

Church of Our Lady of Suffrage is the first place of worship in the hamlet, the first information concerning the church dates back to 2 July 1413 with the election of the parish priest Don Bartolomeo Guarello. With the building of the parish church of Santa Maria Assunta, the annexed Suffrage church became a subsidiary church. The structure consists of a single rectangular hall, without decorations or pictorial representations, leaning against the main body of the parish church of Nozarego.

There are several, small chapels and other religious buildings in the area around Nozarego on many of the small paths within the mountains.

== Transportation ==
On top of the road access to the rest of Santa Margherita in the form of Villa Partigiano Berto Solimano, Nozarego has one bus stop which is served by the local bus route 877.
