= Portrait of a Lady Holding a Fan =

Painting by Artemisia Gentileschi

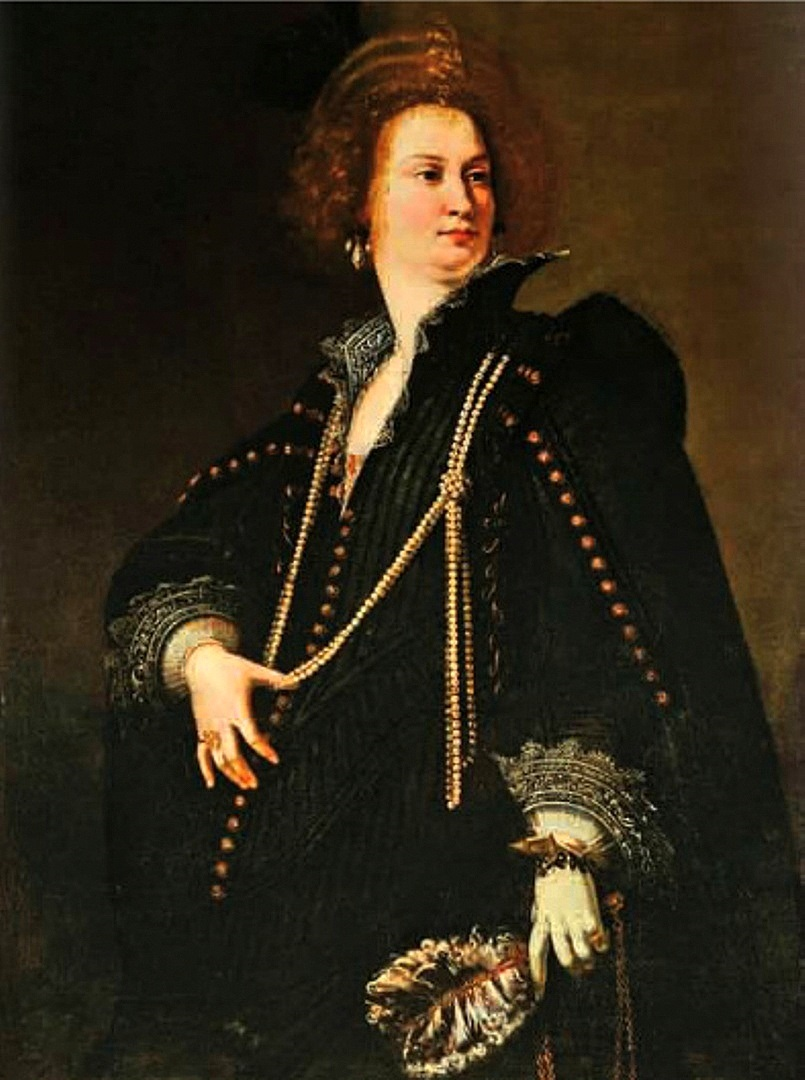
- Artist: Artemisia Gentileschi
- Year: mid-1620s
- Medium: Oil on canvas
- Dimensions: 127.5 cm × 95.3 cm (50.2 in × 37.5 in)

Portrait of a Lady Holding a Fan is a painting by the Italian artist Artemisia Gentileschi. Executed in the mid-1620s, it is part of the collection of The Sovereign Military Order of Malta. There is no firm idea who the sitter is, although some historians have wondered if the portrait is indeed a self-portrait. However, given the rich clothing and jewellery of the sitter, this is unlikely.

== Description ==
The painting depicts a woman in three-quarter view, standing at an angle to the viewer. She is attired in a high-necked black gown in the Genoese fashion, trimmed with gold buttons and lace. Her right hand rests on a long string of pearls that fall to her waist, which her gloved left hand holds an ostrich-feather fan. Her jewelry and pose portray a woman of wealth and status.

== Provenance ==
Art historians first identified the painting as being by Artemisia's father, Orazio, probably based on descriptions of the painting in eighteenth-century inventories. Others have seen both the hand of father and daughter, but there is now consensus that the painting is solely by Artemisia. The confident pose of the and luxurious black costume evoke the portraits done by Anthony van Dyck and Pieter Paul Rubens in Genoa at the same time, but there is no evidence to suggest Artemisia visited the city. Artemisia did have personal connections in Genoa and this portrait may represent an attempt to secure patronage from its wealthy elite.

The painting was documented as being in the collection of the aristocratic Balbi family by 1682. It passed through the descendants of the Balbi and Spinola families to Admiral Franco Spinola, who along with his property at Villa Pagana, bequeathed it to its present owners in 1959.

== See also ==
- List of works by Artemisia Gentileschi
