= Paraggi Castle =

Building in Santa Margherita Ligure, Italy

- Castello di Paraggi
- Paraggi, Liguria, Italy
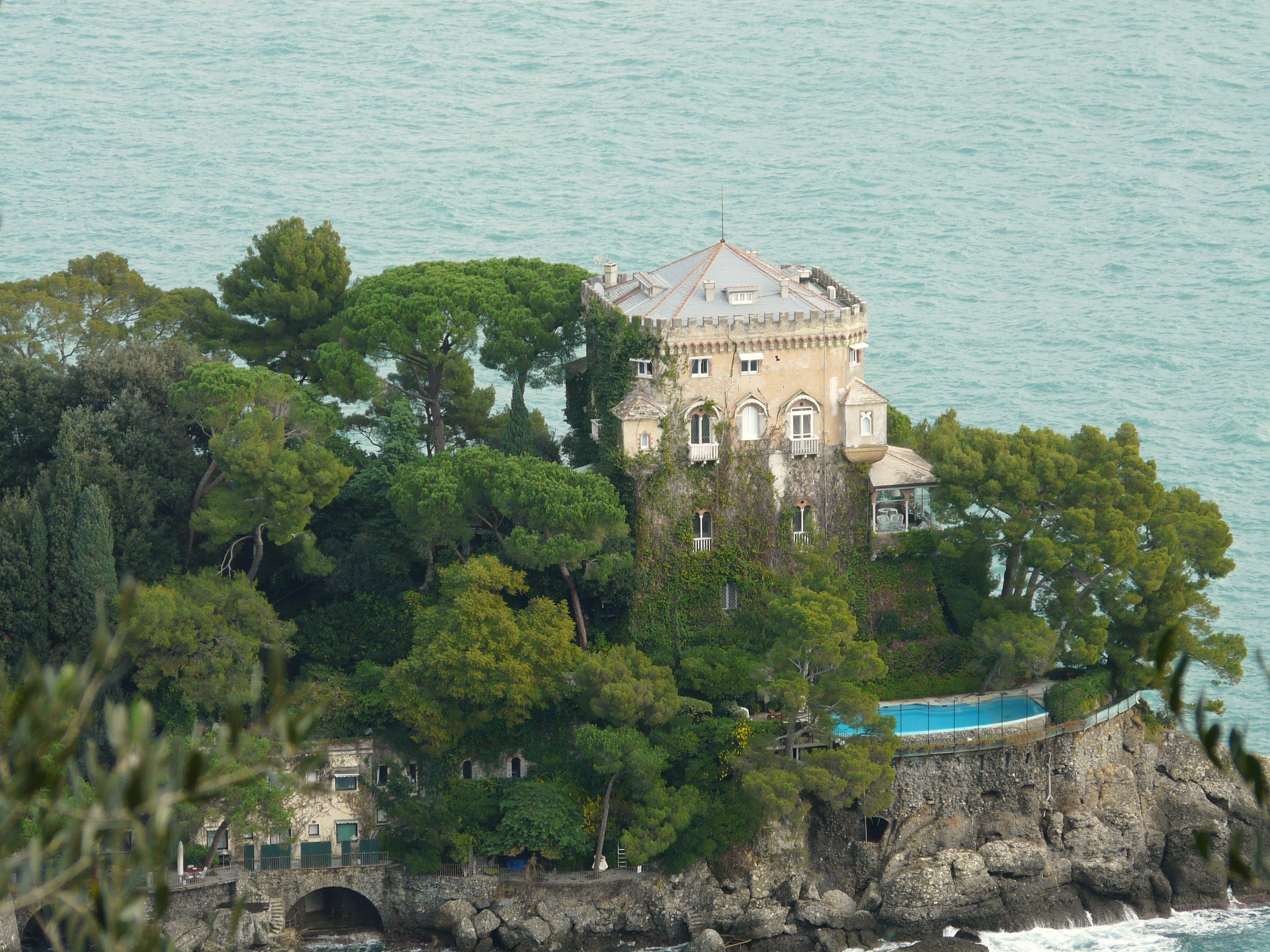
- Paraggi Castle

Site information
- Type: Castle

Location
- Coordinates: 44°18′38.06″N 9°12′46.64″E

Paraggi Castle (Italian: Castello di Paraggi) is a castle located in Paraggi, Liguria, Italy.

== History ==
The castle was built at the time of the Republic of Genoa to protect the coast of the Tigullio area. Some sources indicate 1626 as the year when its construction was decided. The castle was occupied by Napoleonic forces between 1812 and 1814, at the time of the First French Empire. The structure, which underwent several changes across the centuries, later became a private residence. In the 1990s, the then owners, the Bonomi Bolchini family, rented the property to Silvio Berlusconi.

== Description ==
The castle is located on a small promontory that delimitates the eastern side of the bay of Paraggi, and lies within the comune of Santa Margherita Ligure along the road to Portofino.

== Gallery ==
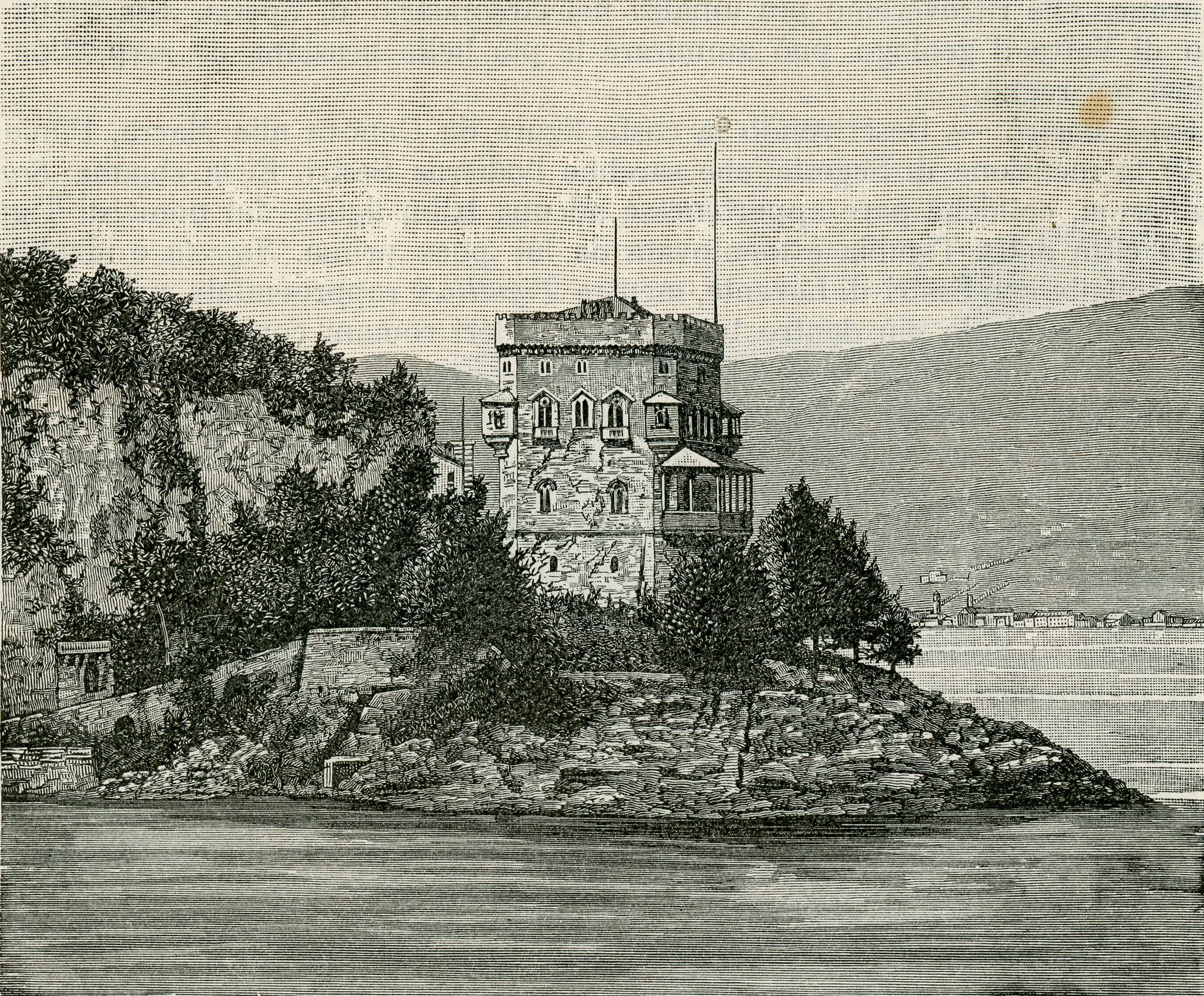

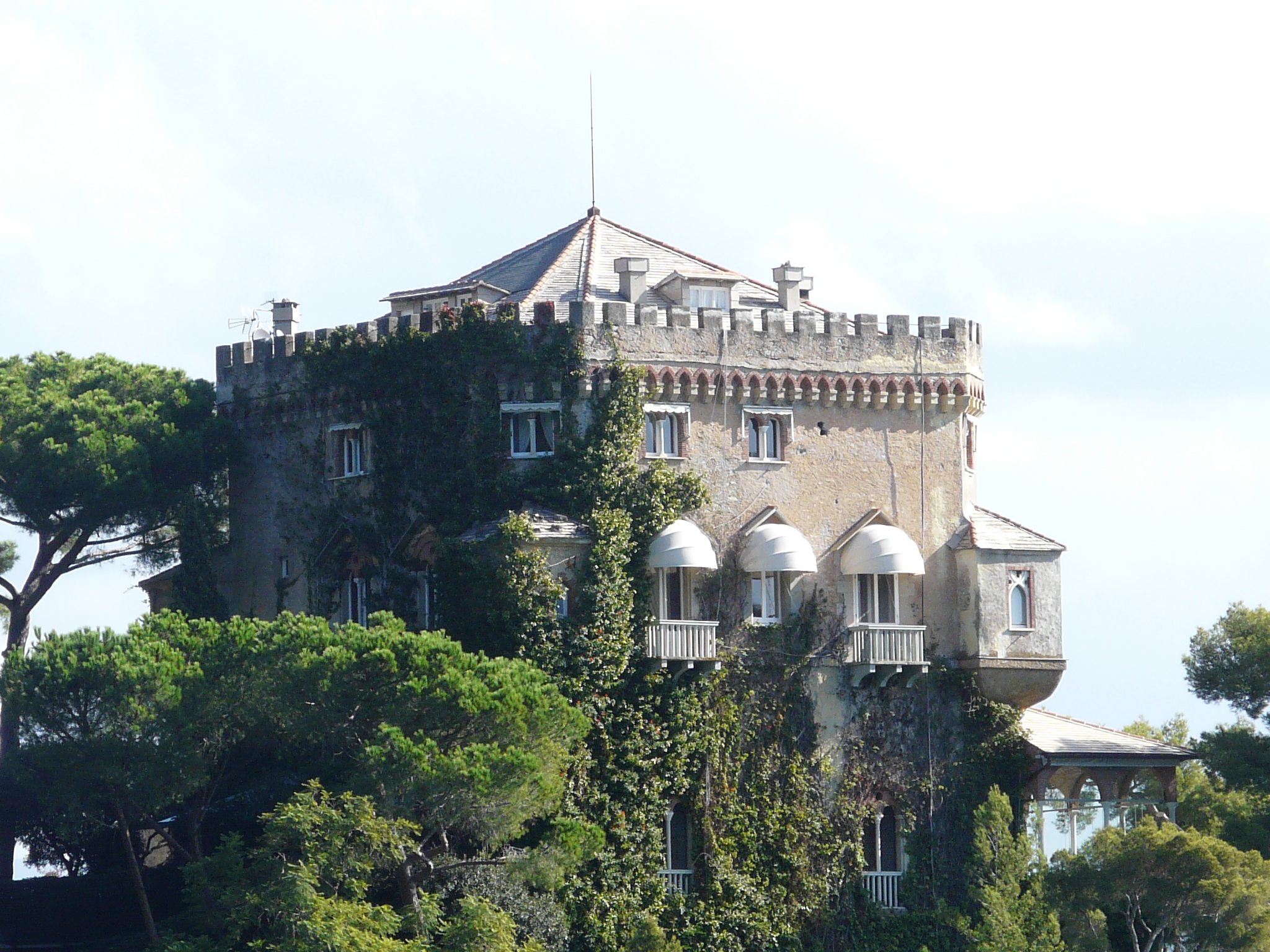

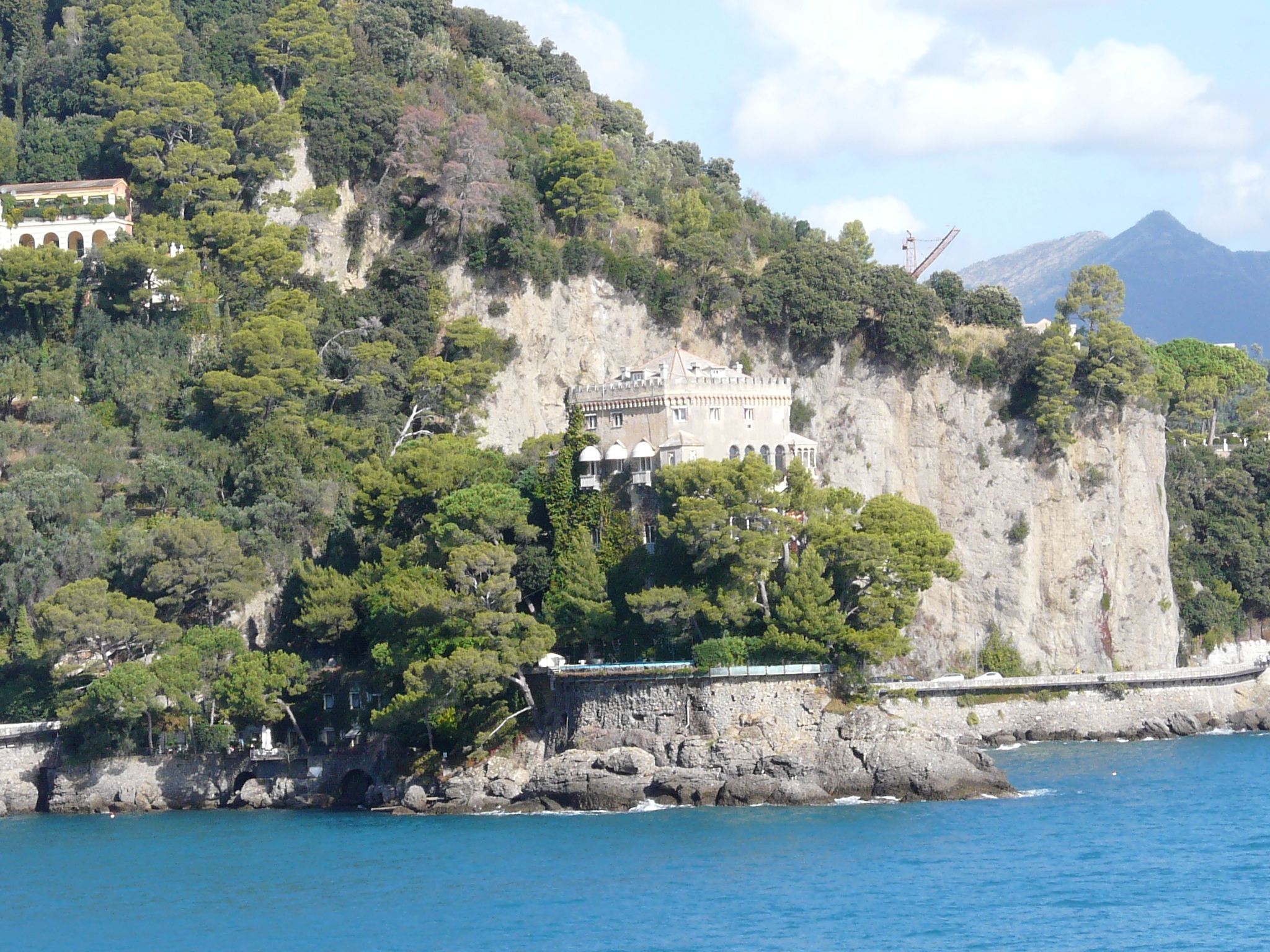
