= San Michele di Pagana =

- Frazione
- Comune di Leivi
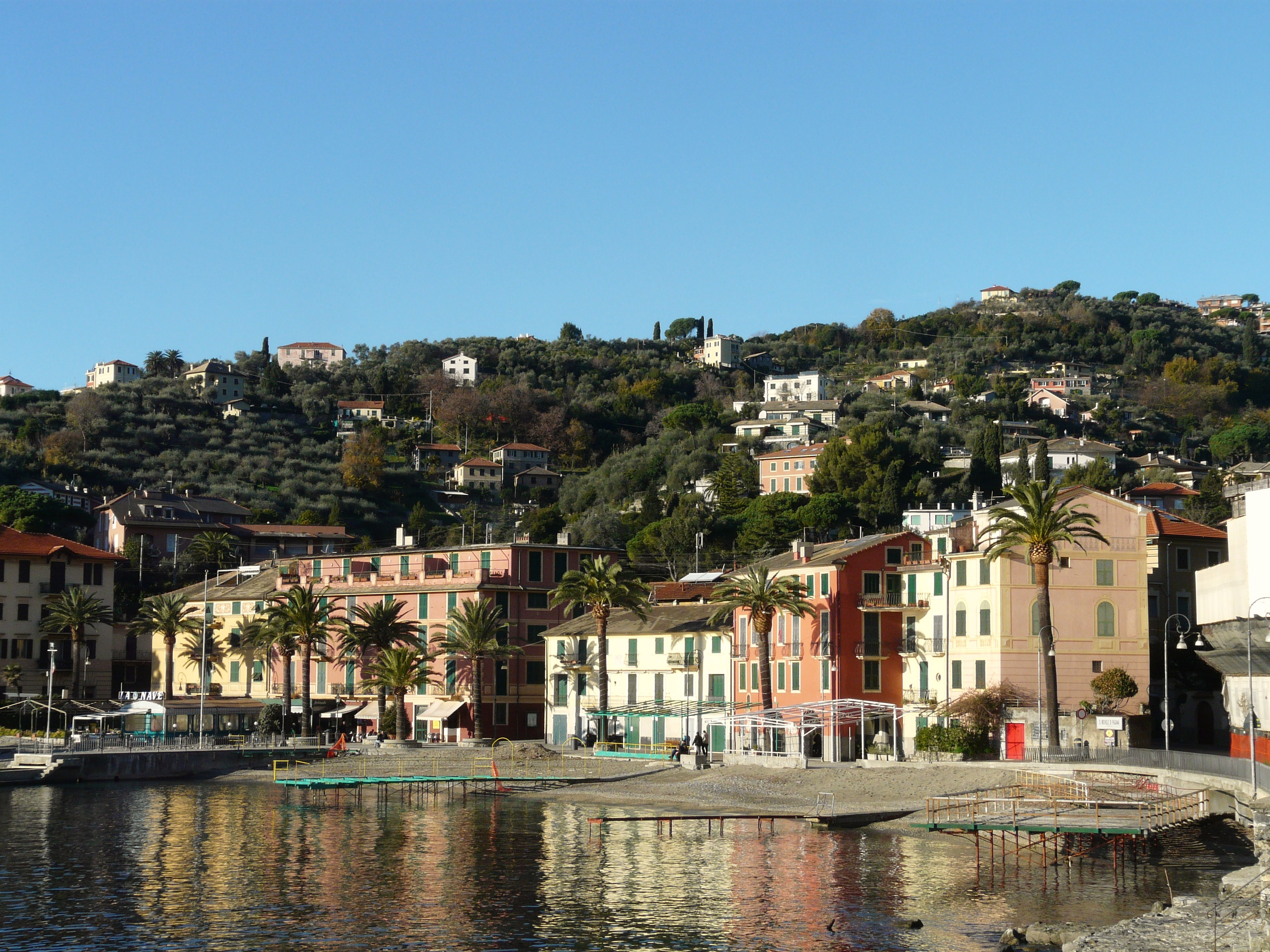

- Location of San Michele di Pagana in Italy
- Coordinates: 44°20′27.67″N 9°13′25.41″E
- Country: Italy
- Region: Liguria
- Metropolitan city: Genoa (GE)
- Comune: Rapallo
- Elevation: 0–25 m (0–82 ft)
- Demonym: Sanmichelini
- Time zone: UTC+1 (CET)
  - Summer (DST): UTC+2 (CEST)
- Postal code: 16035
- Dialing code: 0185
- Patron saint: St. Michael Archangel
- Saint day: 29 September
- Website: Official website

San Michele di Pagana is a frazione (hamlet) of the comune of Rapallo, Metropolitan City of Genoa, Liguria, northern Italy. Facing the Gulf of Tigullio, it is located some 2 km from the center of the municipality and from the nearby comune of Santa Margherita Ligure.

Prominent features in the village include the parish church of San Michele Arcangelo and the 17th century Castle of Punta Pagana.
