= Castello di Santa Margherita Ligure =

- Part of the Castelli del Tigullio
- Santa Margherita Ligure, Metropolitan City of Genoa, Liguria in Italy
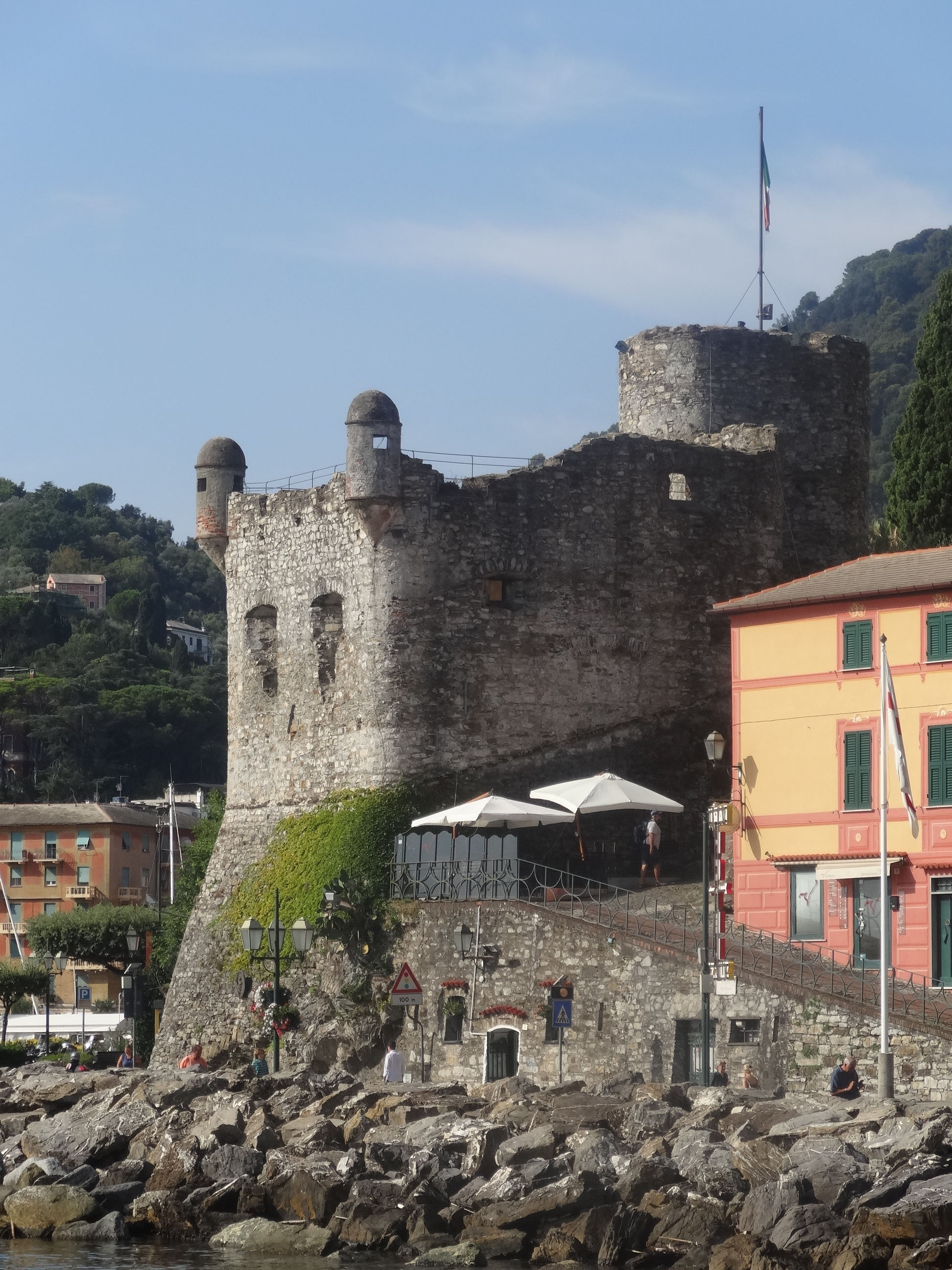
- View of the castle

Site information
- Type: Castle
- Owner: Comune di Santa Margherita Ligure
- Open to the public: Yes
- Condition: Intact

Location
- Coordinates: 44°19′56.7″N 9°12′50.3″E

Site history
- Built: 1550–17th century
- Built by: Republic of Genoa
- In use: 16th–18th centuries

The Castello di Santa Margherita Ligure is a 16th-century fortress in Santa Margherita Ligure, within the Metropolitan City of Genoa in Italy.

== History ==
The fortress is located at the foot of a hill on which the Villa Durazzo-Centurione now stands. It was built following a resolution by the Senate of the Republic of Genoa in 1550, and it was meant to defend against raids from the Barbary pirates. It was designed by Antonio de Càrabo, who was also responsible for the construction of the Castello di Rapallo

Construction began in 1550 and it was completed by September of the same year. Various structural interventions and armament upgrades took place until the early 17th century. After pirate attacks ceased in the 18th century, the fort lost its military importance and only some repair and maintenance works were undertaken.

In the 19th century, there were plans to demolish the building twice: first to build a new municipal building after Rapallo was established as an independent municipality, and then to enlarge the adjacent Calata Vittorio Emanuele. It was restored after World War I and it was dedicated in the memory of the fallen in that war.

== Gallery ==
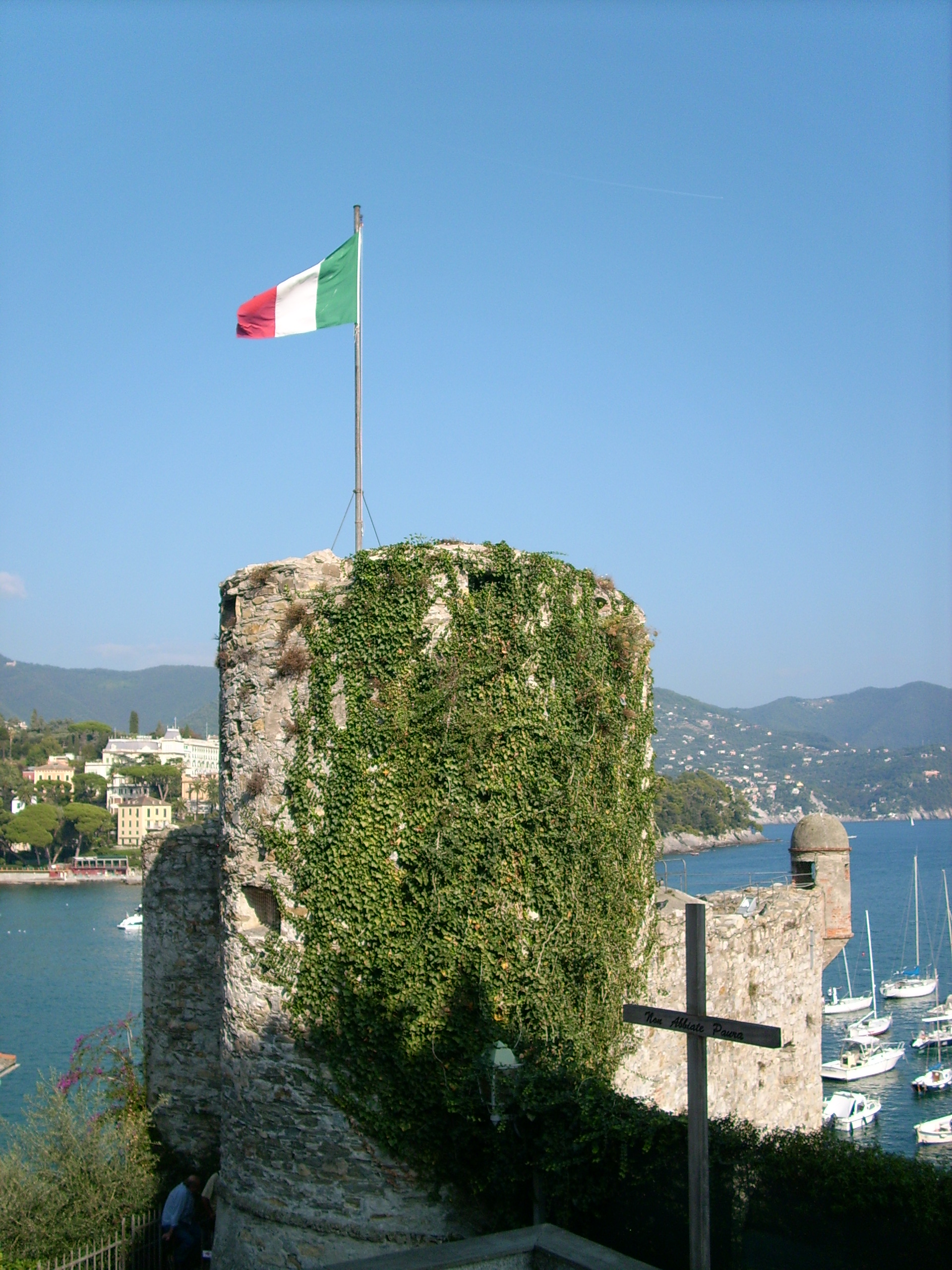
Tower

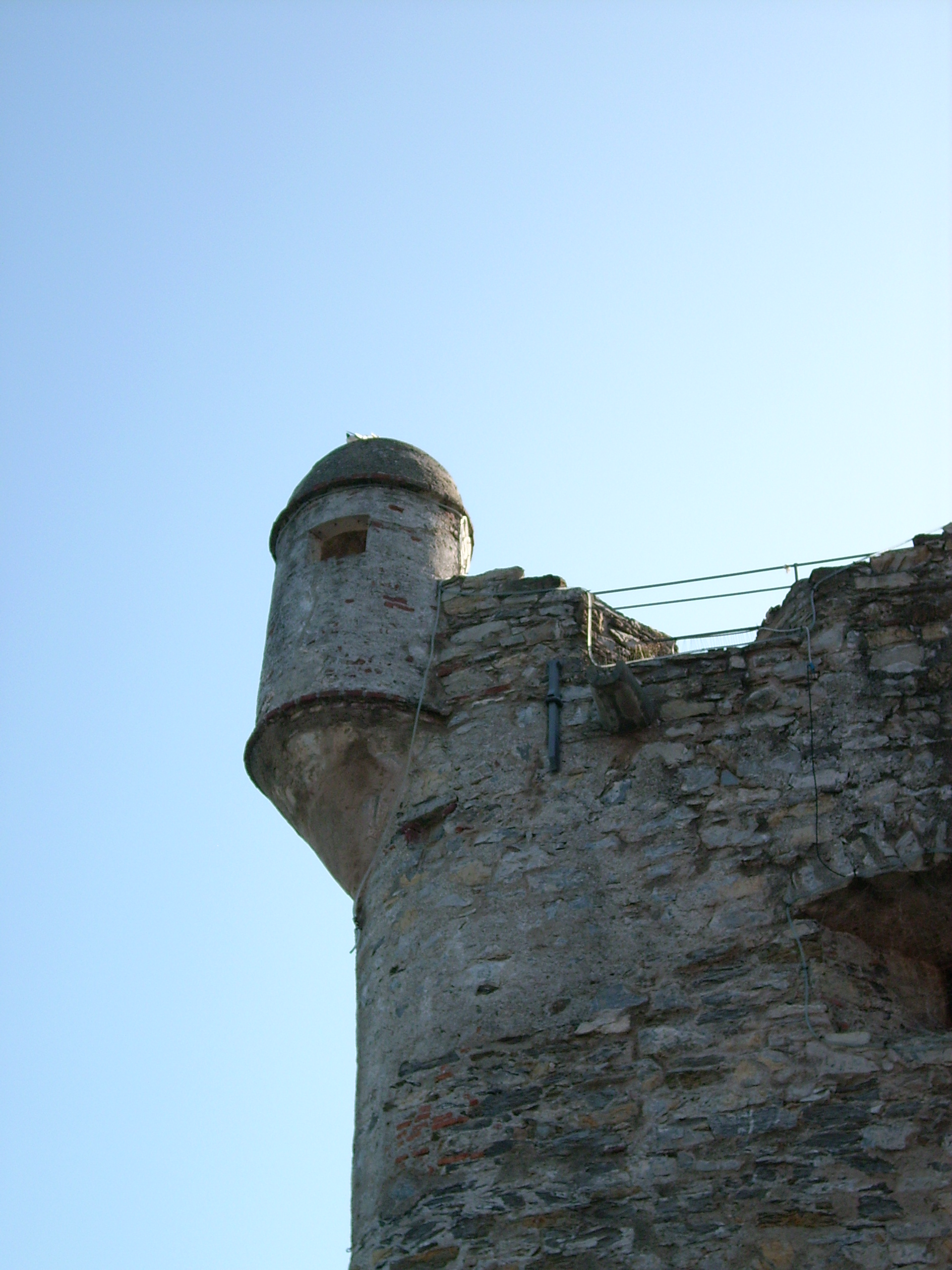
Guerite

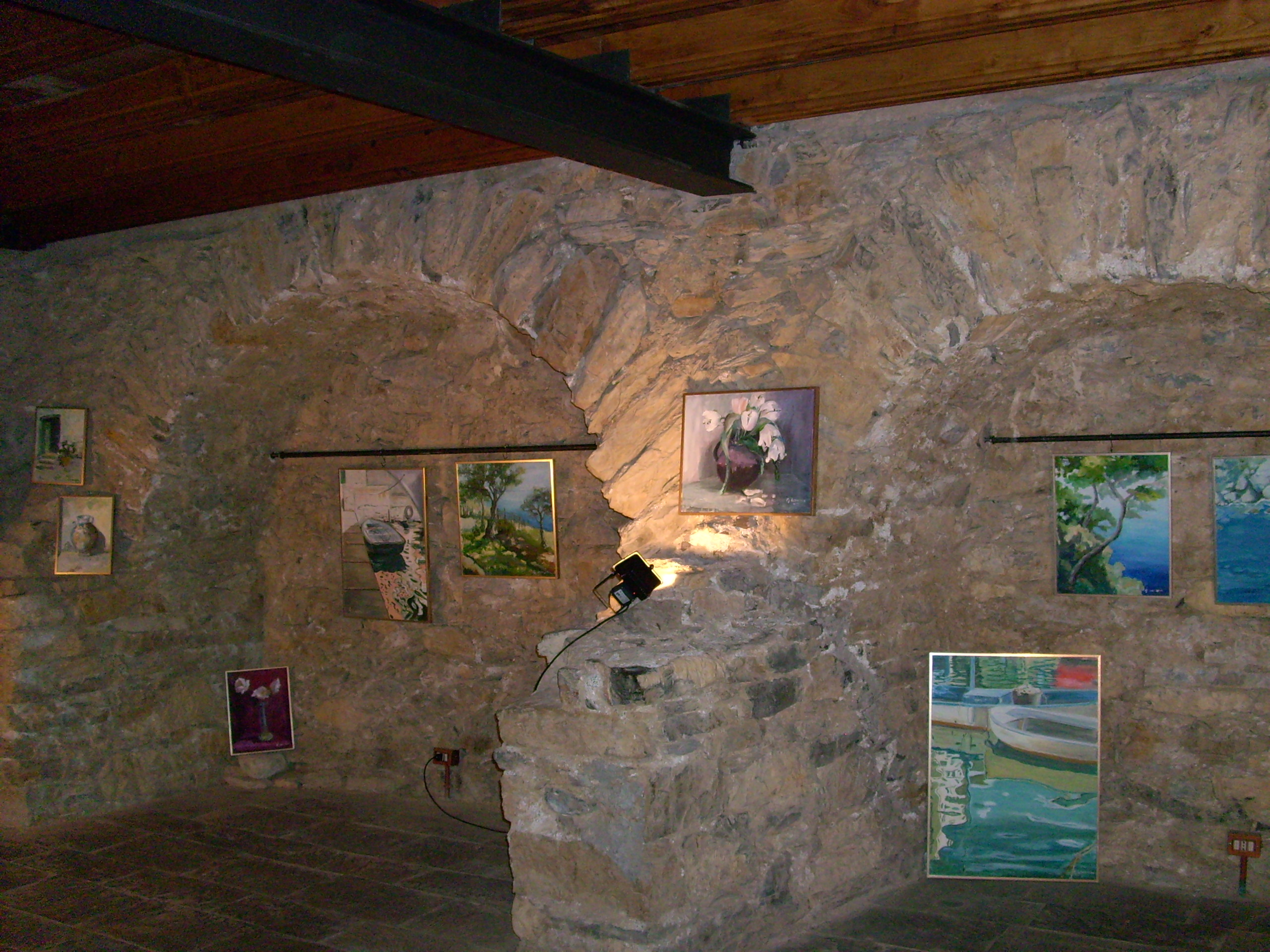
Interior

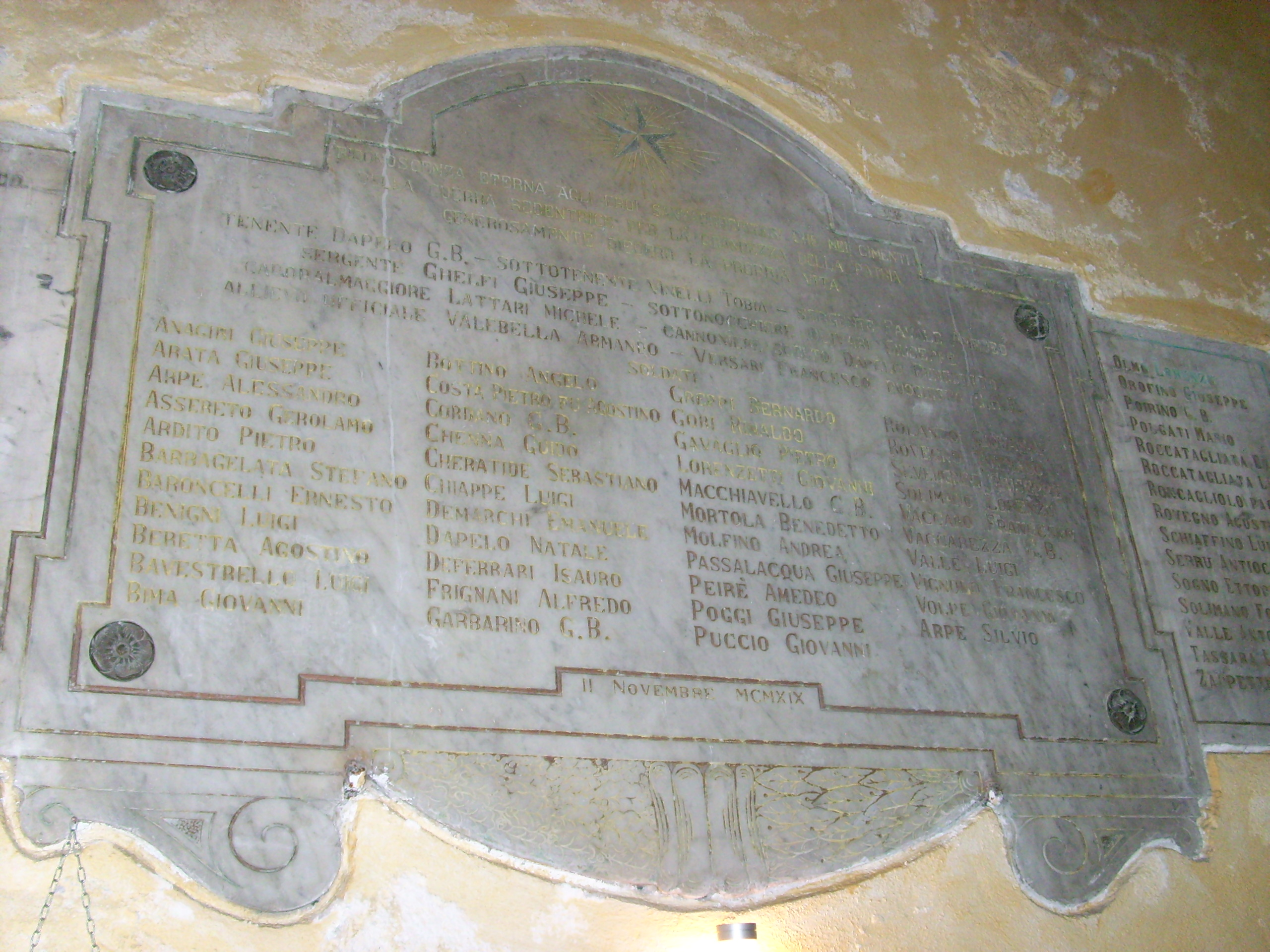
Plaque commemorating the fallen of World War I

== Bibliography ==
- Barni, Gianluigi (1983). Storia di Rapallo e della gente del Tigullio (in Italian). Genoa: Liguria - Edizioni Sabatelli.
- Berri, Pietro (1979). Rapallo nei secoli (in Italian). Rapallo: Edizioni Ipotesi.
