= Cornelia Armsby =

American golfer and socialite (1884–1969)

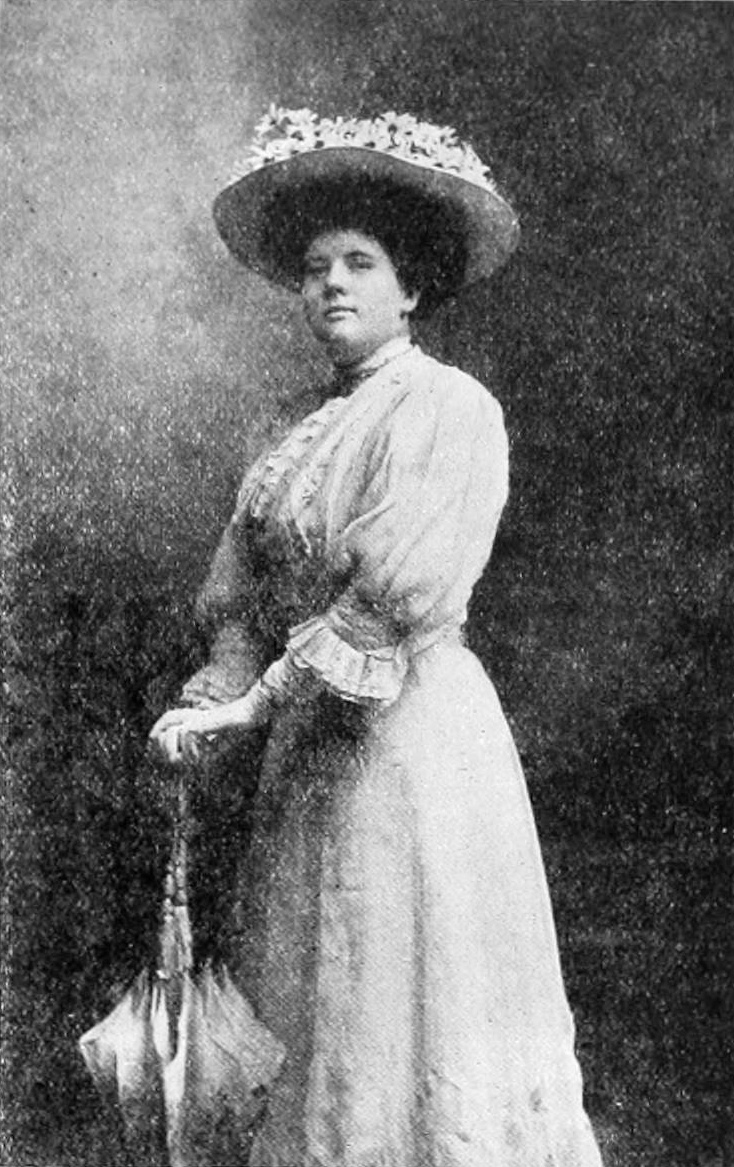
Cornelia Wicker Armsby, from a 1907 publication

Cornelia Wicker Armsby (1884 – April 23, 1969) was an American golfer and socialite, who lived much of her adult life in Europe.

== Early life ==
Cornelia Wicker Armsby was from Evanston, Illinois, the daughter of James Kendall Armsby and Cornelia Anderson Armsby. Her father was a veteran of the American Civil War from Massachusetts. One of her older brothers was George Newell Armsby, a banker and an executive in the food industry.

== Golf ==
Armsby won the Del Monte Cup for Women in 1907, at the site now known as Pebble Beach Golf Links. She also played in the mixed foursomes competition at the event. She played at Burlingame in 1912. In 1919 she was described as "former holder of the women's golf title of Switzerland." She was still playing golf in 1932, when she won the Scordia Golf Cup in Rome.

== Personal life ==
Cornelia Wicker Armsby had an eventful personal life. She was one of the survivors of the 1903 Iroquois Theatre Fire in Chicago. She moved to France before World War I and lived there into the 1930s, sharing a Paris home with her brother Gordon. In 1923, she and her brother Raymond appeared in a silent film, Foolish Wives, among other "society extras". In 1930, she and her brother Raymond had an audience with Pope Pius XII.

She later lived in Rome, where she was a "social leader" among the American residents, and lived in the San Francisco, California area during World War II. She died in Rapallo, Italy, in 1969, aged 85 years.
