= Paraggi =

- Frazione
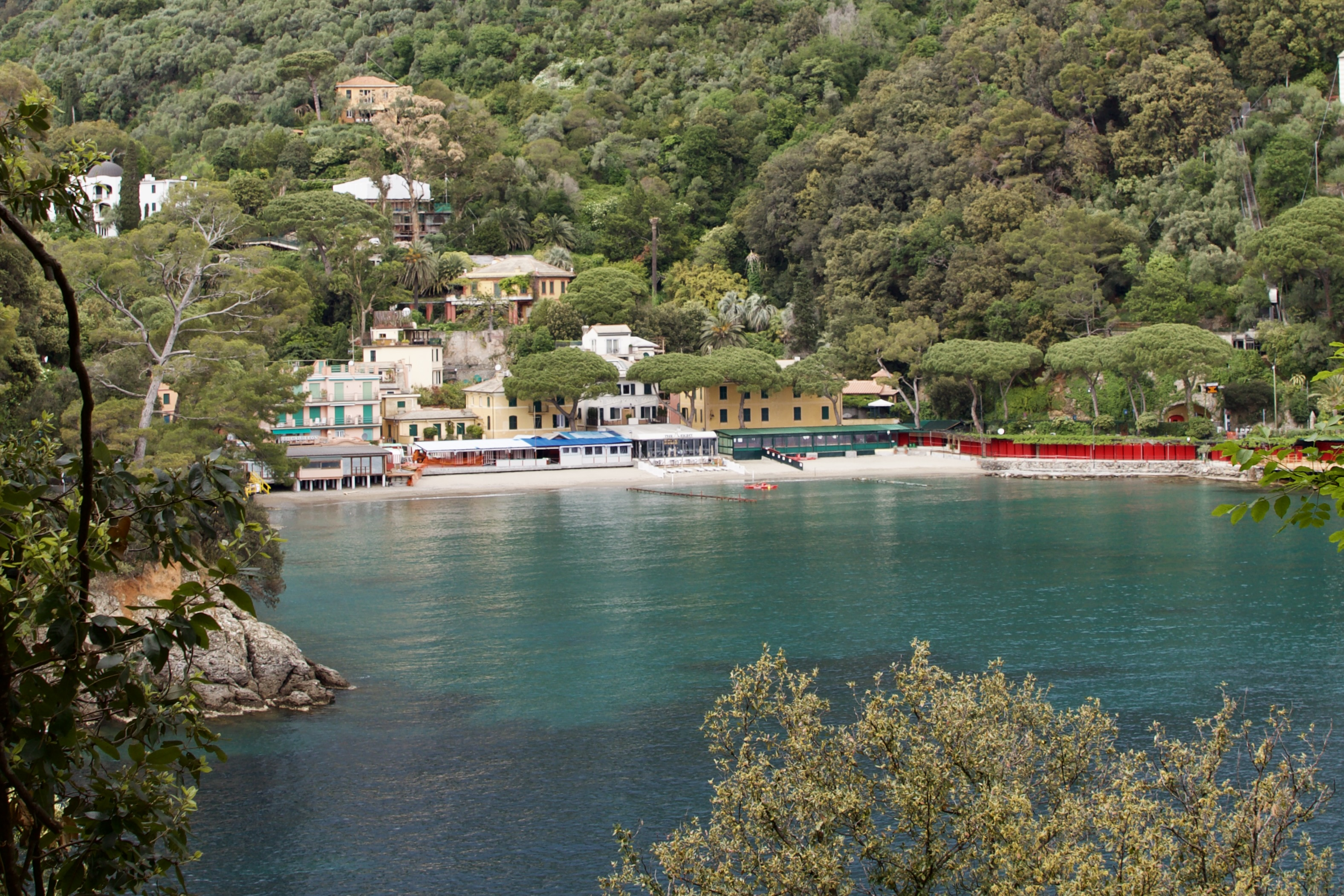
- Paraggi from the trail to Portofino

- Location of Paraggi in Italy
- Coordinates: 44°18′40″N 9°12′32″E
- Country: Italy
- Region: Liguria
- Province: Genoa
- Comune: Santa Margherita Ligure
- Time zone: UTC+1 (CET)
  - Summer (DST): UTC+2 (CEST)

Paraggi is a bay between Santa Margherita Ligure and Portofino. Paraggi beach is a tourist attraction known for its crystal clear blue water. Paraggi beach is a fishing location and a popular attraction for tourists because it is the only sandy beach near Portofino. Most beaches in the area are rocky, and Portofino itself has no beaches, only a beautiful harbor. Paraggi is a public beach, but it also features private beach clubs, as do many other beaches on the Riviera. From the beach, one can see the holiday homes of Dolce and Gabbana and Silvio Berlusconi's son, Pier Silvio Berlusconi.

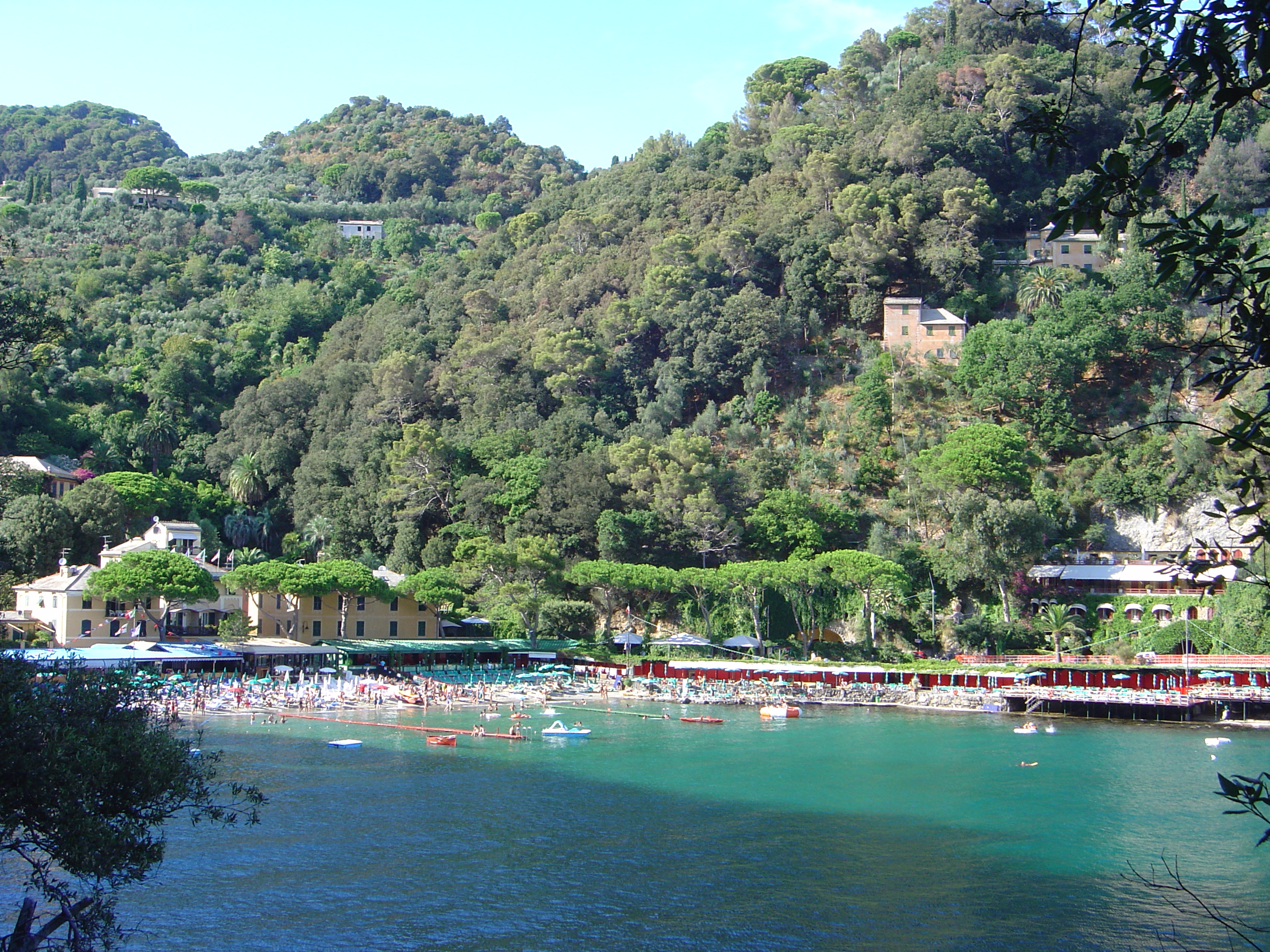

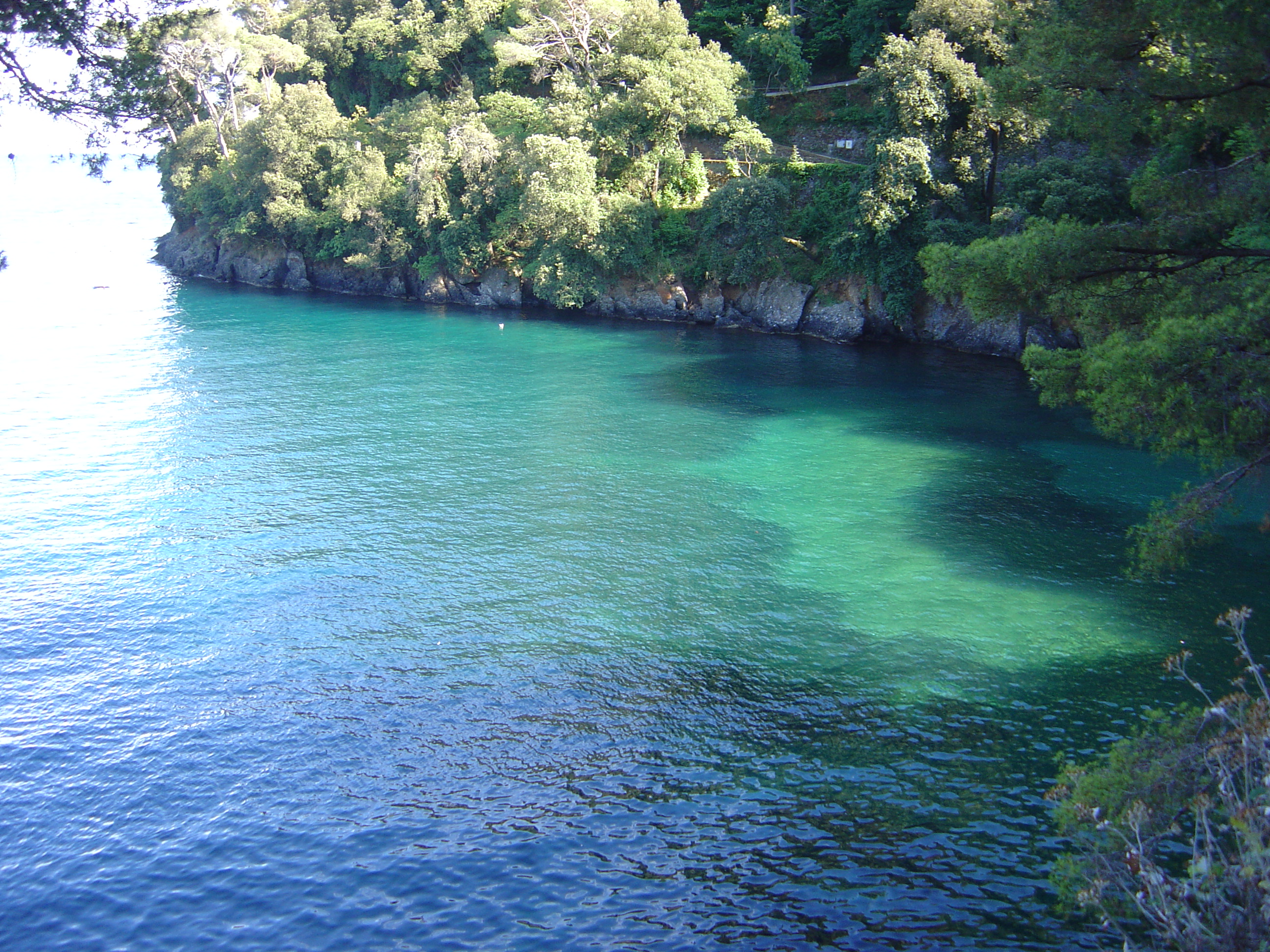

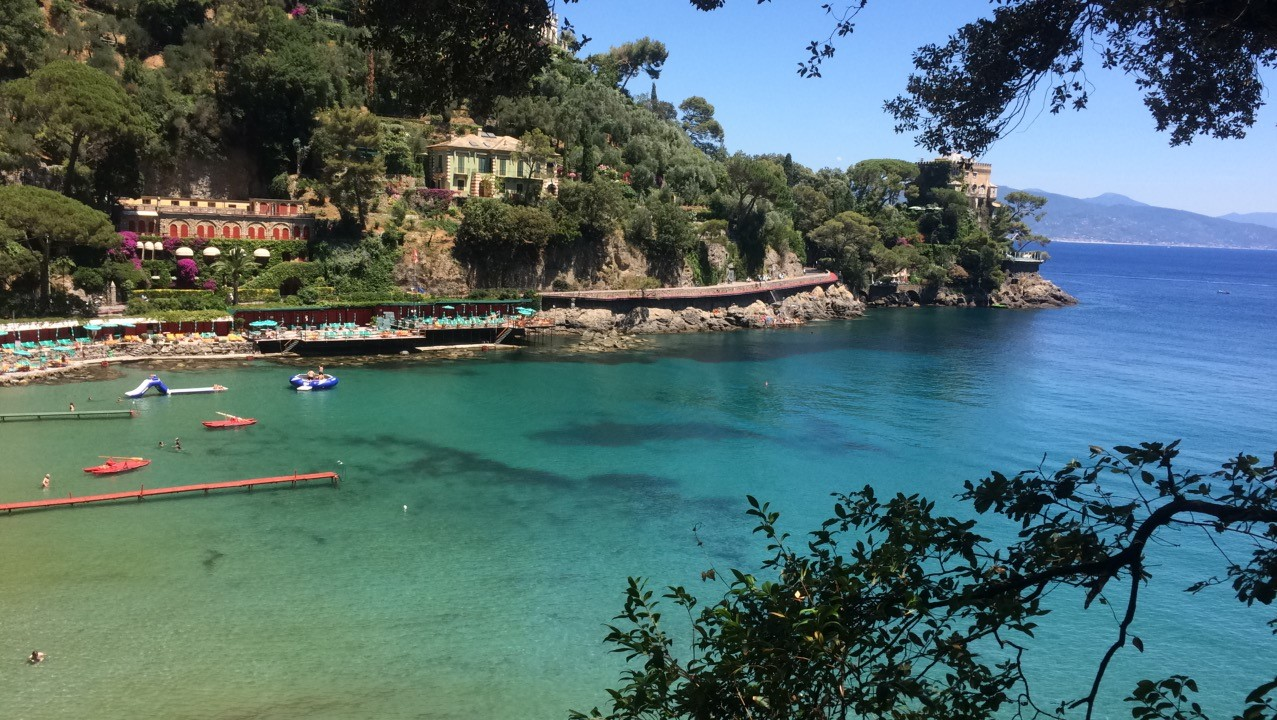

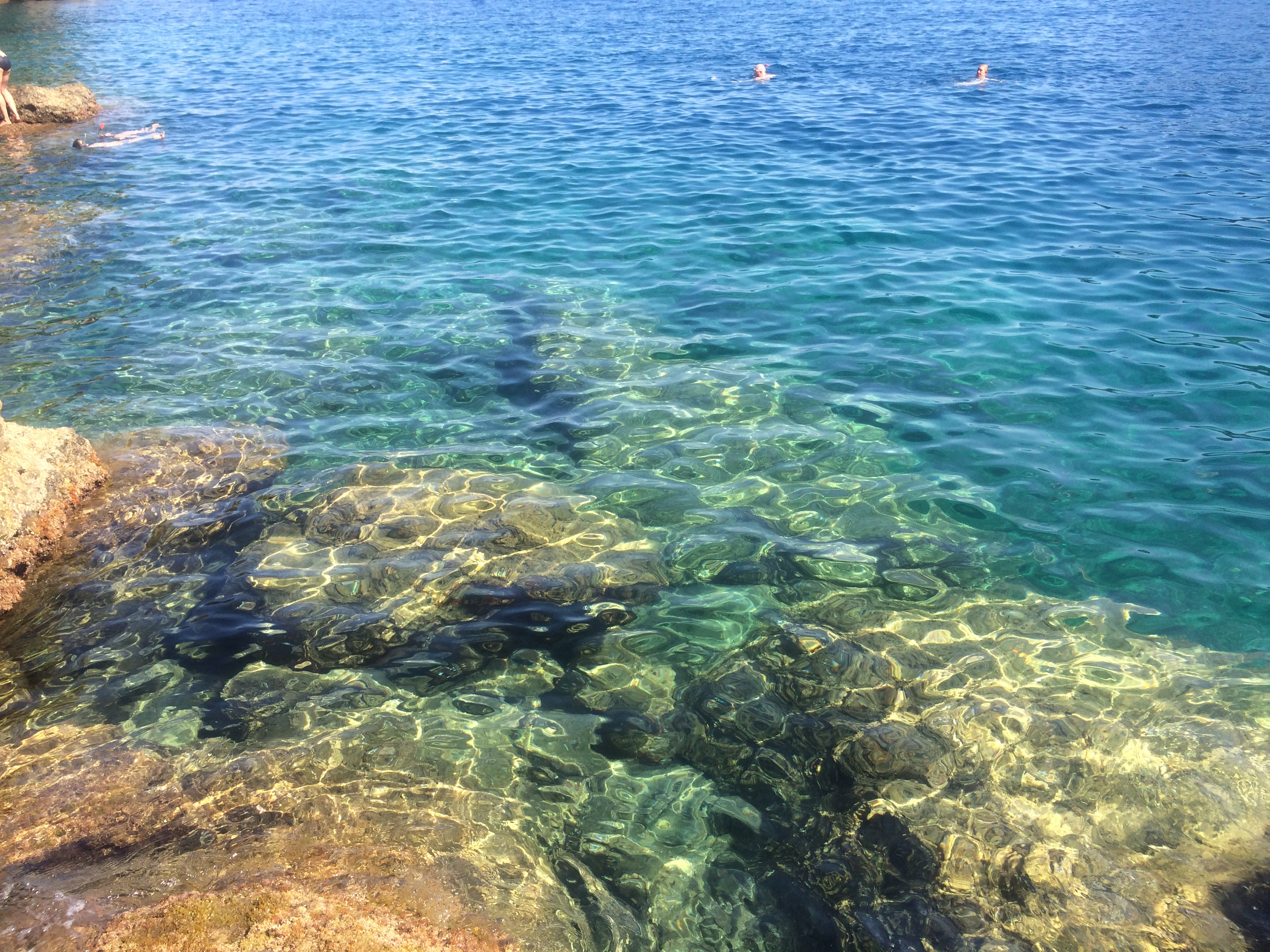

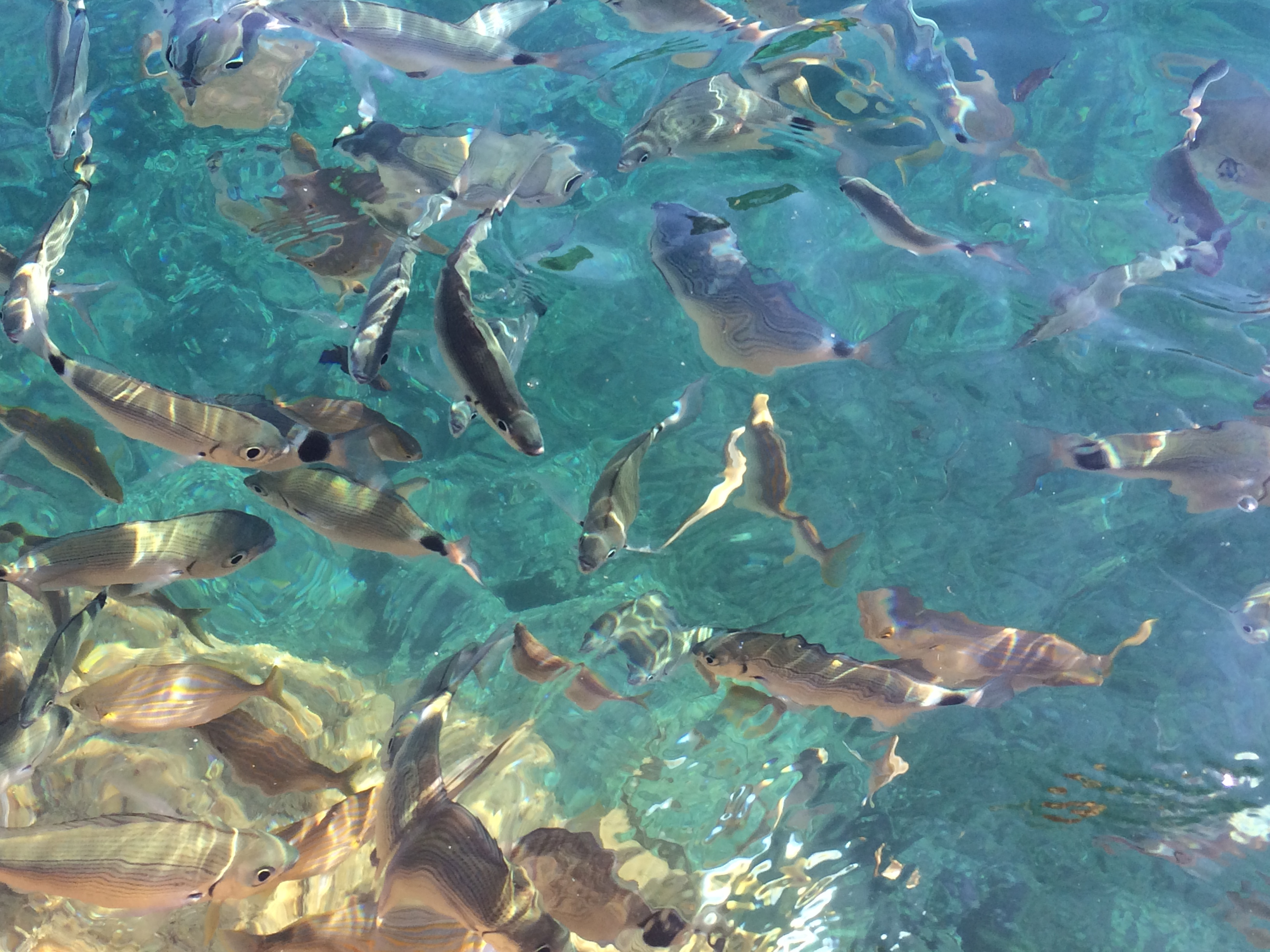

== Main sights ==
- Paraggi Castle

== See also ==
- The Cervara (La Cervara - Abbazia di San Girolamo al Monte di Portofino)
