= Santa Margherita Ligure =

Santa Margherita Ligure Santa Margàita (Ligurian)
- Comune
- Comune di Santa Margherita Ligure
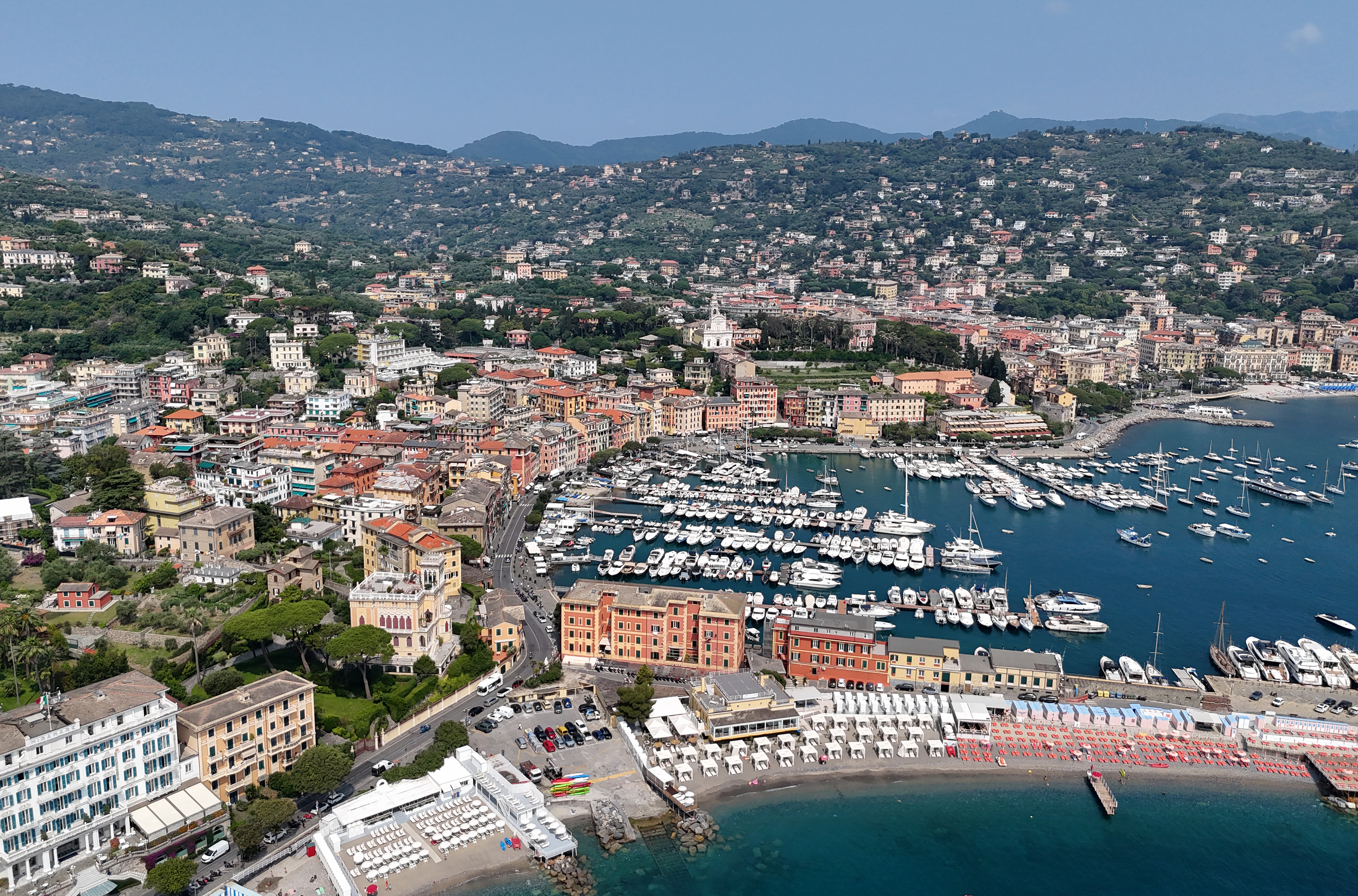
- Santa Margherita Ligure

- Coat of arms

- Location within Italy Location within Liguria
- Coordinates: 44°20′N 9°13′E
- Country: Italy
- Region: Liguria
- Metropolitan city: Genoa (GE)
- Frazioni: Nozarego, Paraggi, San Lorenzo della Costa

Government
  - Mayor: Guglielmo Caversazio

Area
  - Total: 9.8 km^{2} (3.8 sq mi)
- Elevation: 13 m (43 ft)

Population (31 July 2024)
  - Total: 8,395
  - Density: 860/km^{2} (2,200/sq mi)
- Demonym: Sanmargheritesi
- Time zone: UTC+1 (CET)
  - Summer (DST): UTC+2 (CEST)
- Postal code: 16038
- Dialing code: 0185
- Patron saint: St. Margaret of Antiochia
- Saint day: July 20
- Website: Official website

Santa Margherita Ligure (Italian: [ˈsanta marɡeˈriːta ˈliːɡure]; Ligurian: Santa Margàita [ˈsaŋta maɾˈɡajta]) is a comune (municipality) in the Metropolitan City of Genoa in the Italian region of Liguria, located about 35 kilometres (22 mi) southeast of Genoa, in the area traditionally known as Tigullio. It has a port, used for both tourism and fishing activities. Part of comune territory is included in the Regional Natural Park of Portofino. Santa Margherita Ligure borders the municipalities of Camogli, Portofino, and Rapallo.

== History ==
The presence of a Roman settlement has not been definitely proven. The burgh, known as Pescino, was devastated by Rothari in 641 and by the Saracens in the 10th century. Later it was a fief of the Fieschi family until 1229, when it was acquired by the Republic of Genoa.

In 1432 it was attacked by the fleet of Venice and in 1549, together with Rapallo, by that of Turgut.

In 1813, under the Napoleonic domination, the two burghs of Pescino and Corte were unified as Porto Napoleone. In 1815, it was annexed to the Kingdom of Sardinia as the commune of Santa Margherita Ligure. In 1861 it became part of the newly unified Kingdom of Italy.

Connected by rail in the 20th century, Santa Margherita became a renowned tourist resort after World War II.

== Main sights ==
- Castello di Santa Margherita Ligure, built by the Republic of Genoa in 1550 as defence against the increasing attacks of North African pirates. It was designed by the same architect of the Castle of Rapallo. After World War I it was restored and entitled to the Italian victims of that conflict.
- Basilica of St. Margaret of Antiochia, built from 1658 on the remains of a 13th-century church.
- Abbazia della Cervara, a historically relevant abbey on the road to Portofino.
- Villa Durazzo complex, including two patrician villas, a 16th-century castle and 17th-century park.
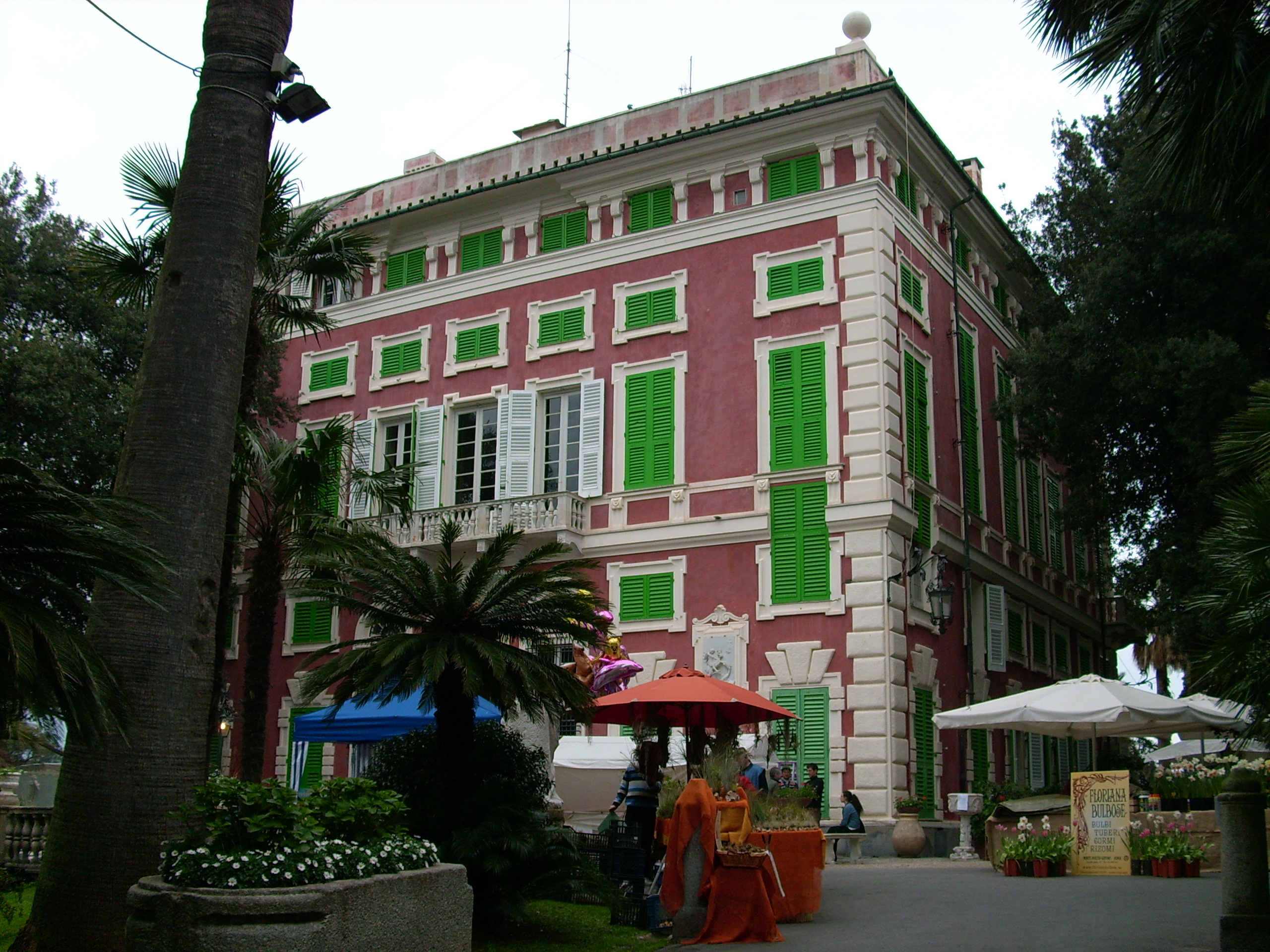
Villa Durazzo

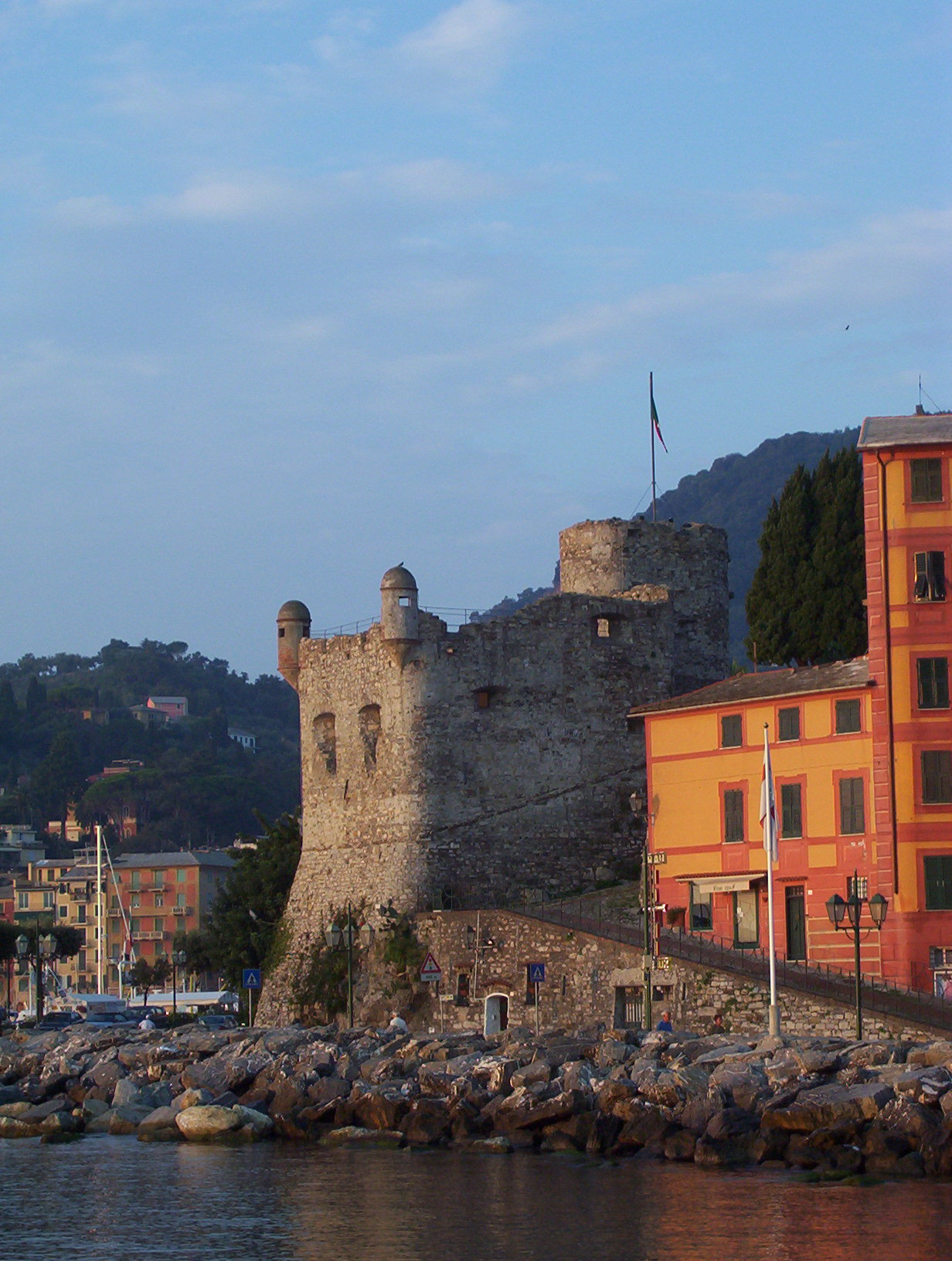
16th-century fort

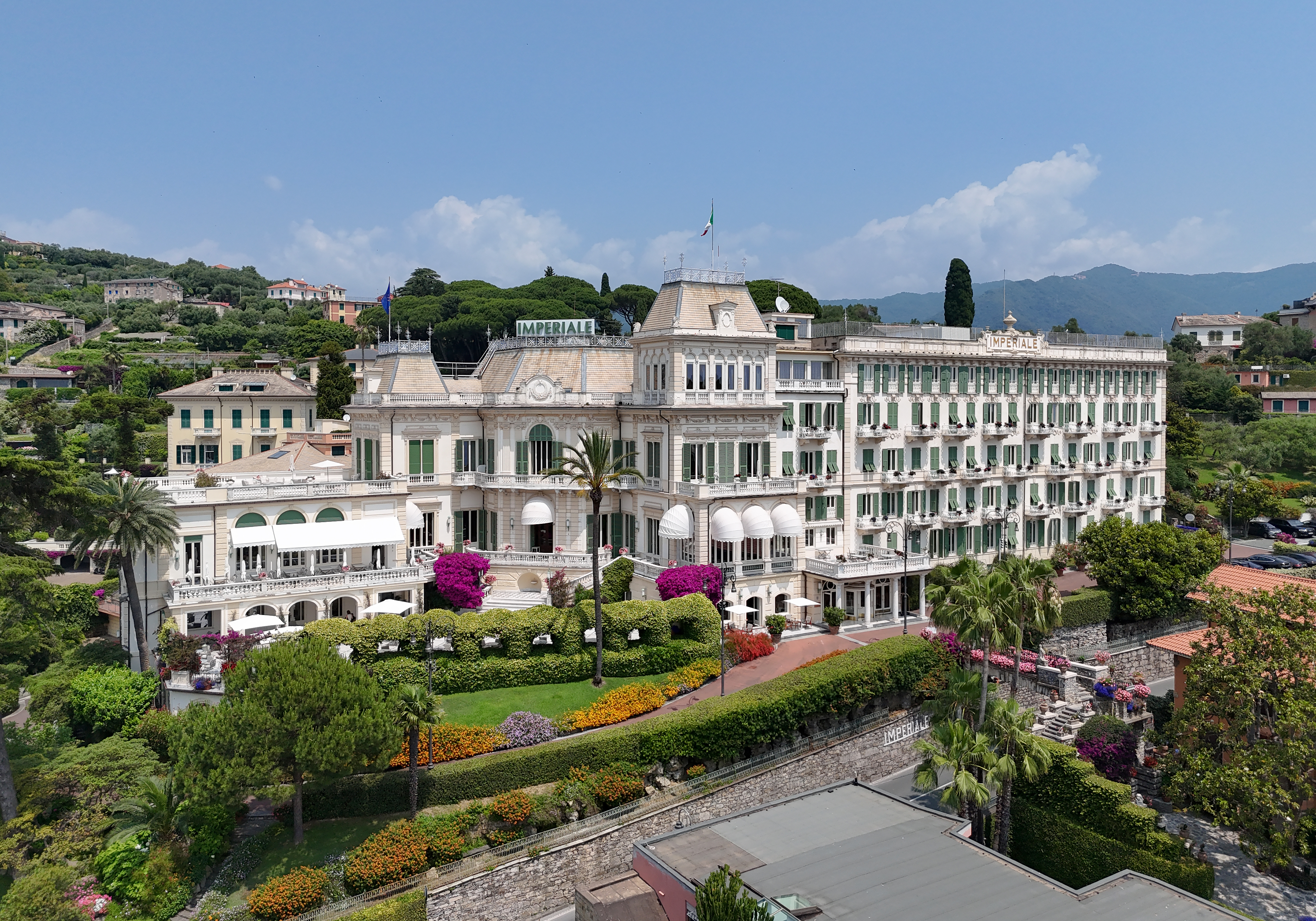
Imperiale Palace Hotel

== Outlying districts ==
- Paraggi was a small village of fishermen and millers. It is located along the "Costa dei Delfini", halfway between Santa Margherita and Portofino. It is about 3 kilometres (1.9 mi) from Santa Margherita Ligure, reachable by bus or by boat.
- Nozarego is a natural terrace over the Bay of Tigullio. Here there is the church of Santa Maria Assunta with the cobbled square in typical ligurian. From Nozarego also leave several trails in the Park of Portofino.
- San Lorenzo della Costa is located on the slopes of the mountain, to the north, along the Aurelia road that leads to Genoa. There is a Flemish triptych in the local 13th-century church.
