= Rapallo =

- Comune
- Comune di Rapallo
- Aerial view of Rapallo

- Flag Coat of arms

- Location within Italy Location within Liguria
- Coordinates: 44°21′N 09°14′E
- Country: Italy
- Region: Liguria
- Metropolitan city: Genoa (GE)
- Frazioni: Montepegli, San Martino di Noceto, San Massimo, San Maurizio di Monti, San Michele di Pagana, San Pietro di Novella, San Quirico d'Assereto, Santa Maria del Campo, Sant'Andrea di Foggia, Santuario di Montallegro

Government
  - Mayor: Elisabetta Ricci

Area
  - Total: 33.61 km^{2} (12.98 sq mi)
- Elevation: 3 m (9.8 ft)

Population (2026)
  - Total: 29,595
  - Density: 880.5/km^{2} (2,281/sq mi)
- Demonym: Rapallesi
- Time zone: UTC+1 (CET)
  - Summer (DST): UTC+2 (CEST)
- Postal code: 16035
- Dialing code: 0185
- Patron saint: Our Lady of Montallegro
- Saint day: July 2
- Website: Official website

Rapallo (US: /rəˈpɑːloʊ/ rə-PAH-loh, Italian: [raˈpallo], Ligurian: [ɾaˈpalːu]) is a town and comune (municipality) in the Metropolitan City of Genoa in the region of Liguria in Italy. As of 2026, with a population 29,595, it is the 2nd-largest municipality in the metropolitan city.

It lies on the Ligurian Sea coast, on the Tigullio Gulf, between Portofino and Chiavari, 25 kilometers east-south east of Genoa itself.

The Parco Naturale Regionale di Portofino, encompassing the territory of six Ligurian communes, includes the Rapallo area.

== History ==
The first settlement dates probably from the 8th century BC, although the findings have not clarified if it was Etruscan or Greek.

The name of the city appears for the first time in a document from 964. In 1203, the Podestà of Rapallo was created, and the town became a Genoese dominion in 1229, remaining under that aegis until the Napoleonic Wars. Galleys from Rapallo took part to the Battle of Meloria of 1284. On 5 September 1494, it was captured by the Aragonese, but three days later 2,500 Swiss troops ousted them.

During the 16th century it was attacked and sacked by the Ottomans and Barbary pirates. To help defend the village against such attacks a castle was built on the seafront. In 1608 Rapallo was made into a Capitaneato (captainship) of its own, as part of the Republic of Genoa.

In the late 18th century it was captured by the French who, after several clashes against Austro-Russian troops, in 1805 annexed it to the Apennins region. In 1814, the English freed it, and the following year the city was given to the Kingdom of Sardinia-Piedmont as part of the Duchy of Genoa.

In late 1917 the Anglo-Franco-Italian Rapallo conference met following the disastrous Italian defeat at Caporetto. It was decided to create a supreme war council at Versailles and to shift some French and British troops to the Italian front. On 12 November 1920, Italy and the Kingdom of the Serbs, Croats, and Slovenes (later renamed Yugoslavia) signed the Treaty of Rapallo (1920), which resolved the frontier issues between them without reference to the other Allies. Italy acquired the strategically important crest of the Julian Alps as its boundary in the northeast. Also concluded at Rapallo was the Russian-German Treaty of Rapallo of April 1922, in which both countries renounced claims to war reparations and renewed diplomatic relations. This agreement marked the emergence of Russia and Germany from the diplomatic isolation caused by World War I (1914–18).

During World War II numerous partisans from Rapallo were shot by German occupation troops.

Rapallo has been known for its climate that made it over the years the winter residence of preference for most of the affluent Italians living in the North West of Italy. Its proximity to the coast makes for mild winters where people can enjoy easy strolls on the sunny promenade and the golfers can enjoy one of the oldest courses in Italy, opened in 1930.

== Demographics ==
As of 2026, the population is 29,595, of which 48.0% are males, and 52.0% are females. Minors make up 12.9% of the population, and seniors make up 29.2%.

Historical population

Year	Pop.	±%
1861	10,491	—
1871	11,112	+5.9%
1881	9,940	−10.5%
1901	10,137	+2.0%
1911	11,271	+11.2%
1921	12,287	+9.0%
1931	13,420	+9.2%
1936	13,947	+3.9%

Year	Pop.	±%
1951	15,639	+12.1%
1961	20,606	+31.8%
1971	26,713	+29.6%
1981	29,547	+10.6%
1991	27,370	−7.4%
2001	29,159	+6.5%
2011	29,226	+0.2%
2021	29,107	−0.4%

Source: ISTAT

=== Immigration ===
Foreign-born population (2025)
Country of birth	Population
Albania	1,127
Romania	419
Ecuador	371
Egypt	330
Morocco	235
Ukraine	232
Moldova	214
Sri Lanka	183
Bangladesh	156
Chile	140
Tunisia	128
China	125
Brazil	97
Russia	95
Peru	91

As of 2025, immigrants make up 17.5% of the population. The 5 largest foreign countries of birth are Albania, Romania, Ecuador, Egypt, and Morocco.

== Main sights ==
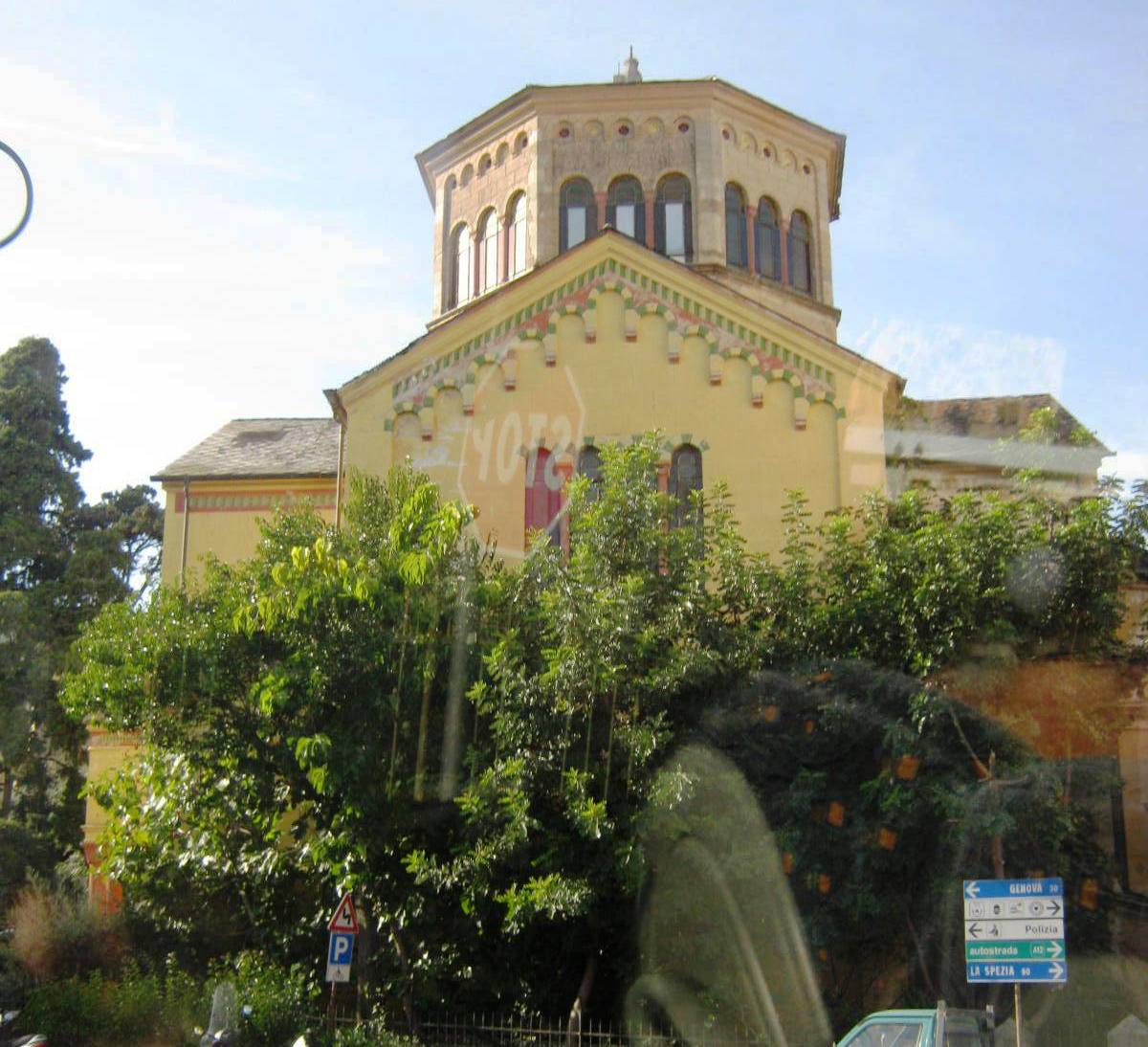
The former English church in Rapallo, St George's Church

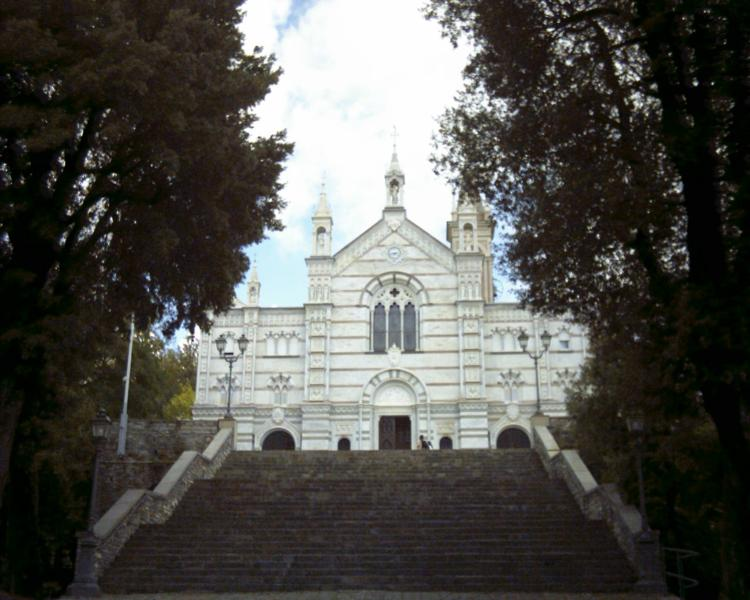
Sanctuary of Nostra Signora di Montallegro

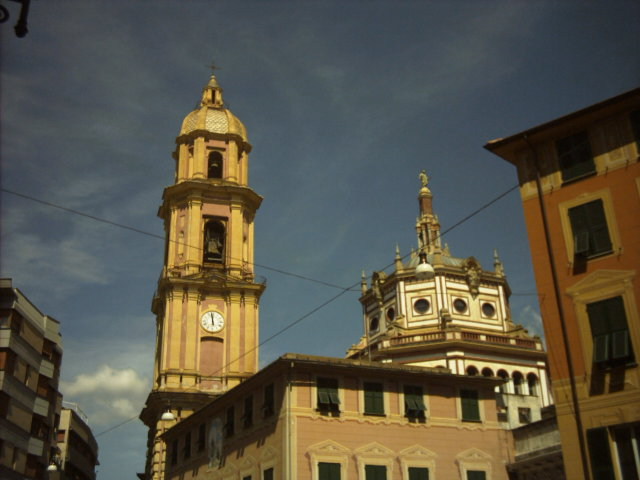
Bell tower and dome of the basilica of San Gervasio e Protasio

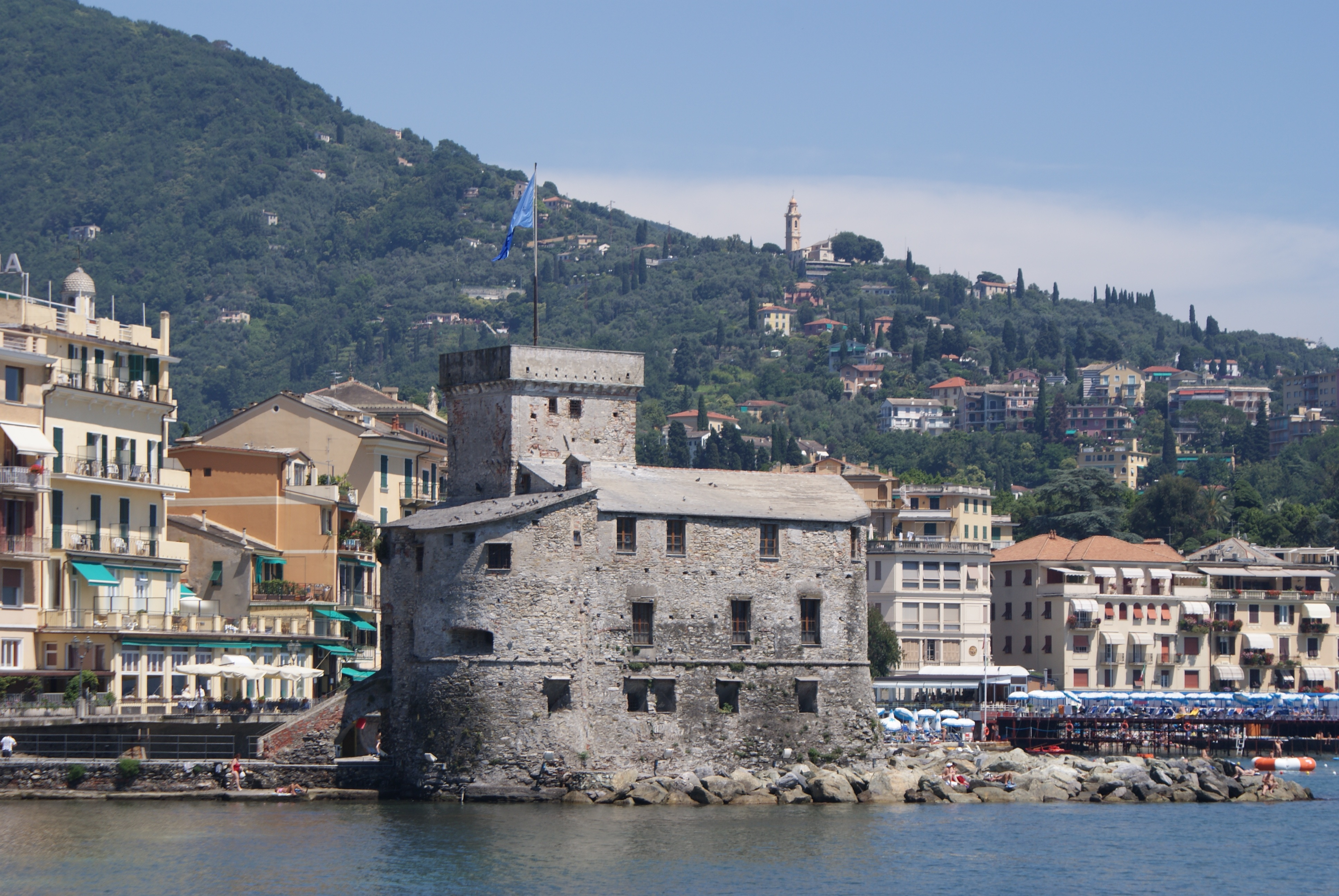
The castle at Rapallo from the gulf

- The Castello sul Mare (Castle-on-the-Sea), erected in 1551 to counter the frequent pirate attacks. It includes a small chapel dedicated to St. Cajetan, built in 1688.
- The Castello di Punta Pagana is a seat of the Sovereign Military Order of Malta. It was finished on 28 July 1631.

== Culture ==
On the first three days of July, each year Rapallo celebrates the apparition of Our Lady of Montallegro, said to have taken place on 2 July 1557, with fireworks.

== Transport ==
Rapallo railway station, opened in 1868, forms part of the Pisa–La Spezia–Genoa railway.

== Literature ==
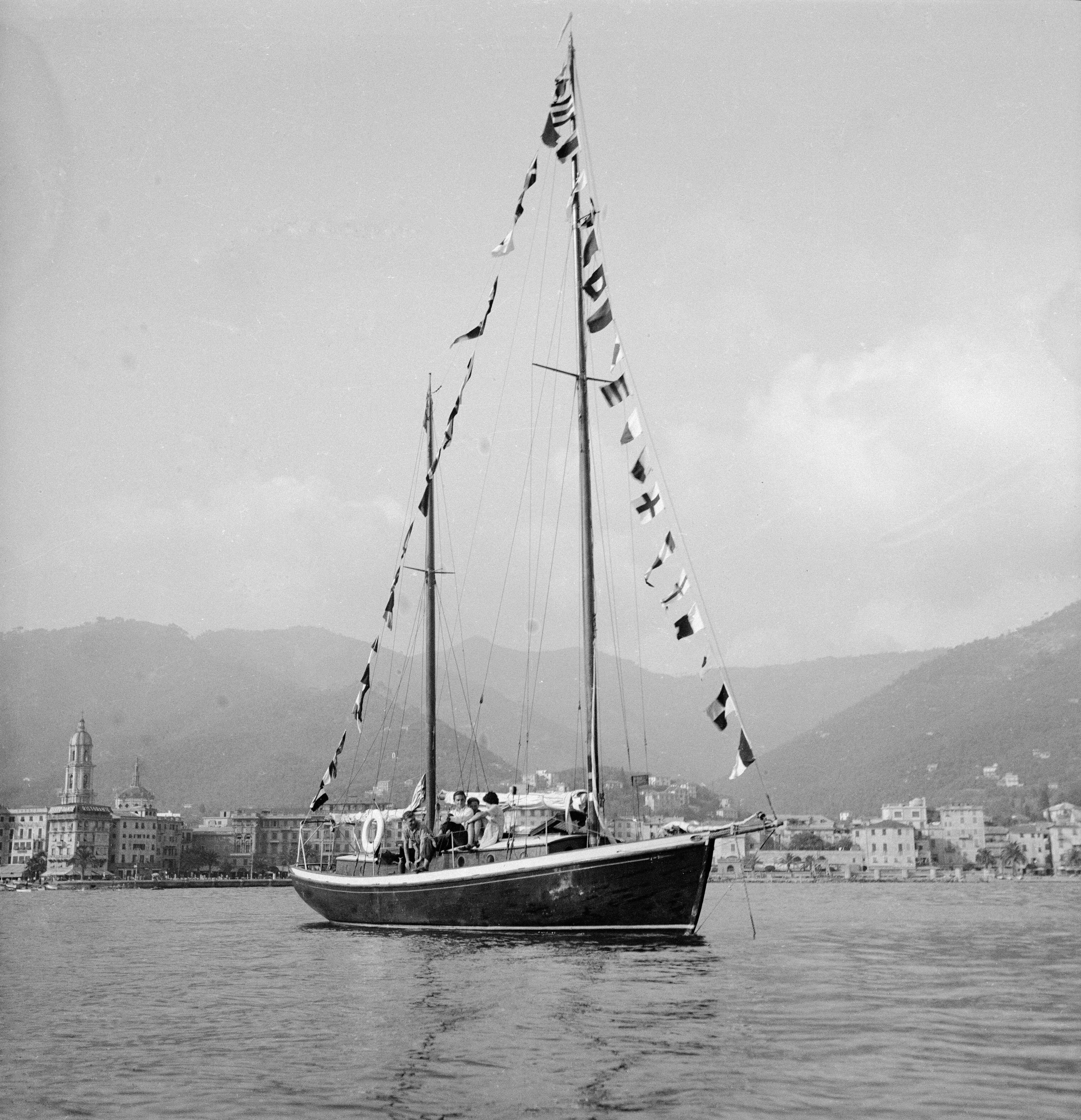
Göran Schildt's ketch Daphne arriving in Rapallo in 1948

Nobel laureate Eugenio Montale wrote a poem entitled "Caffe a Rapallo", published in his early collection Ossi di Seppia (Cuttlefish Bones).

Friedrich Nietzsche wrote Thus Spoke Zarathustra in Rapallo between December 1882 and February 1883.

The author, caricaturist and parodist Max Beerbohm lived in Rapallo from 1910 until his death in 1956, returning to Britain during World War I and World War II.

The American war poet John Allan Wyeth lived in Rapallo during the 1920s and early '30s.

The theatre designer and artist Gordon Craig lived in Villa Raggio, next door to Beerbohm, from 1917 to 1928.

Rapallo is the setting for most of Elmore Leonard's crime novel Pronto.

The American poet Robert Lowell published the poem "Sailing Home From Rapallo" in his influential 1959 book Life Studies. The poem is about Lowell's journey from Rapallo back to the United States by ship with the body of his deceased mother who died in Rapallo on vacation in 1954.

== Notable people ==
- The polymath Fortunio Liceti was born in Rapallo in 1577.
- Cornelia Wicker Armsby, an American golfer and socialite, died at Rapallo in 1969.
- Max Beerbohm, the caricaturist and essayist, lived in Rapallo from 1910 until his death in 1956, with the exception of the two World Wars.
- Domingo Ghirardelli, founder of the Ghirardelli Chocolate Company was born in Rapallo in 1817 and also died there while visiting in 1894.
- Sir Edmund Grimani Hornby, former Chief Judge of the British Supreme Consular Court at Constantinople and British Supreme Court for China and Japan died in Rapallo in 1896 and was buried there.
- The poet Ezra Pound lived in Rapallo between the years 1924 and 1945, and part-time from 1959 to 1972, and wrote much of his Cantos there. His father, Homer Pound, is buried in the non-Catholic section of Cimitero Urbano on Via Cerisola.
- Sir Charles Hercules Read, British archaeologist and curator, died in Rapallo in 1929 and is buried in the non-Catholic section of Cimitero Urbano.
- The Finnish composer Jean Sibelius stayed with his family in Rapallo in 1901, where he conceived ideas for his Symphony No. 2.
- Alexandra Zazzi, Swedish-Italian chef and television personality, was born in 1966 and grew up in Rapallo.
- The artists Wassily Kandinsky and Gabriele Münter had an extended stay in Rapallo in 1905, where Münter produced some twenty paintings.
- The American actress Dorothy Gish stayed at a clinic in Rapallo for two years and died there in 1968.
- The rapper Sayf (born 1999) was raised in Rapallo.

=== Honorary citizens ===
Among the recipients of the honorary citizenship of Rapallo are:

Date	Name	Notes
1992	Andrew Bertie	78th Grand Master of the Knights Hospitaller 1988–2008
18 September 2008	Matthew Festing	79th Grand Master of the Knights Hospitaller 2008–2017

== International relations ==
=== Twin towns – sister cities ===
Rapallo is twinned with:

- Iquique, Chile
