= Świna Tunnel =

Underwater road tunnel in Poland

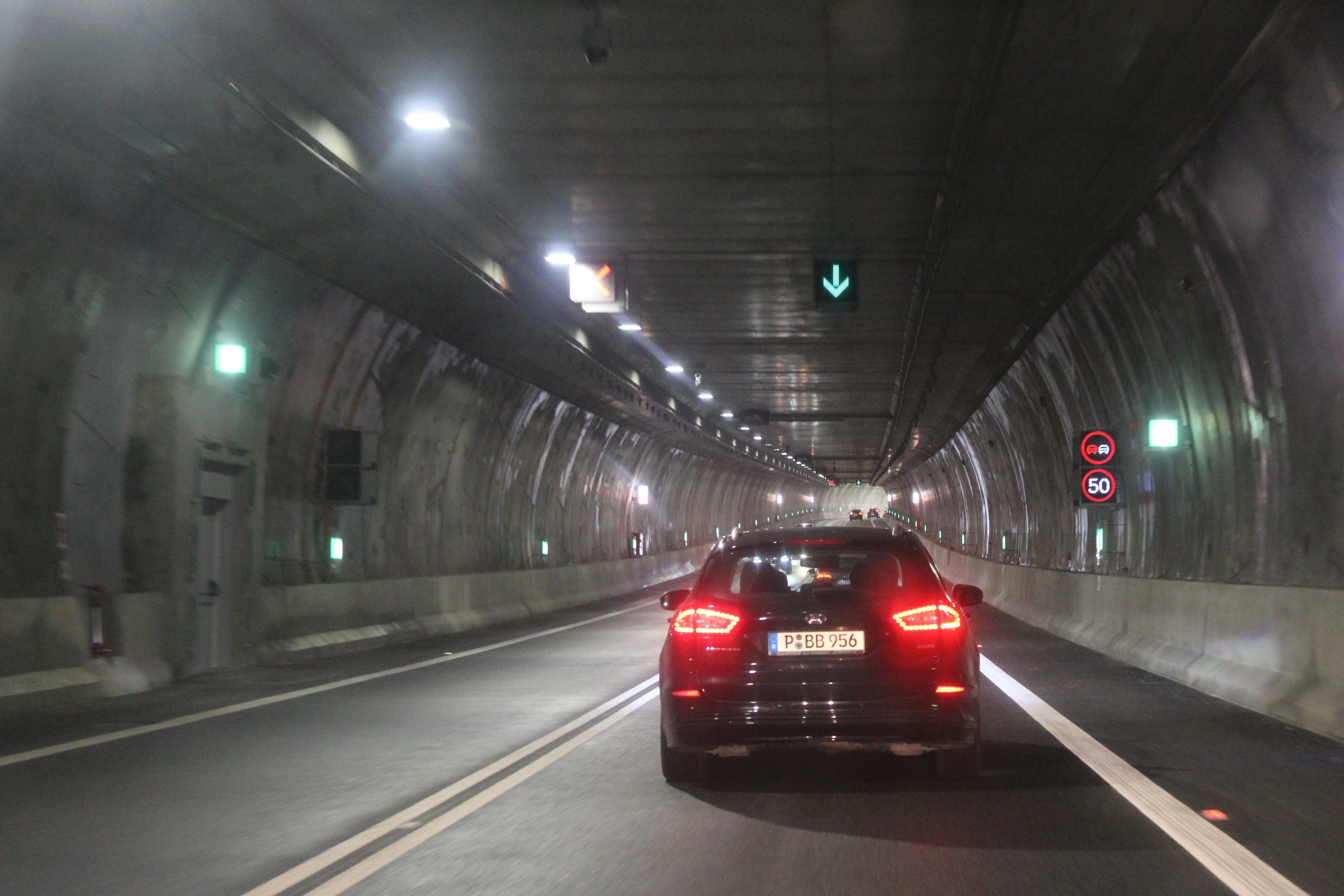
- View from inside the tunnel towards the eastern exit
- Interactive map of Świna Tunnel

Overview
- Official name: Tunel pod Świną
- Location: Świnoujście, West Pomeranian Voivodeship, Poland
- Coordinates: 53°53′39″N 14°15′18″E
- Status: Completed
- Route: DK 93
- Crosses: Świna
- Start: Świnoujście, Uznam, Poland
- End: Świnoujście, Wolin, Poland

Operation
- Work began: 17 September 2018
- Opened: 30 June 2023
- Traffic: car, minibus, van
- Character: Undersea

Technical
- Length: 1.78 km (1.11 mi)
- No. of lanes: 1 x 2
- Min elevation: −38.0 m (−124.7 ft)
- Width: 11.0 m (36.1 ft)

The Świna Tunnel (Polish: Tunel pod Świną) is a tunnel beneath the Świna Channel in Świnoujście, Poland, connecting the islands of Usedom and Wolin which separate the Szczecin Lagoon from the Baltic Sea in north western Poland. It constitutes the only fixed link between two parts of the city and subsequently between the rest of the country and the center of Świnoujście which prior to the tunnels opening in 2023 was accessible only by ferry.

The tunnel carries route DK 93 of the Polish national roads network. On the left (west) bank of the Świna Channel, the tunnel begins at Karsiborska Street. On the right (west) bank, the tunnel joins Fińska Street leading to the end of the S3 Expressway which forms the Polish section of the European route E65. The existing ferry route is preserved for pedestrians and cyclists, slow moving vehicles and vehicles carrying dangerous substances which are prohibited in the tunnel.

== Geography ==
Świnoujście is the only city in Poland located on multiple (44 in total) islands and islets, of which only three are permanently inhabited: Uznam, Wolin, and Karsibór. Most of the city's population (80 percent) lives on the left bank of the city on the island of Uznam. The westside of the city is also home to the center of the city, hosting services, and tourist points of interest. The right bank of the city on the island of Wolin contains the city's sea, rail, and road transit hub. The city is divided by the strait of the Świna, which is also the fairway for sea traffic between Szczecin and the Baltic Sea. The island of Uznam lacked direct road access to the rest of Poland. Proposals for a bridge have been deemed infeasible due to the high costs of constructing a structure with the necessary height to provide sufficient clearance for ships traveling to and from the seaport in Szczecin and risk of disrupting maritime traffic. An immersed tube tunnel was also considered but rejected due to required temporary blocking of the shipping lane during construction.

The city of Świnoujście provided two toll-free ferry crossings operated by four ships each. An alternative land crossing is possible since the implementation of the Schengen Agreement through German territory, using a bridge across the river Peenestrom, but requires a significant detour.

== History ==
In 2006 the government of Poland launched a feasibility study which decided to bore a single tube tunnel between the island, however the project was put on hold in 2011 and unfrozen only in 2016.

The contract for the design and construction of the tunnel was signed on 17 September 2018 with a consortium of PORR SA (consortium leader), PORR Bau GmbH, Gülermak, and Energopol - Szczecin SA, whose offer amounted to PLN 793.186 million.

The original planned opening date of the tunnel was 17 September 2022, but as of 29 October 2022, the date has been moved to a more vague 4th quarter of 2022. The tunnel was opened on 30 June 2023.

The cost of the investment is estimated at PLN 915 million, of which 775.6 million comes from the European Union funds. The Świnoujście local government will contribute nearly PLN 140 million.

The lowest point of the tunnel is about 38.0 m (124.7 ft) below the sea level.
