= Świnoujście Lighthouse =

Lighthouse in Poland

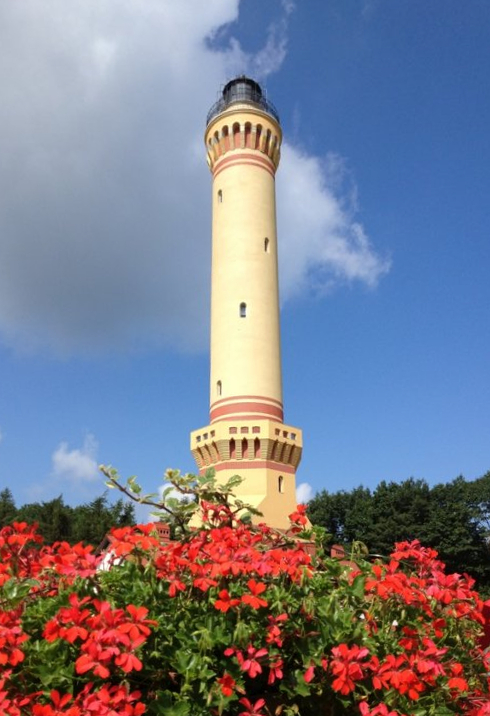
- Location: Świnoujście; West Pomeranian Voivodeship; Poland
- Coordinates: 53.915979°N 14.284340°E

Tower
- Constructed: 1828 (first)
- Construction: brick tower
- Height: 212 feet (65 m)
- Shape: cylindrical tower with balcony and lantern rising from an octagonal prism basement with balcony
- Markings: unpainted yellow brick tower, red dwelling, black lantern
- Heritage: immovable monument in Poland

Light
- First lit: 1857 (current)
- Focal height: 223 feet (68 m)
- Lens: 1st order Fresnel lens
- Range: white: 25 nautical miles (46 km; 29 mi) red: 9 nautical miles (17 km; 10 mi)
- Characteristic: white light 4s on, 1s off; red light southwestward

Świnoujście Lighthouse (Polish: Latarnia Morska Świnoujście) is an active lighthouse in Świnoujście, Poland. At a height of 212 feet (65 m) it is the fifteenth tallest "traditional lighthouse" in the world, as well as the tallest brick lighthouse, and the tallest in Poland. It is located on the east bank of the river Świna just inside the entrance.

== History ==
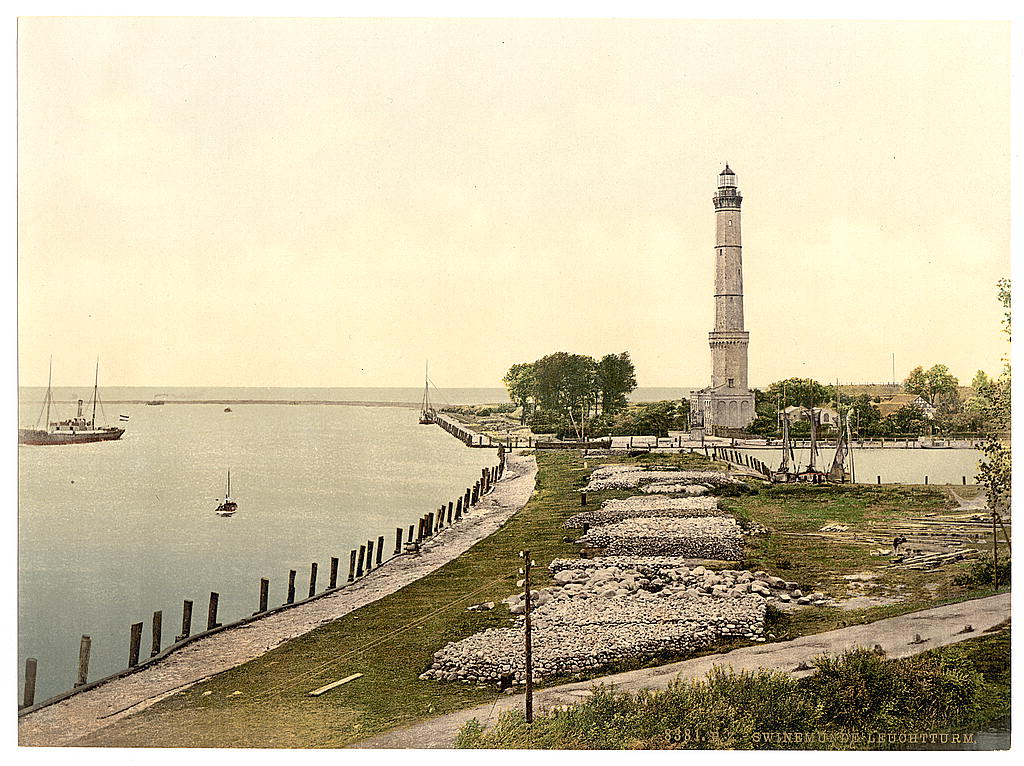
The lighthouse on a late 19th century postcard

The first lighthouse in the location was built in 1828 when the town was part of the Kingdom of Prussia and called Swinemünde. The current structure is from 1857. The cross-section of the entire 1857 tower was octagonal. However, in 1902–1903 the tower was restored to repair spalled brickwork. This converted the shape of the tower above the first gallery to the current round shape.

The tower was damaged during World War II. In 1945, during the retreat of the German troops, an order was given to destroy the lighthouse. However, the German keeper refused the order and the tower survived. The damage was only repaired in 1959, some fourteen years after the town was annexed by Poland.

In 1998–2000, for the new Millennium, the lighthouse was restored. It was reopened to the public in August 2000, along with a lighthouse museum in the keeper's house.

== Construction ==
The tower is built of yellow bricks and is unpainted. The base of the tower is octagonal with a gallery. The tower itself is round with a second gallery and a lantern. In clear weather the view from the top gallery is about 45 kilometres (28 mi). Adjacent to the tower is a 2-story brick keeper's house and a museum.

There are 300 steps up to the second gallery.

== Visiting ==
The museum and tower are open Monday through Friday.

== See also ==
- List of lighthouses in Poland
- List of tallest lighthouses in the world
