= Stawa Młyny =

Polish lighthouse

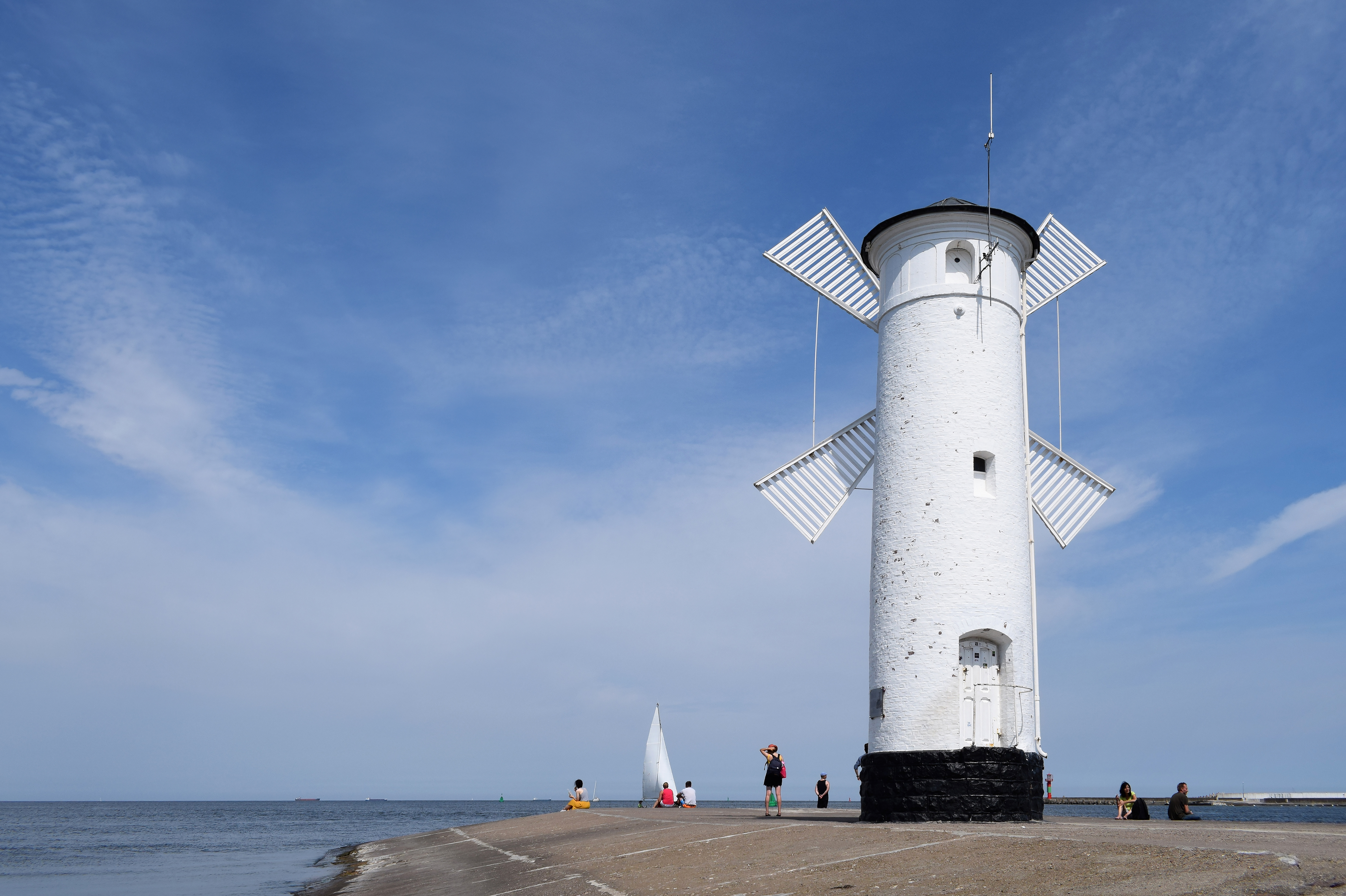
- Stawa Młyny beacon, Świnoujście
- Location: Świnoujście, Poland
- Coordinates: 53°55′34″N 14°16′39″E

Tower
- Constructed: 1873–1874
- Height: 10 m

Light
- First lit: 1874
- Focal height: 11 m (36 ft)
- Range: 17 nmi (31 km; 20 mi)
- Characteristic: Oc W 10s

Stawa Młyny (German: Mühlenbake) is a beacon in the shape of a windmill in Świnoujście, West Pomeranian Voivodeship; in Poland. The beacon acts as a signal for vessels entering the Port of Świnoujście, from the Baltic Sea.

== Description ==
The beacon is 10 meters in height; painted white with a black roof. The beacon was built between 1873 and 1874 during the modernisation of the ship route into the Port of Świnoujście (then: Swinemünde).

Stawa Młyny is an official symbol of Świnoujście, being part of the official logo of the city, which is characterised with the beacon. The beacon is a popular tourist attraction in Świnoujście and the Island of Uznam; the beacon is known for being featured on postcards of the town, and is popular part for guided tours around Świnoujście.

There is a legend associated with the Mill Pond. When Świnoujście/Swinemünde became a port city, its inhabitants began to work on ships, leaving for long cruises. The wives waited for the sailors, who returned exhausted and aged. One of them, Alice, distraught by the appearance of her beloved Christopher, went to the seashore at night and cried. A mysterious voice told her to seek rescue in the windmill behind her, from which the old miller came out. He ordered Alice to come the next day with her husband; then he ordered to cover him with mud, take a bath in the sea and walk on the shore. A week later, he took him to a windmill. After some time, Alice's husband came out of the interior rejuvenated. The windmill was quickly visited by other sailors as well. However, when the old miller died, it turned out that no one knew the secrets of his treatments, and the mechanism of the windmill stopped. Despite this, people thirsty for rejuvenation continued to come – and still come today – to Świnoujście to cover themselves with mud, swim and walk.
