= Świnoujście =

City in West Pomerania, Poland

- City county
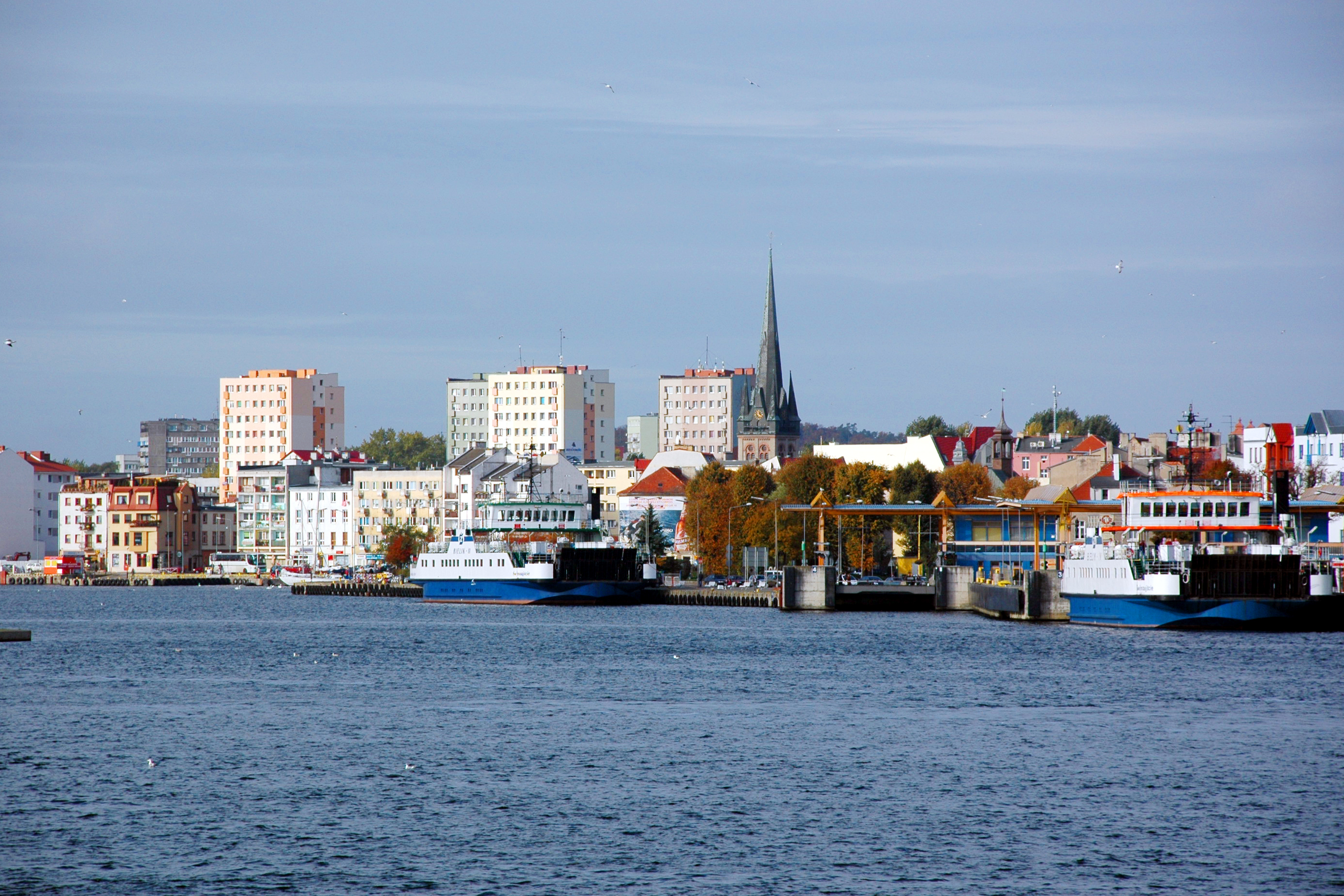
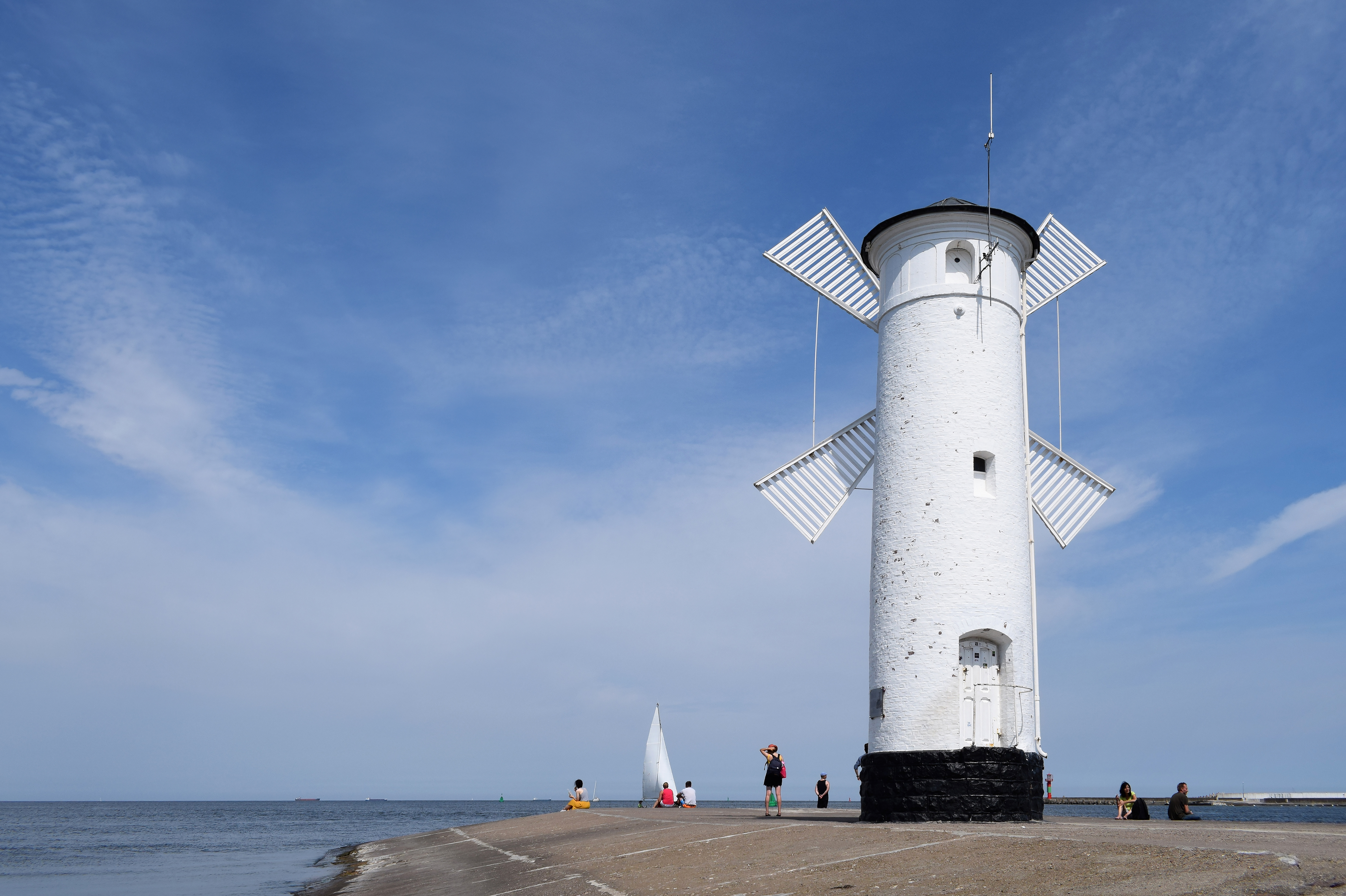
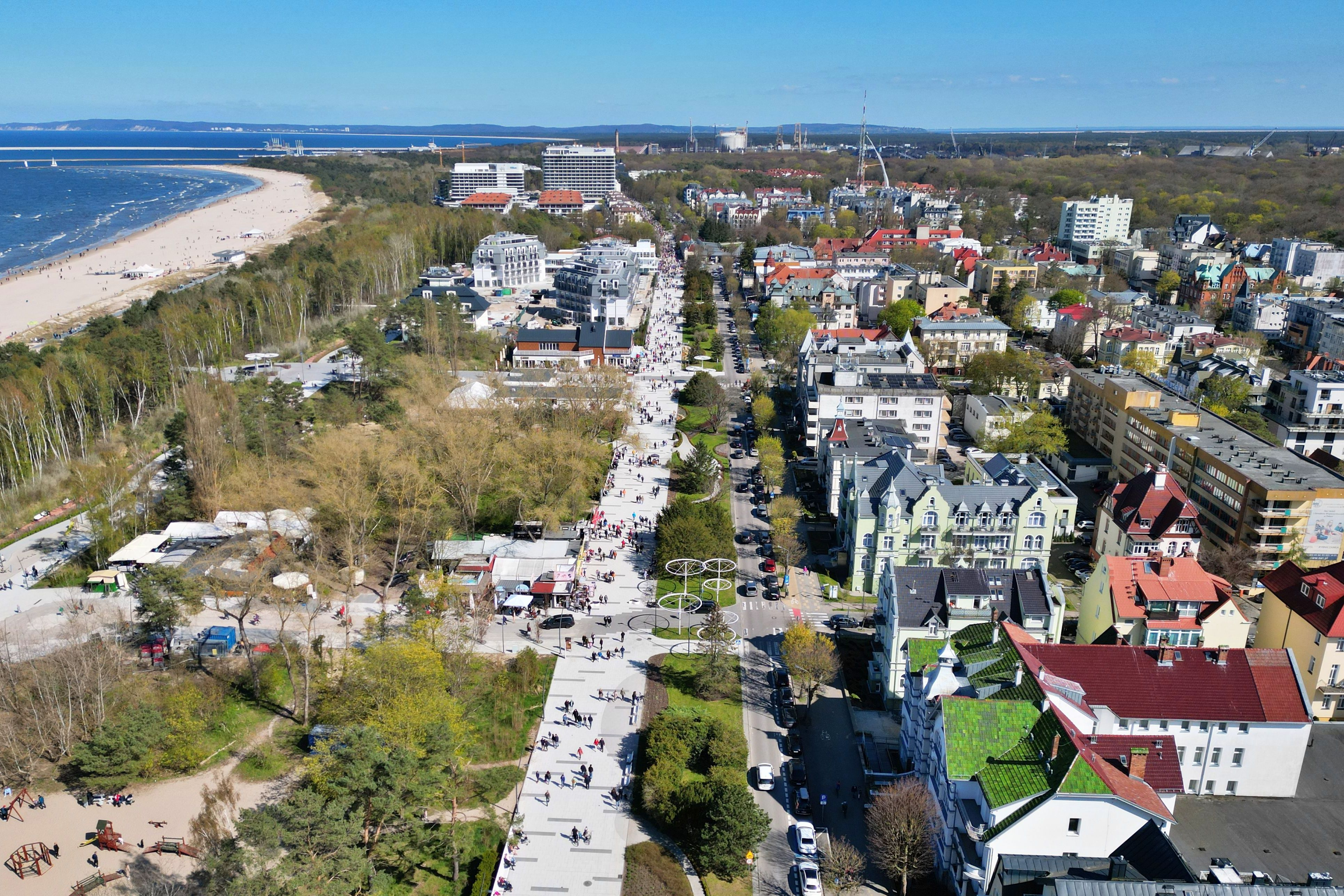
- Clockwise: City panorama, aerial view, and the Stawa Młyny (windmill beacon)

- Flag Coat of arms

- Location within Poland
- Coordinates: 53°55′N 14°15′E
- Country: Poland
- Voivodeship: West Pomeranian
- County: City County
- Established: 12th century
- City rights: 1765

Government
  - City mayor: Joanna Agatowska (L)

Area
  - Total: 202.7 km^{2} (78.3 sq mi)
- Elevation: 5 m (16 ft)

Population (2024)
  - Total: 38,728
  - Density: 191.1/km^{2} (494.8/sq mi)
- Time zone: UTC+1 (CET)
  - Summer (DST): UTC+2 (CEST)
- Postal code: 72-600 to 72-612
- Area code: +48 091
- Car plates: ZSW
- Climate: Cfb

Świnoujście (Polish: [ɕfʲinɔˈujɕt͡ɕɛ]; German: Swinemünde German pronunciation: [ˌsviːnəˈmʏndə]; Low German: Swienemünn; meaning "Świna [river] mouth"; Kashubian: Swina) is a city in Western Pomerania and seaport on the Baltic Sea and Szczecin Lagoon, in the extreme north-west of Poland, mainly on the islands of Usedom, Wolin, and Karsibór, the latter once part of Usedom, now separated by the Piast Canal to facilitate ship access to Szczecin.

Świnoujście borders the German seaside resort of Ahlbeck on Usedom, connected by a street and 12 km (7 mi) of beach promenade.

Since 1999, Świnoujście has been a city with powiat rights, within West Pomeranian Voivodeship. The city lies in the geographic region of Pomerania and had a population of 38,728 in 2024. Świnoujście is one of the most important areas of the Szczecin metropolitan area. The Świnoujście LNG terminal, opened in 2015, is in the city. In 2023, the Świnoujście Tunnel connecting the islands of Wolin and Usedom was opened.

Despite its relatively small population, Świnoujście is Poland's ninth-largest city by area.

== History ==
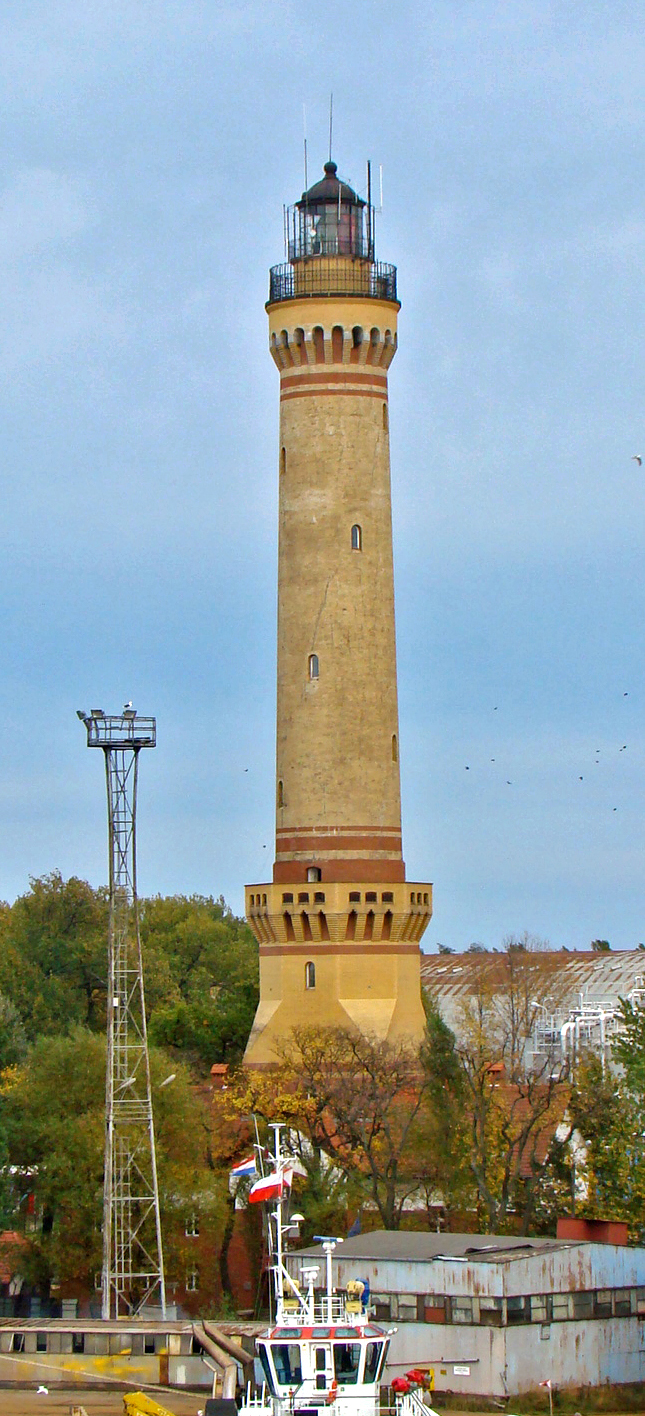
Świnoujście Lighthouse is Poland's tallest lighthouse, and one of the tallest such structures in the world.

The first human settlements in areas that are now Świnoujście appeared five thousand years ago, as confirmed by archaeological findings. The area was included in the emerging Polish state in the 10th century by its first ruler Mieszko I.

In the early 12th century, the island became part of the Duchy of Pomerania, founded as a vassal duchy of Poland. In later centuries, local Pomeranian princes ruled the area, and on both sides of the river, they built fortified castles, which were destroyed by the Danish invasions in 1170 and 1173. Between 1185 and 1227, the settlement was part of a Danish fief.

In 1297, Duke Bogusław IV granted merchants who entered through Świna protection and exemption from customs duties on the return journey, and most of the larger cities of Pomerania were eventually granted full exemption from customs duties on the Świna, yet the local castle was still destroyed by the city of Szczecin in 1457. The village of Świna was mentioned in 1418.

During the Thirty Years' War (1618–1648) the city became part of the Swedish Empire.

The strait Świna (Swine) was formerly flanked by the fishing villages of Westswine and Ostswine. Towards the beginning of the 17th century, it was made navigable for large ships. The Kingdom of Prussia gained the area in 1720 from Sweden, and included it in her Pomeranian province. Swinemünde was founded on the site of Westswine in 1748, fortified, and received town privileges from King Frederick II of Prussia in 1765. It served as the outer port of Stettin (Szczecin) and was administered within the Province of Pomerania. During the Seven Years' War, the Swedes attempted to block the port. Swinemünde became part of the German Empire after the Kingdom of Prussia completed the unification of Germany in 1871.

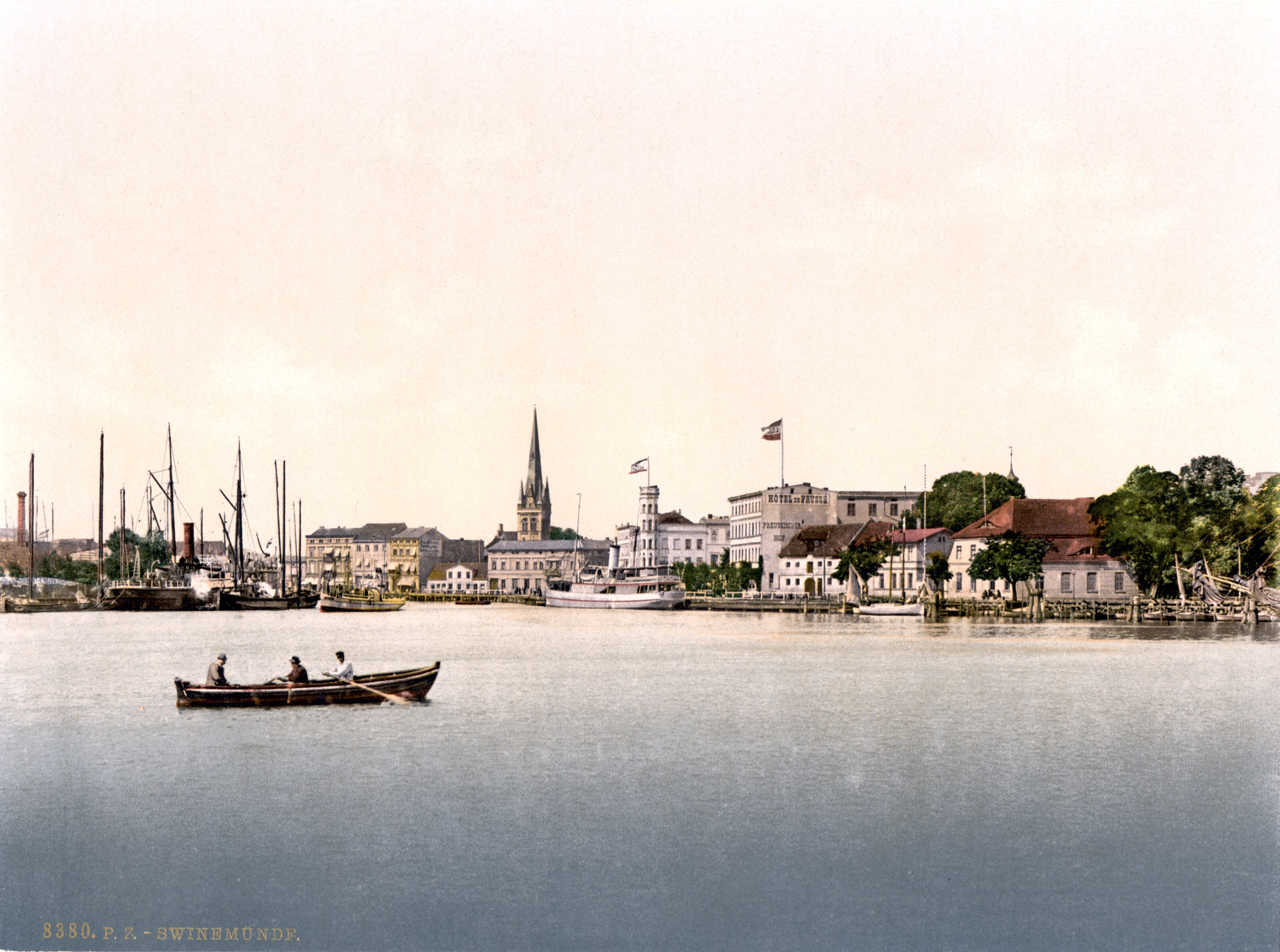
Late-19th-century panorama

The town had broad, unpaved streets and one-story houses built in the Dutch style, which gave it an almost rustic appearance. Its industries, beyond some fishing, were entirely connected with its shipping. The river mouth, which was the entrance to the harbor and regarded as the best on the Prussian Baltic coast, was then protected by two curving long breakwaters, and was strongly fortified. On the island of Wolin, on the other side of the narrow Świna, a great lighthouse was erected. In 1897 the canal of the Kaiserfahrt was opened to navigation, and this waterway between the Stettin harbour and the Baltic Sea was deepened between 1900 and 1901. From then on Stettin could be reached directly by ships, and Swinemünde's importance diminished somewhat.

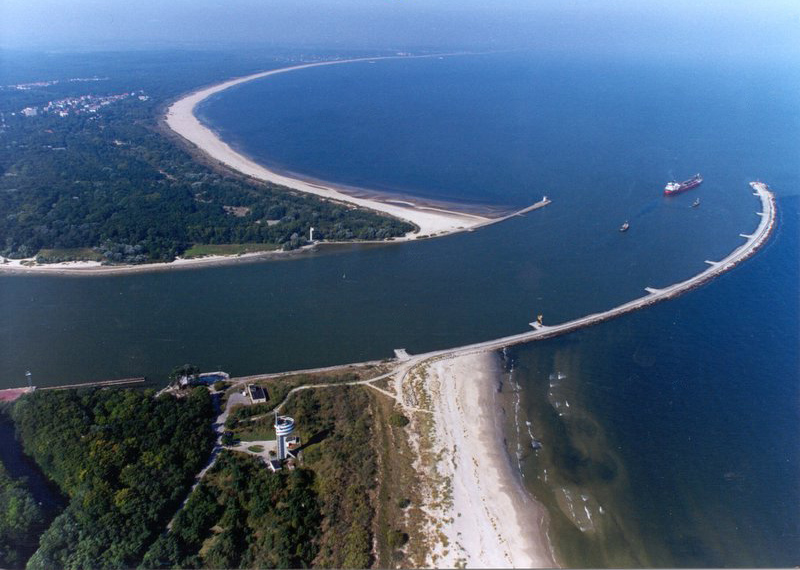
The river mouth of Świna at the Baltic Sea, separating the islands of Usedom (in the background) and Wolin (in the foreground). The city's name translates as "Świnamouth" both in Polish and German, akin to Dartmouth or Plymouth in English

During World War II, Germany operated a forced labour subcamp of the Stalag II-D prisoner-of-war camp in the city. In February 1945, German-perpetrated death marches of Allied prisoners of war from the Stalag XX-B and Stalag Luft IV POW camps passed through the city. On 12 March 1945 during World War II, refugee-crowded Swinemünde suffered heavy destruction by the USAAF, an estimated 5,000 to 23,000 were killed, most of whom are buried on the Golm War Cemetery west of the town, on the German side of the border. The city and port were also destroyed during the Allied air raids on 12 March and 16 April 1945. On 16 April 1945, a British heavy bomber of the No. 617 Squadron RAF was shot down by the Germans, and is now commemorated with a memorial on the Karsibór island within the city limits. The unfinished German aircraft carrier Graf Zeppelin was scuttled in the harbor in an attempt to prevent its capture by the advancing Red Army (it was nevertheless refloated by the Soviets later). The German battleship Schlesien had also participated in the defence of the city, before it too was scuttled. After the German forces defending the city were evacuated, Soviet forces occupied the city on the night of 4–5 May 1945.

After Germany's defeat in the war, Polish administrations had also established themselves in Swinemünde, but were forced to withdraw by the Soviet occupying forces. A post-war German administration was also established. When the Polish made a third attempt to take over administration in early July, the Soviets no longer resisted. At the Allied Nations imposed new borders in Central and Eastern Europe at the Potsdam Conference. Initial plans for the German-Polish border had the border line run “through” Swinemünde. However, during the negotiations in Potsdam, this was changed to “immediately west of Swinemünde” at Stalin’s request. The entire German population was expelled and Poles repopulated the city. The Treaty of Zgorzelec signed between the People's Republic of Poland and the German Democratic Republic affirmed, under Soviet pressure, the new border, and the German–Polish Border Treaty of 1990 officially affirmed the existing borders after the fall of the Iron Curtain.

In the winter of 1945, some members of the communist Polish Security Forces carried out atrocities against local Germans. An investigation in 2008 estimated that over 40 German civilians were killed. Nine men were charged with the murder and maltreatment of Germans, and in 1947, after one escaped and one hanged himself, seven of them stood trial. The harshest sentence given in that trial was four years' imprisonment, for theft. In another trial, the town's chief of police, Jan Zientara, was sentenced to eight years, for organizing robberies of German civilians.

In 1948, the reconstruction of the port of Świnoujście from martial to commercial and fishing began. The construction of a large fish farm began, a huge swimming pool and industrial buildings were built, and three years later the Fisheries Base was commissioned. Within three years, a large fish factory was established, managed by the independent Przedsiębiorstwo Usług Rybackie Odra in Świnoujście.

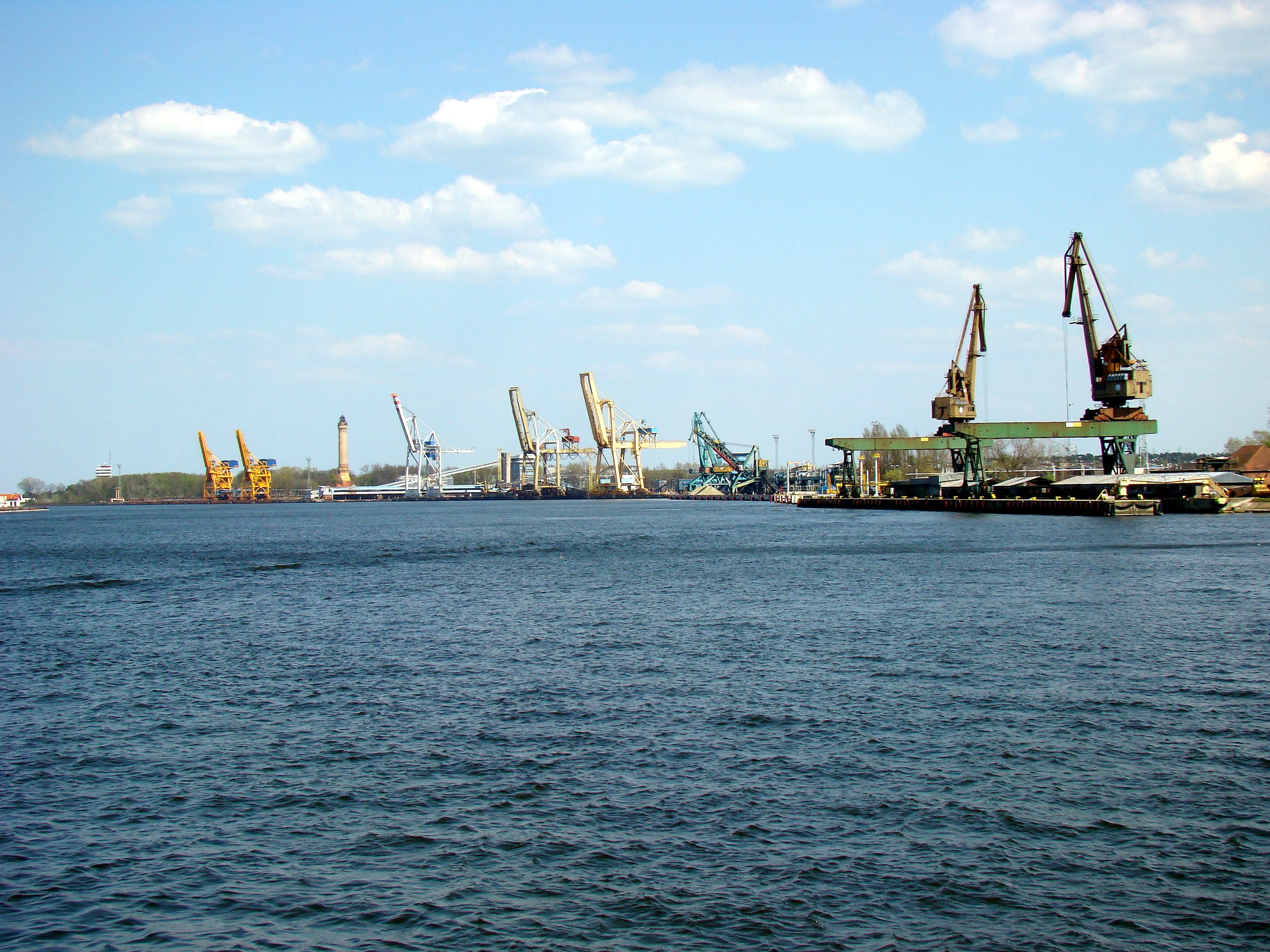
Port of Świnoujście

The port of Świnoujście was one of the three Polish ports through which Greeks and Macedonians, refugees of the Greek Civil War, reached Poland. The refugees were then transported to new homes in Poland, while wounded ones were sent to a nearby hospital on the Wolin island.

It was not until 27 November 1950, that the GDR government agreed to transfer to Poland the water intake for the city of Świnoujście, located at Lake Wolgastsee and demarcating the border there again. In June 1951, an area of 76.5 hectares (189 acres) was incorporated into Poland together with a water treatment station, creating a characteristic promontory protruding into the German area (the so-called Worek, (53 54 49.11 N 14 11′11.18 E). In return, Germany was granted a similar area between the water intake and the Pomeranian Bay.

The spa part of the city was occupied by the Soviet Armed Forces until 1957, and until the turn of the 1980s and 1990s, there was a base of Soviet warships with facilities in Świnoujście. Until 1972, the city belonged to the Wolin poviat. In 1959, the "Uzdrowisko Świnoujście" State Enterprise was established. Currently Uzdrowisko Świnoujście S.A. belongs to the largest and most modern in Poland, and its greatest asset is still bromide-iodide-sodium brine discovered a hundred years ago.

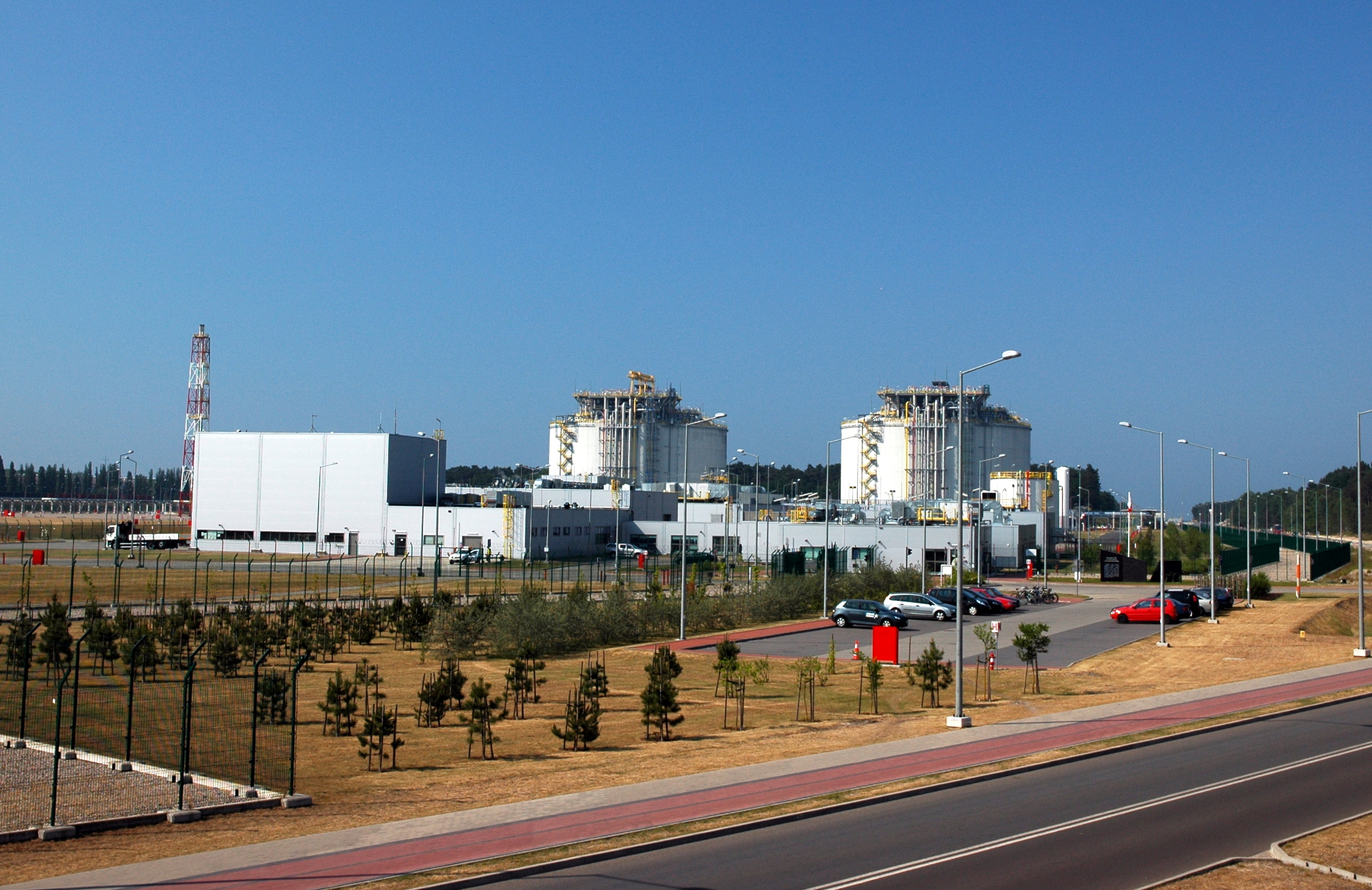
Świnoujście LNG terminal

In the 1960s and 1970s, a seaport was created, which together with Szczecin created a complex of ports Szczecin-Świnoujście. In 1964, ferry shipping to Scandinavia was resumed. From 1975 to 1998, it was administratively part of the Szczecin Voivodeship.

In 2015, the Świnoujście LNG terminal was opened, named after the late Polish President Lech Kaczyński, during whose presidency its construction was initiated.

== Geography ==
The city is located on the Strait of Świna, which in its northern part connects with the Baltic Sea, and in the south with the Szczecin Lagoon. It is situated on three inhabited islands: Usedom (35,712 inhabitants in 2010), Wolin (4,317 inhabitants), Karsibór (703 inhabitants) and 41 smaller uninhabited islands. Świnoujście is located in the northwestern edge of the West Pomeranian Voivodeship (with coordinates 53 ° 54′N 14 ° 14′E). According to data from 1 January 2024, the area of the urban commune is 202.7 km^{2} (78.3 sq mi). Every year, the city's area increases by applying sand on the beach by sea currents. Sands settling at the shore caused the shoreline to shift by 1.5 km (0.93 mi) over the last 200 years. Currently, the beach in the widest section is 200 meters (660 ft), making the beach in Świnoujście the widest beach in Poland.

=== Climate ===
Świnoujście is situated in the oceanic climate, which is characterized by mild winters and relatively cool summers. A very large influence on the climate of the city is the location of the Baltic Sea. Świnoujście is often the warmest city in Poland during winter.

Climate data for Świnoujście (1991–2020 normals, extremes 1951–present)
Month	Jan	Feb	Mar	Apr	May	Jun	Jul	Aug	Sep	Oct	Nov	Dec	Year
Record high °C (°F)	15.0 (59.0)	17.4 (63.3)	24.2 (75.6)	29.0 (84.2)	32.7 (90.9)	37.8 (100.0)	36.1 (97.0)	37.4 (99.3)	30.4 (86.7)	25.2 (77.4)	18.8 (65.8)	14.5 (58.1)	37.8 (100.0)
Mean daily maximum °C (°F)	2.9 (37.2)	4.1 (39.4)	7.3 (45.1)	12.2 (54.0)	16.6 (61.9)	20.3 (68.5)	22.6 (72.7)	22.8 (73.0)	18.6 (65.5)	13.0 (55.4)	7.3 (45.1)	3.9 (39.0)	12.6 (54.7)
Daily mean °C (°F)	0.8 (33.4)	1.4 (34.5)	3.8 (38.8)	7.9 (46.2)	12.2 (54.0)	15.9 (60.6)	18.2 (64.8)	18.2 (64.8)	14.5 (58.1)	9.7 (49.5)	5.1 (41.2)	1.9 (35.4)	9.1 (48.4)
Mean daily minimum °C (°F)	−1.3 (29.7)	−0.8 (30.6)	0.9 (33.6)	4.4 (39.9)	8.4 (47.1)	12.0 (53.6)	14.4 (57.9)	14.4 (57.9)	11.2 (52.2)	7.0 (44.6)	3.0 (37.4)	0.0 (32.0)	6.1 (43.0)
Record low °C (°F)	−21.6 (−6.9)	−23.6 (−10.5)	−16.8 (1.8)	−5.2 (22.6)	−1.7 (28.9)	2.8 (37.0)	7.0 (44.6)	6.4 (43.5)	2.6 (36.7)	−4.9 (23.2)	−10.3 (13.5)	−17.5 (0.5)	−23.6 (−10.5)
Average precipitation mm (inches)	43.5 (1.71)	33.5 (1.32)	38.6 (1.52)	30.8 (1.21)	51.8 (2.04)	60.3 (2.37)	72.9 (2.87)	60.4 (2.38)	54.9 (2.16)	48.6 (1.91)	45.2 (1.78)	44.6 (1.76)	585.1 (23.04)
Average extreme snow depth cm (inches)	4.1 (1.6)	5.3 (2.1)	2.8 (1.1)	0.4 (0.2)	0.0 (0.0)	0.0 (0.0)	0.0 (0.0)	0.0 (0.0)	0.0 (0.0)	0.1 (0.0)	0.6 (0.2)	3.1 (1.2)	5.3 (2.1)
Average precipitation days (≥ 0.1 mm)	16.13	15.31	14.13	11.07	12.40	12.93	14.10	13.03	13.03	14.83	15.47	17.37	169.81
Average snowy days (≥ 0 cm)	10.0	9.9	4.1	0.3	0.0	0.0	0.0	0.0	0.0	0.1	1.3	5.2	30.9
Average relative humidity (%)	88.2	85.3	81.5	78.0	78.2	77.3	78.7	78.6	81.7	85.4	89.6	89.7	82.7
Source 1: Institute of Meteorology and Water Management
Source 2: Meteomodel.pl (records, relative humidity 1991–2020)

== Population ==
Historical population

Year	Pop.	±%
1782	1,804	—
1794	2,077	+15.1%
1812	2,798	+34.7%
1831	3,538	+26.4%
1843	4,012	+13.4%
1852	4,752	+18.4%
1861	5,591	+17.7%
1875	7,977	+42.7%
1880	8,478	+6.3%

Year	Pop.	±%
1890	8,508	+0.4%
1900	10,300	+21.1%
1925	18,352	+78.2%
1933	20,514	+11.8%
1939	26,593	+29.6%
1947	5,800	−78.2%
1960	17,000	+193.1%
1970	28,100	+65.3%
1975	42,400	+50.9%

Year	Pop.	±%
1980	47,100	+11.1%
1990	43,300	−8.1%
1995	43,361	+0.1%
2000	43,697	+0.8%
2005	40,993	−6.2%
2010	40,759	−0.6%
2012	41,516	+1.9%
2024	38,700	−6.8%

Note: Międzyzdroje formed part of Świnoujście from 1972 to 1984

== Districts of Świnoujście ==
- Przytór
- Karsibór
- Wydrzany
- Łunowo
- Warszów
- Ognica

== Infrastructure ==
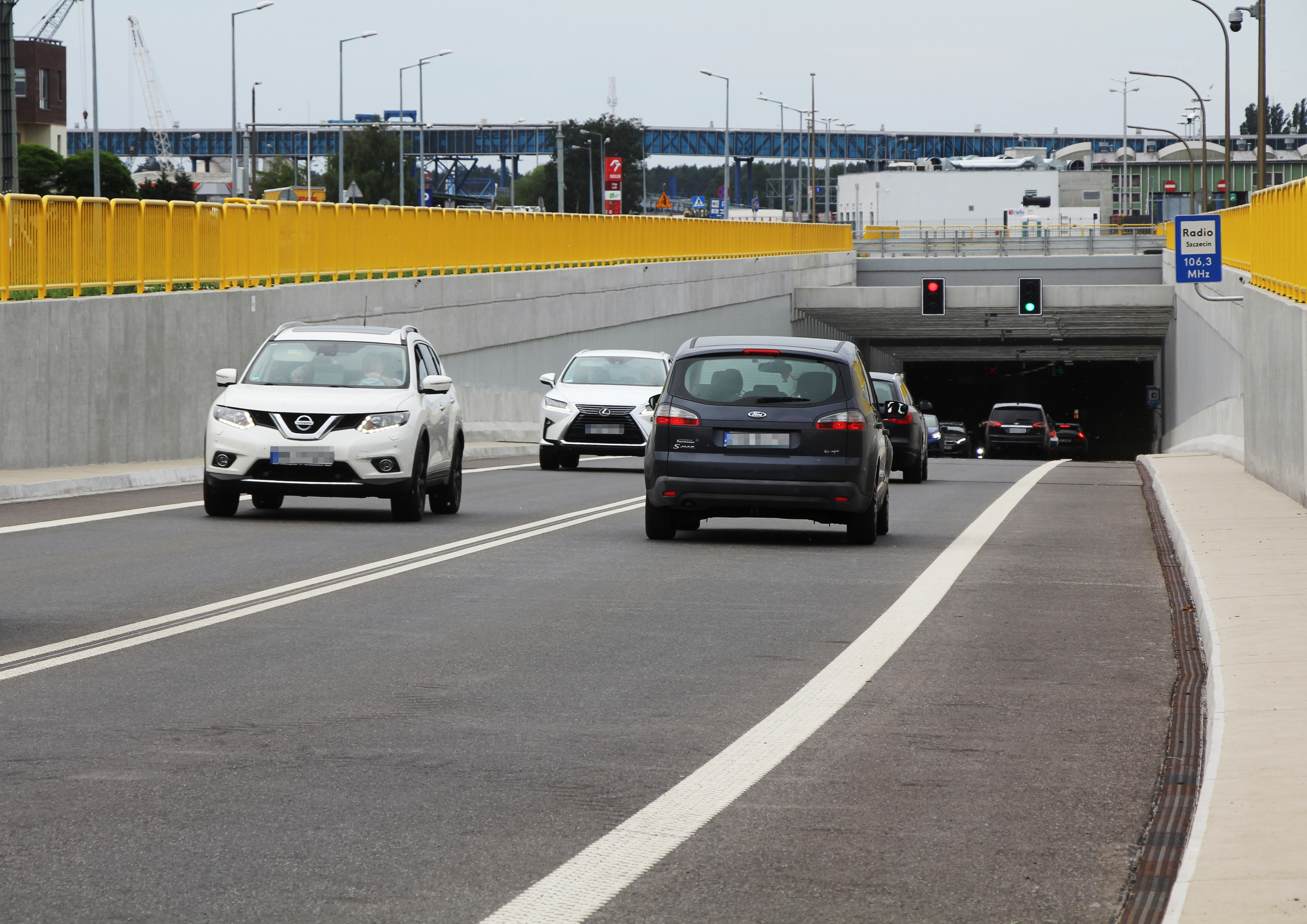
Świnoujście Tunnel connecting the islands of Wolin and Usedom

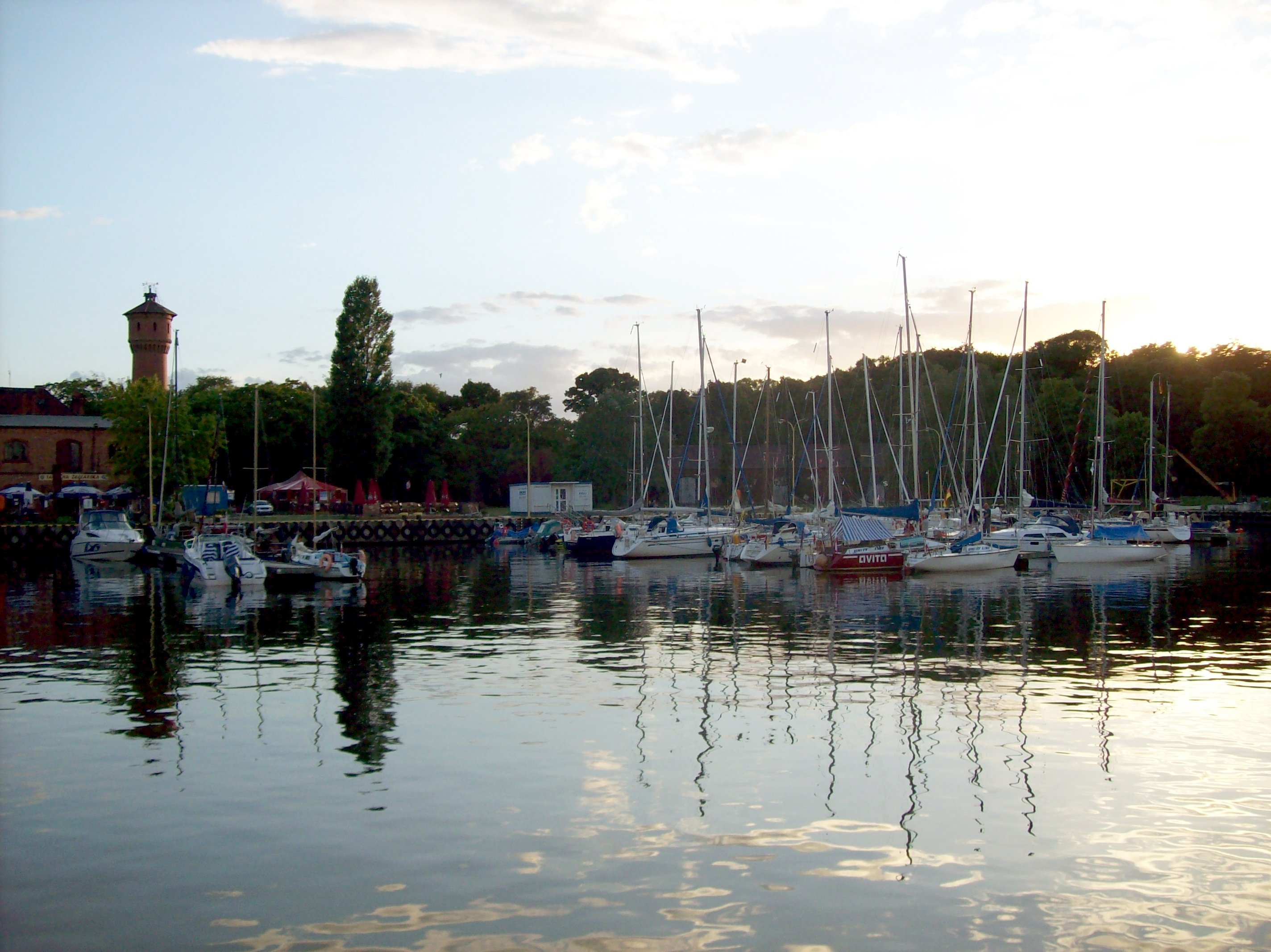
Marina in Świnoujście

=== Transport ===
==== Sea ====
The town is located on both banks of the Świna Channel, which are connected by regular ferries and the underwater Świnoujście Tunnel that was opened in 2023. The project cost EUR 191 million and constitutes the only fixed link between two parts of the city and between the rest of country.

Świnoujście has the largest and most modern ferry terminal in Poland, with regular connections to Denmark and Sweden. The city hosts the headquarters of POLSCA Baltic Ferries, a Polish maritime ferry operator. The city lies at the northern terminus of the S3 expressway, which is, in turn, part of the European route E65 running across Europe from Sweden to Greece.

==== Rail ====
Świnoujście is served by several railway stations: Świnoujście, Świnoujście Centrum, Świnoujście Port, Świnoujście Przytór, and Świnoujście Warszów, with regular regional services (Polregio) to Szczecin and long-distance services (PKP Intercity) to other cities in Poland; such as Poznań, Katowice, Bielsko-Biała, Kraków and Warsaw. Historically, numerous other railway stations have served the city, however these have since been either closed or replaced by existing ones.

==== Road ====
Land border controls were abolished 21 December 2007, and free automobile traffic to and from Germany was allowed for the first time since 1945, as Poland implemented the Schengen Agreement. From 20 September 2008, the city has a railway connection to its western portion as well, when the railway line to Ahlbeck was extended eastward to Świnoujście ("Świnoujście Centrum") giving it a direct link to the German railway network. The nearest airport at Heringsdorf in Germany, 13 kilometres (8 miles) west of Świnoujście, will likely become more important for travelling to the city, if it ever acquires year-round scheduled passenger connections; it currently has a number of summer connections to German cities only. The nearest airport with year-round traffic is the Szczecin-Goleniów "Solidarność" Airport, 80 km (50 mi) to the southeast in Poland.

==== Air ====
The city does not have an airport. The nearest airport is Heringsdorf Airport in Germany located 11 km (7 mi) south west. However, the airport only provides some direct routes to other parts of Germany, Luxembourg and Switzerland. If residents want to fly to other domestic destinations in Poland, they would need to fly from Solidarity Szczecin-Goleniów Airport as it provides air services to Warsaw which are operated by LOT Polish Airlines. The airport is located 76 km (47 mi) south east of Świnoujście.

== Tourist attractions ==
Sights of Świnoujście (examples)

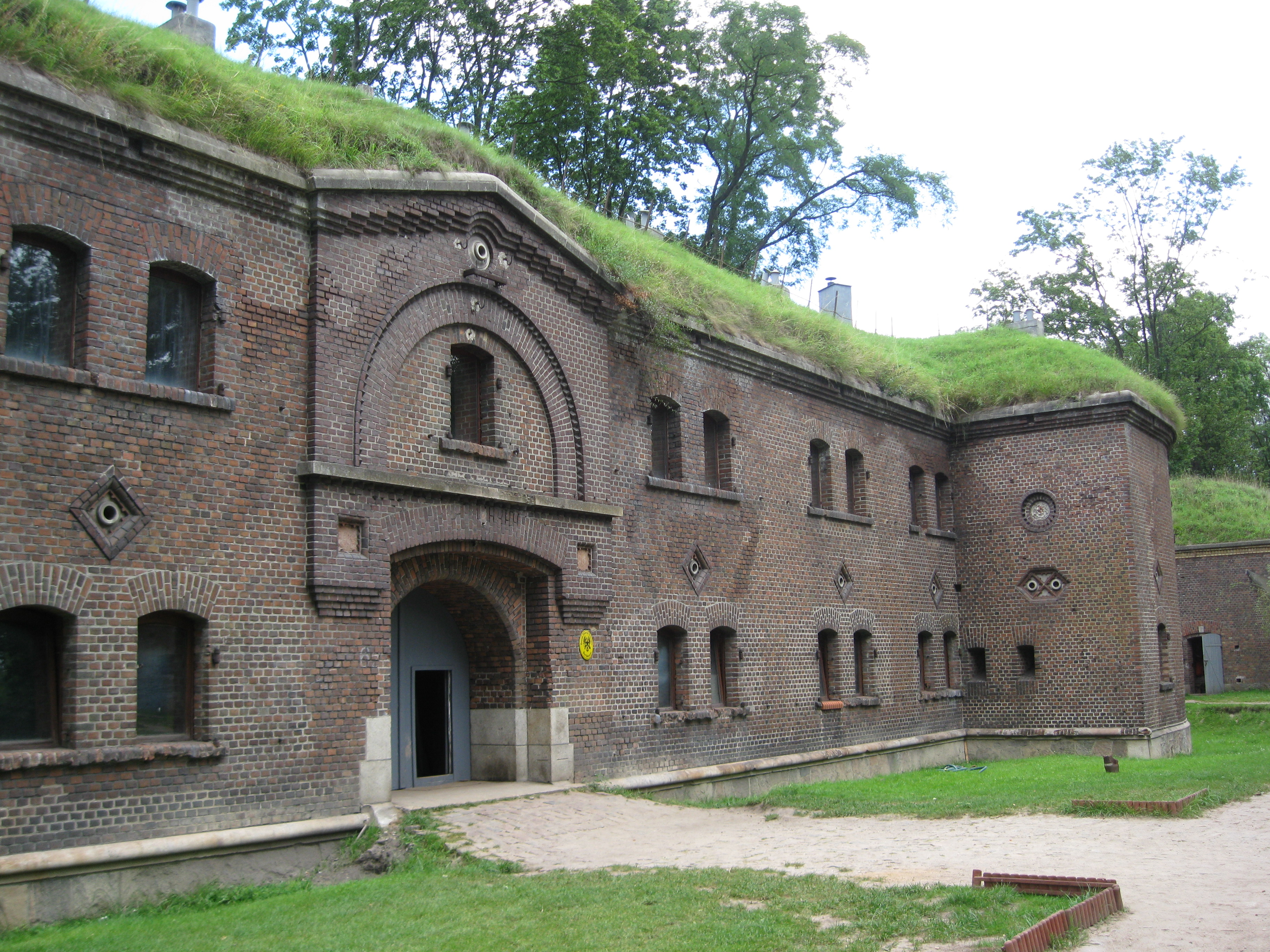
Eastern Fort

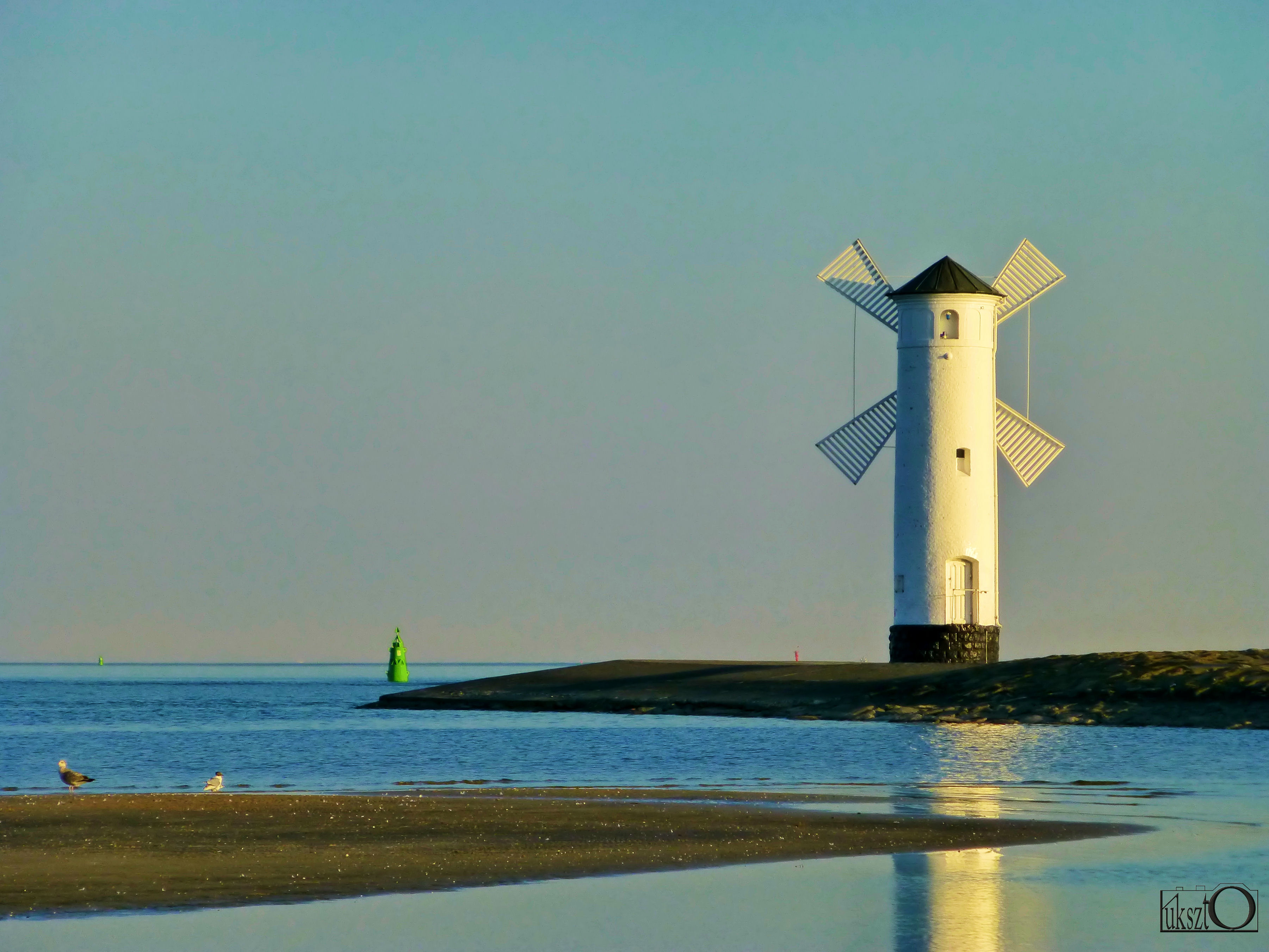
Stawa Młyny

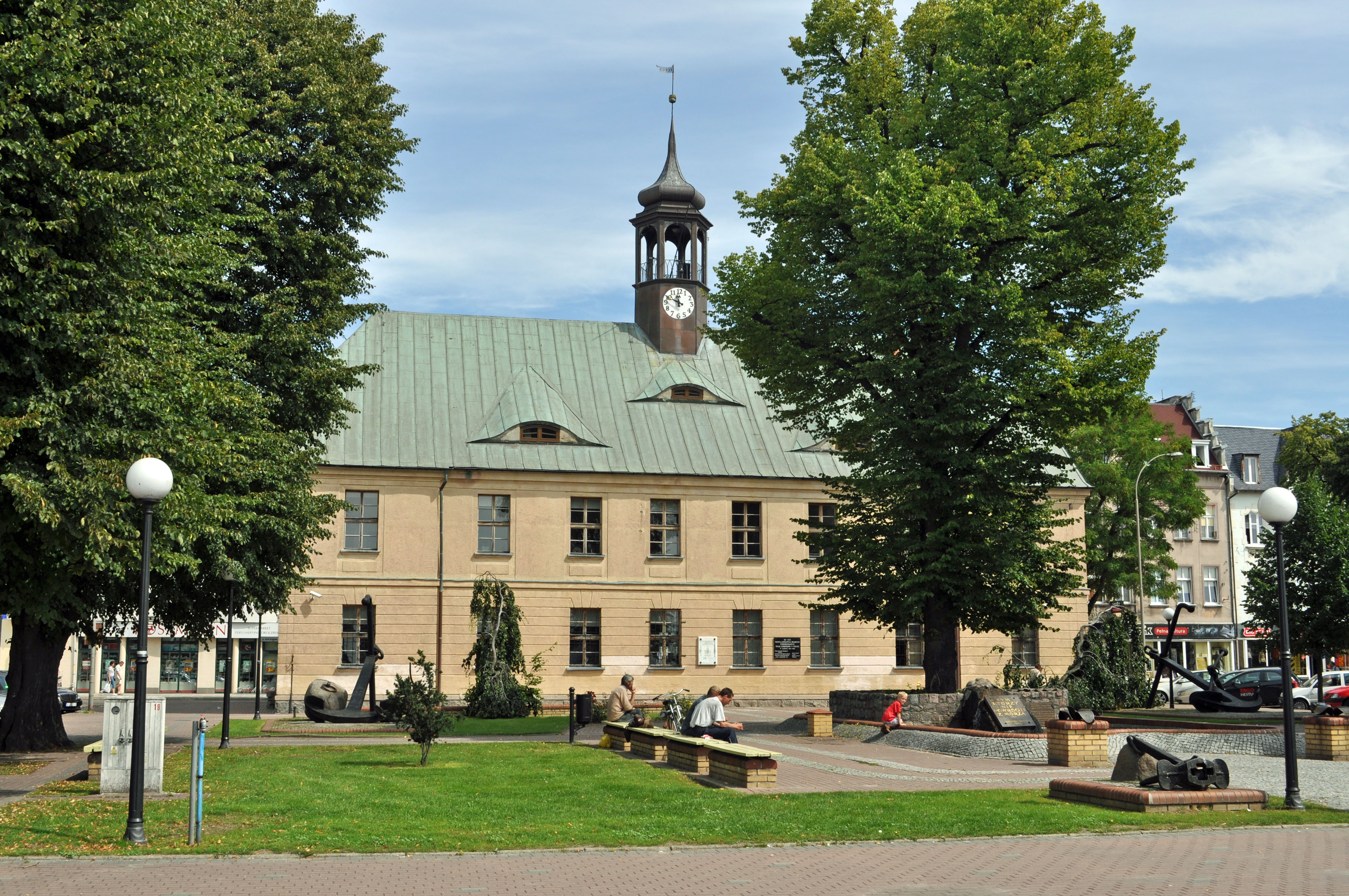
Museum of Deep Sea Fishing

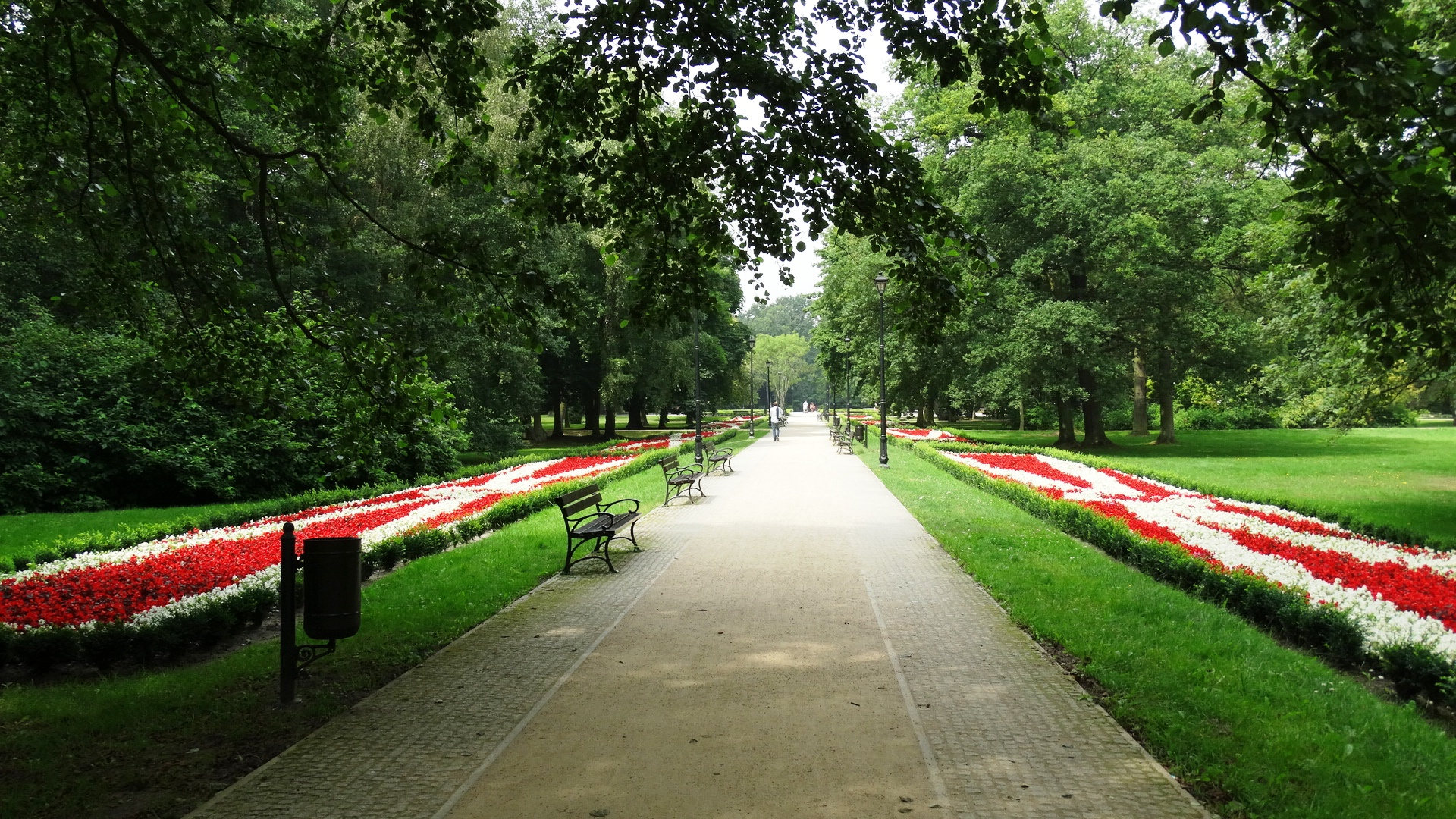
Park Zdrojowy

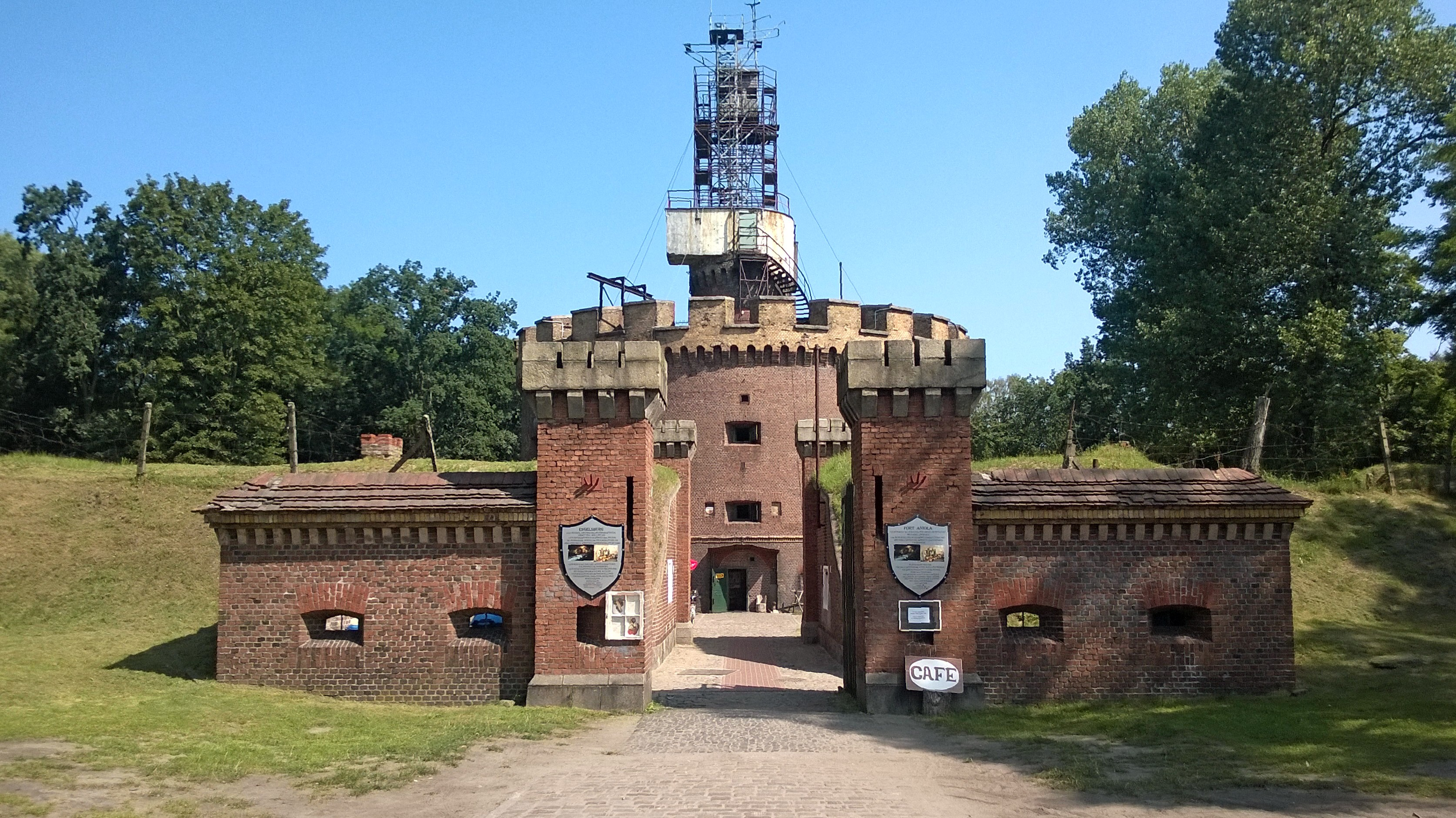
Angel's Fort

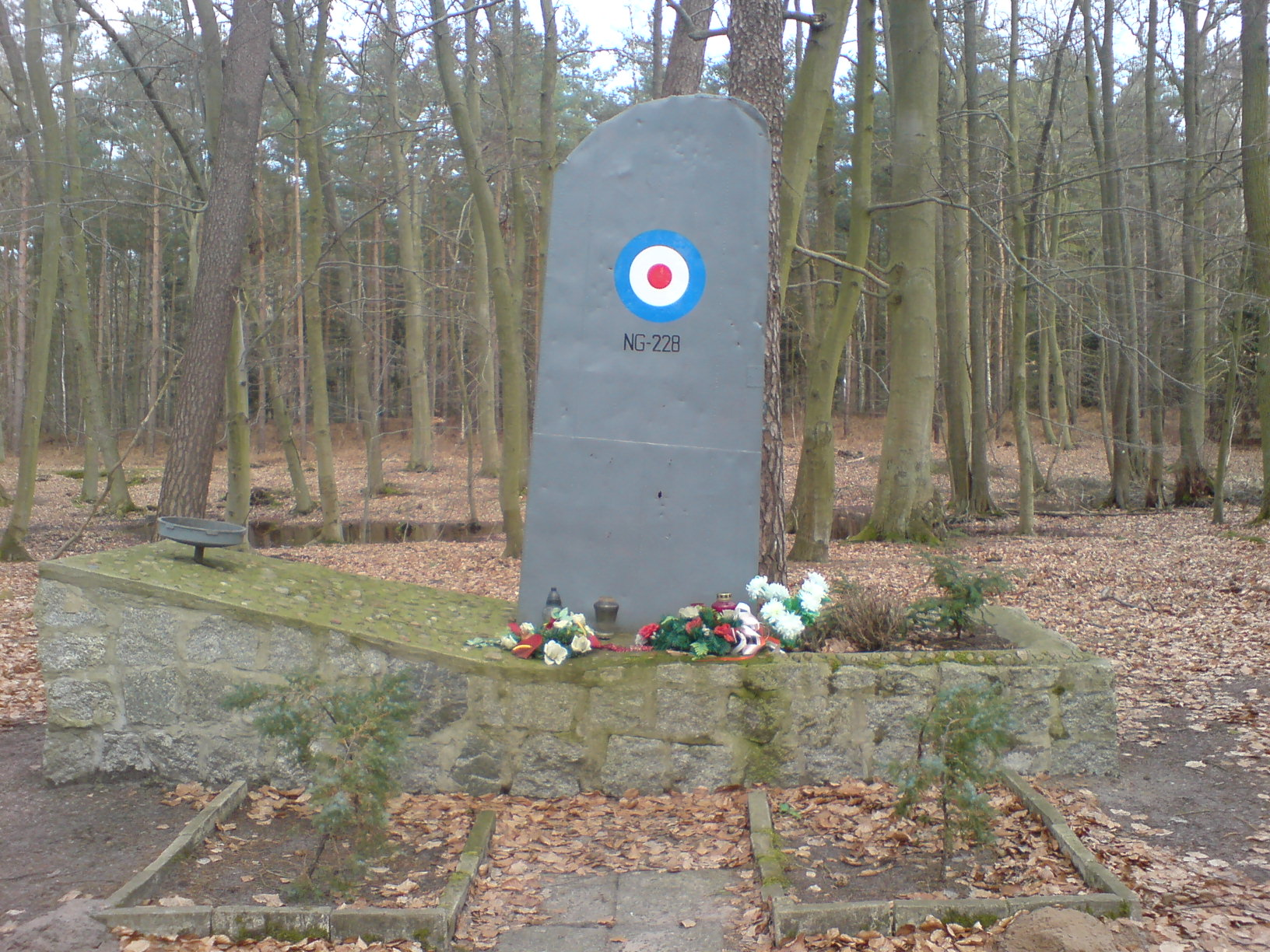
Memorial of the Royal Air Force pilots

- The former town hall houses the Museum of Deep Sea Fishing. Exhibits include the history of sea fishing, sea animals, the town and its region, and old navigation equipment.
- The Angel's Fort, built from 1845 to 1858, is a replica of Hadrian's Mausoleum (Castel Sant'Angelo in Rome).
- Concerts and art exhibitions are held at the Western Fort. Built between 1843 and 1863, it has been modernized a few times in the past. From after World War II until 1962 it was a headquarters of the Red Army.
- The 18th Christ the King Church in the centre of the town was erected on the site of a Gothic temple. A wooden ship replica is in the main nave. Organ concerts are presented during the summer.
- The Świnoujście Lighthouse, built in 1857, is at 68 metres (223 ft) the highest lighthouse in Poland and on the Baltic Sea, and it is also the highest brick lighthouse in the world.
- The Stawa Młyny is a navigation beacon built in the form of a windmill on the 19th century breakwater.
- The neo-Gothic church of the Holy Mother "Stella Maris" has stained glass windows of great artistic value. It was erected at the end of the 19th century.
- The Eastern Fort, or Gerhard's Fort, is one of three preserved forts from the 19th century. It houses the Coastal Defense Museum (Muzeum Obrony Wybrzeża), with an exhibition which presents the history of the town's forts, as well as objects found there.
- The Spa Park (Park Zdrojowy) is a historic public park in the western part of the city.
- The "well" is a preserved tower of a Protestant church damaged during World War II and demolished afterwards.
- A shelter built in 1942 has the exposition "The town yesterday and now", presenting pictures of the town's history and other exhibits.
- The district of Karsibór contains an Evangelical cemetery established in the first half of 19th century.
- The Gothic church from the 15th century contains an altar from the 15th century and a pulpit from the 17th century.
- A monument honours the memory of Royal Air Force pilots shot down by the Germans while raiding the town in April 1945, located on the Karsibór island.
- Karsiborska Kępa, an island within the city limits, contains a bird sanctuary with approximately 140 species.
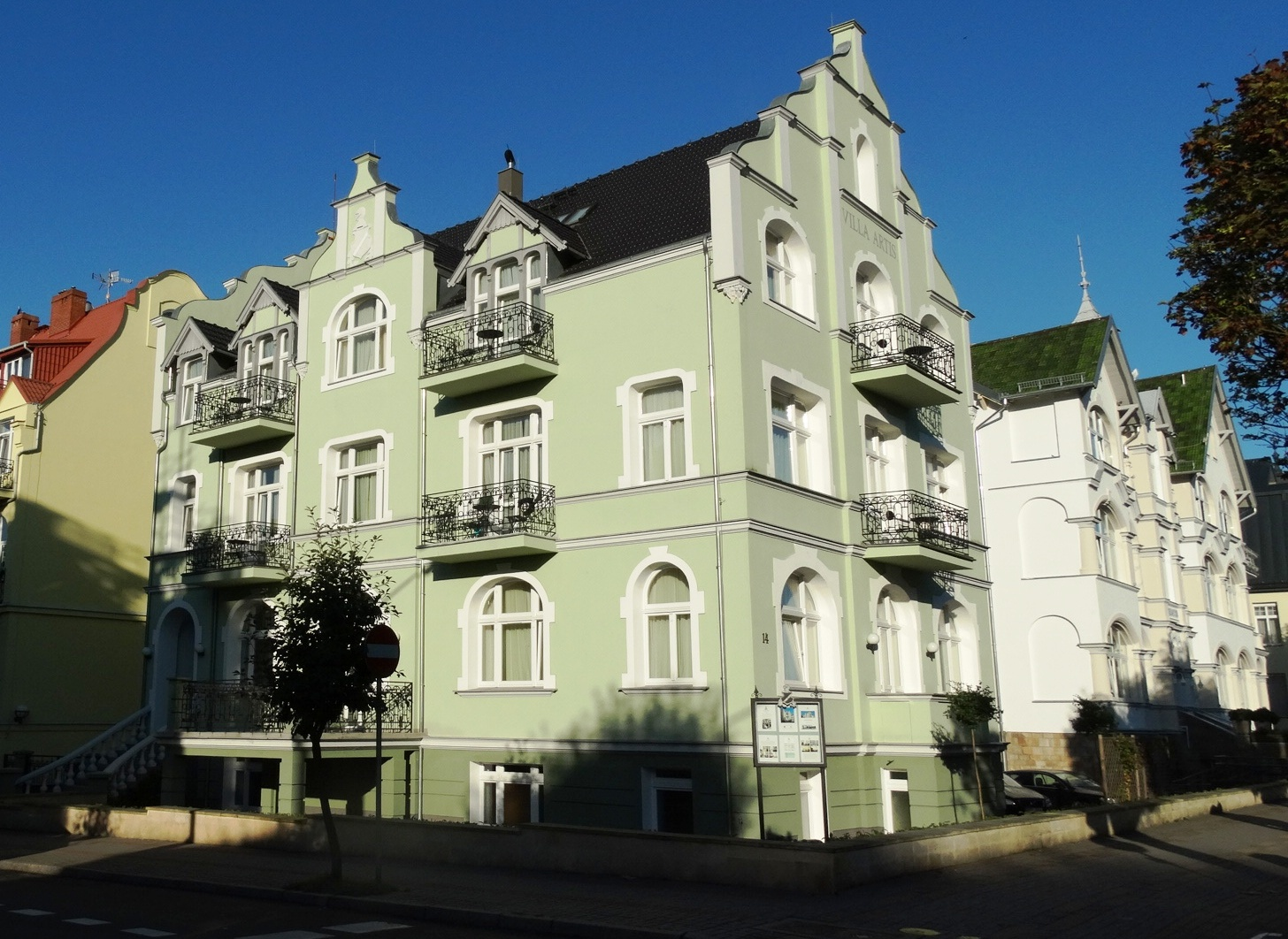
Historic seaside-resort architecture in Świnoujście

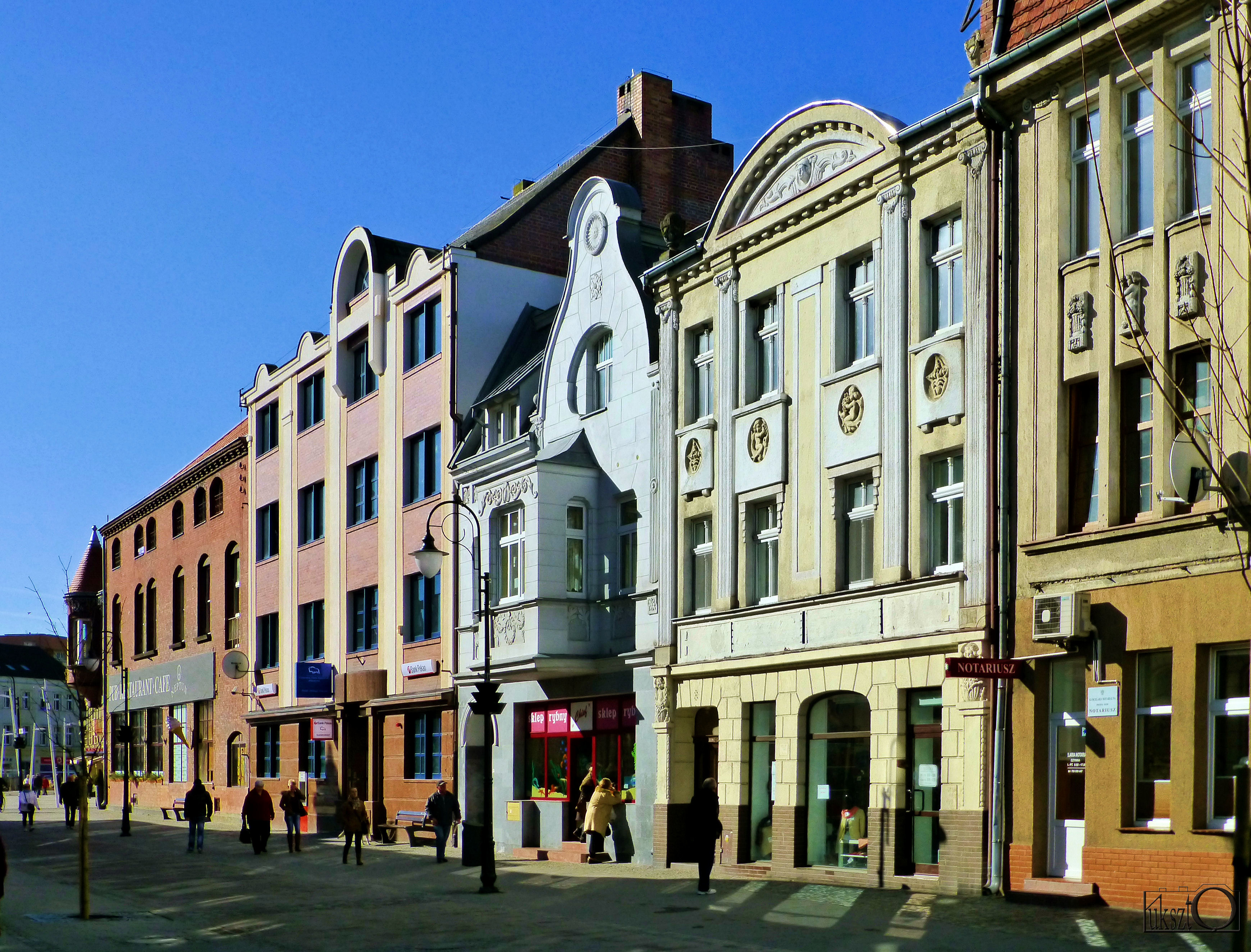
Colourful historic tenement houses at Piłsudskiego Street

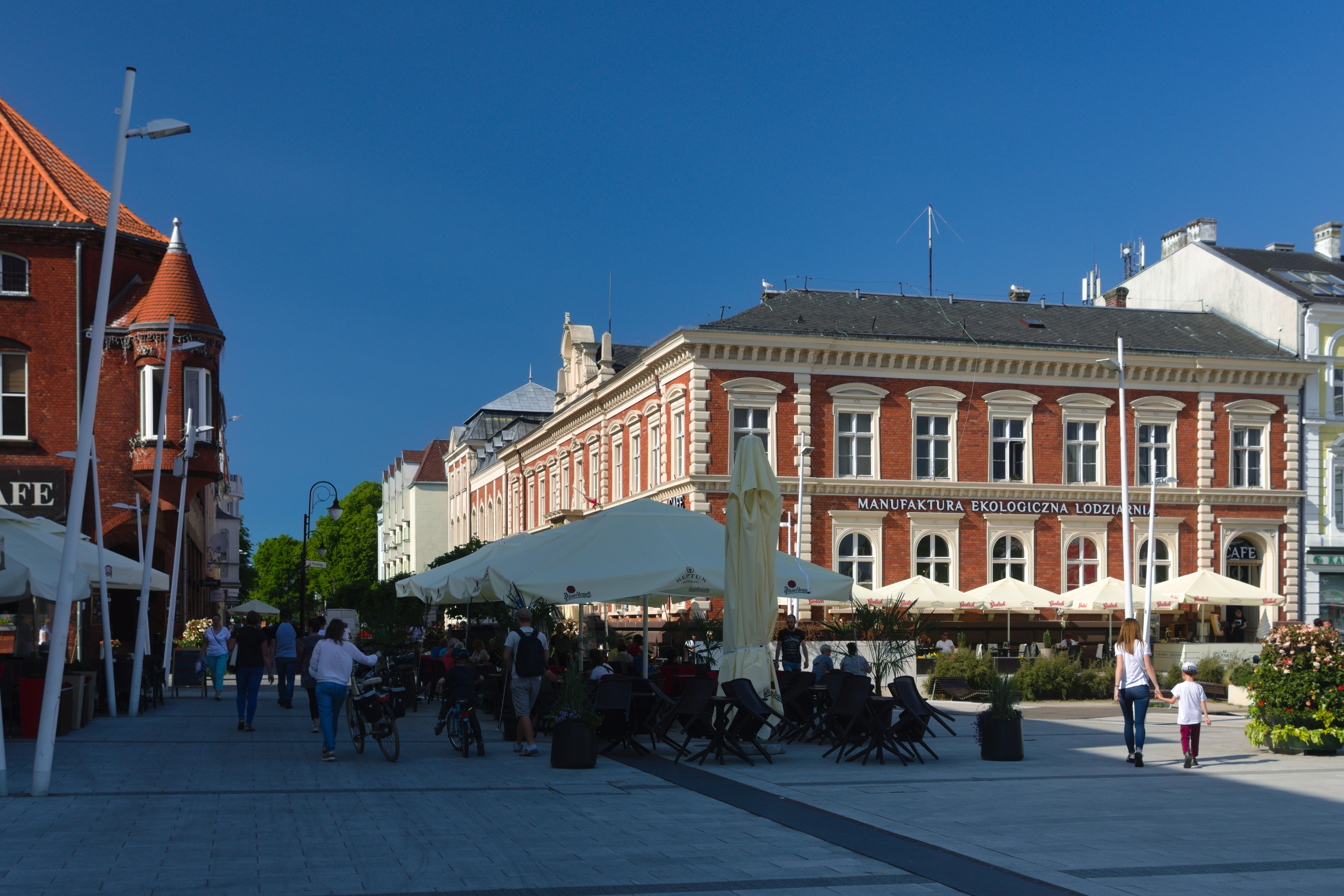
City center with the main post office

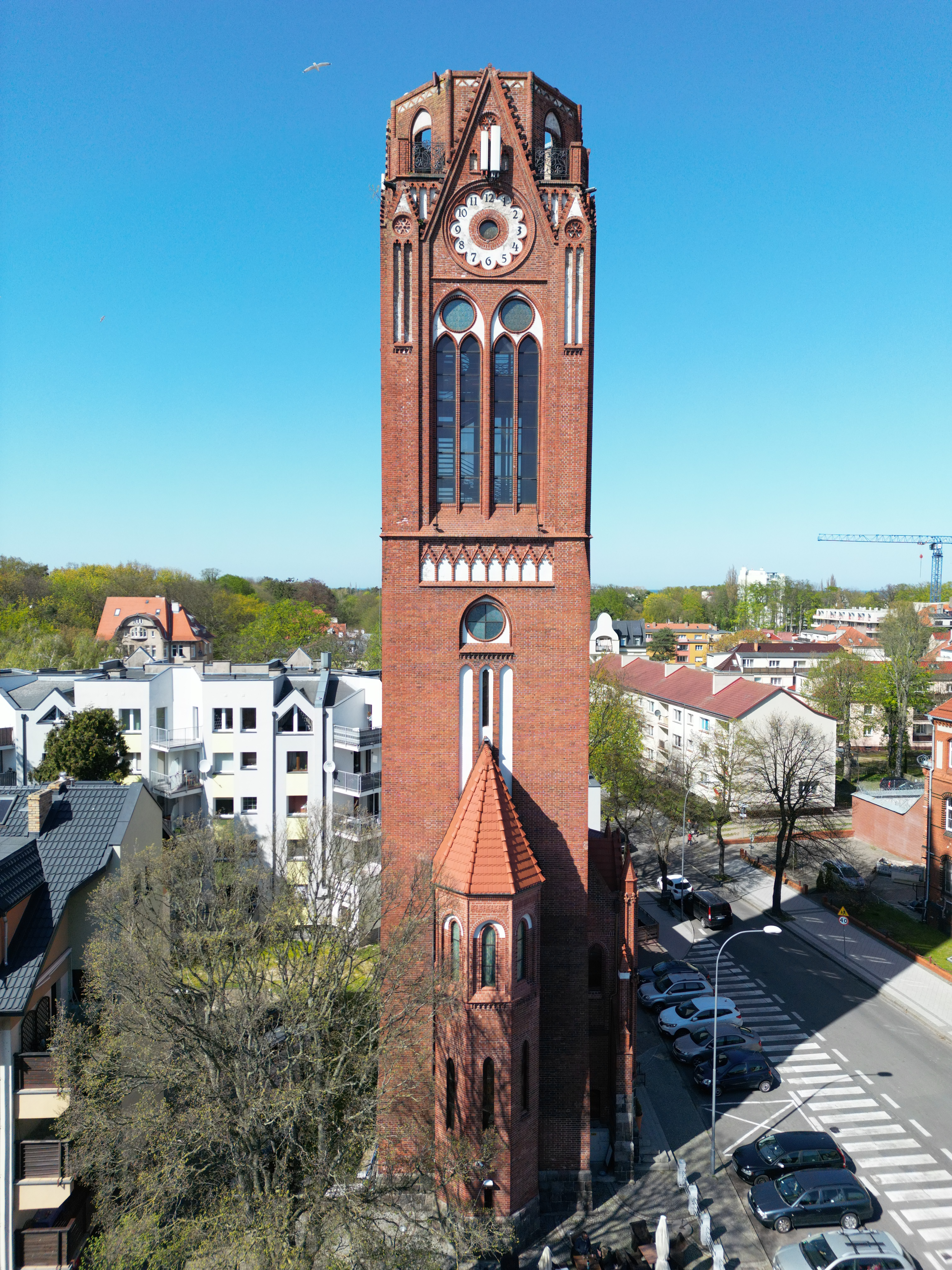
Martin Luther Church Tower

== International relations ==
=== Twin towns – Sister cities ===
Świnoujście is twinned with:

- Heringsdorf, Germany since 2007
- Nordenham, Germany since 1992
- Ostvorpommern, Germany since 1998
- Ystad, Sweden since 1990

=== Former twin towns ===
- Svetly, Russia since 1993 until 2022 (terminated due to the Russian invasion of Ukraine)

== Sports ==
- Flota Świnoujście – football club that competes in the lower leagues, but from 2008 to 2015 it played in the I liga (second tier)
- Prawobrzeże Świnoujście – football club that competes in the lower leagues
- A weekly free 5 km (3.1 mi) Parkrun takes place in Świnoujście.

== Notable people ==
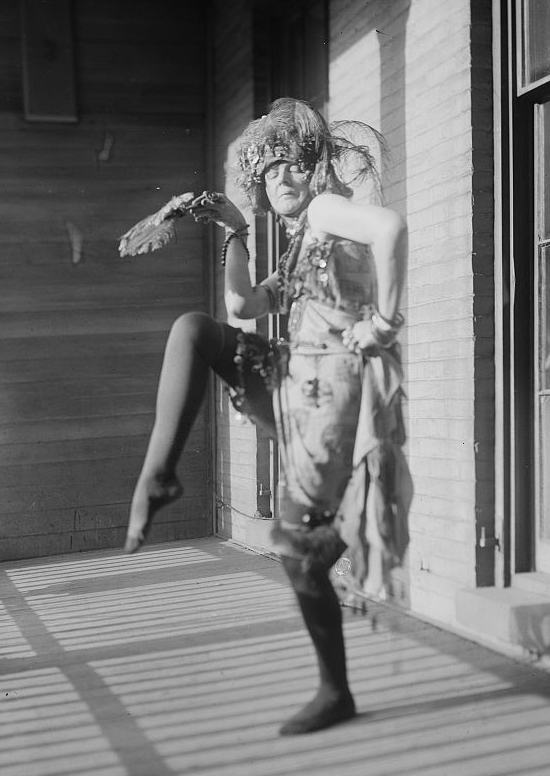
Elsa von Freytag-Loringhoven

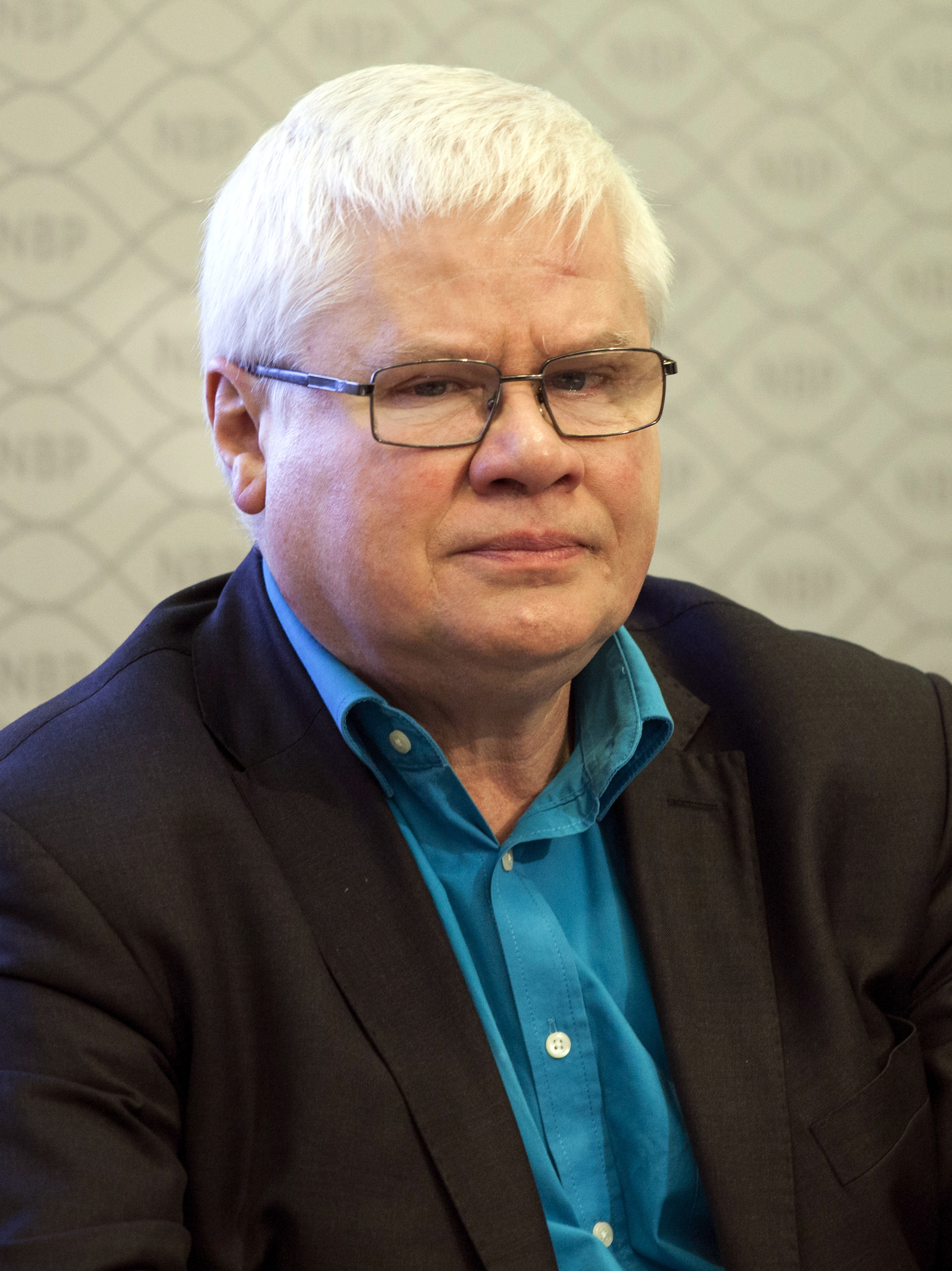
Jerzy Hausner

- Theodor Fontane (1819–1898) German writer, lived here for several years as a child and described the town in his writings
- Klara Bauer (1836–1876), a German novelist.
- Alfred Ploetz (1860–1940) a German physician, biologist and eugenicist, coined the term racial hygiene
- Georg Kropp (1865–1943) a German journalist and polymath. He co-founded Germany's first mutual building society
- Elsa von Freytag-Loringhoven (1874–1927) a German avant-garde Dadaist artist and poet
- Christel Peters (1916–2009) a German actress
- Jürgen Harder (1918–1945) a German Luftwaffe fighter ace
- Hans-Werner Grosse (1922–2021) a German record-breaking glider pilot & Luftwaffe pilot
- Gisela Stein (1935–2009) a German actress
- Hans Jürgen Todt (born 1937) a German modern pentathlete, competed at the 1968 Summer Olympics
- Konrad Kwiet (born 1941) a historian and scholar of the Holocaust
- Jerzy Hausner (born 1949) a Polish politician, economist and member of the 4th Sejm
- Andrzej Smolik (born 1970) a Polish musician, composer, music producer and multi-instrumentalist
- Anna Harkowska (born 1980) a Polish cyclist, competed at the 1992 Summer Paralympics as a swimmer, and as a cyclist at the 2012 Summer Paralympics, where she won three silver medals.
- Michał Ruciak (born 1983) a Polish volleyball player, national volleyball team member

== See also ==
- Ports of the Baltic Sea
