= Christel Peters =

German actress

- Born: 15 January 1916; Swinemünde, Pomerania, Imperial Germany, (now Świnoujście, Poland)
- Died: 11 June 2009 (aged 93); Brandenburg an der Havel, Germany
- Occupation: German actress
- Years active: 1920 - 2006

Christel Peters (15 January 1916 – 11 June 2009) was a German actress.

== Biography ==
Peters was born in Swinemünde, Germany (now Świnoujście, Poland) as a child of an actor's family and started to appear on a stage in the age of four. Peters worked at several stages and became known to a wider audience after the German reunification by several TV productions and especially through her appearance as the "Mother of all bargains" (Mutter aller Schnäppchen) in an advertising campaign.

== Selected filmography ==
- Nightshapes (1999)
- Now or Never: Time Is Money (2000)
- Vaya con Dios (2002)
- Summer in Berlin (2005)
