= Karsiborska Kępa =

Island in Świnoujście, Poland

Coordinates: 53.8622°N 14.3333°E

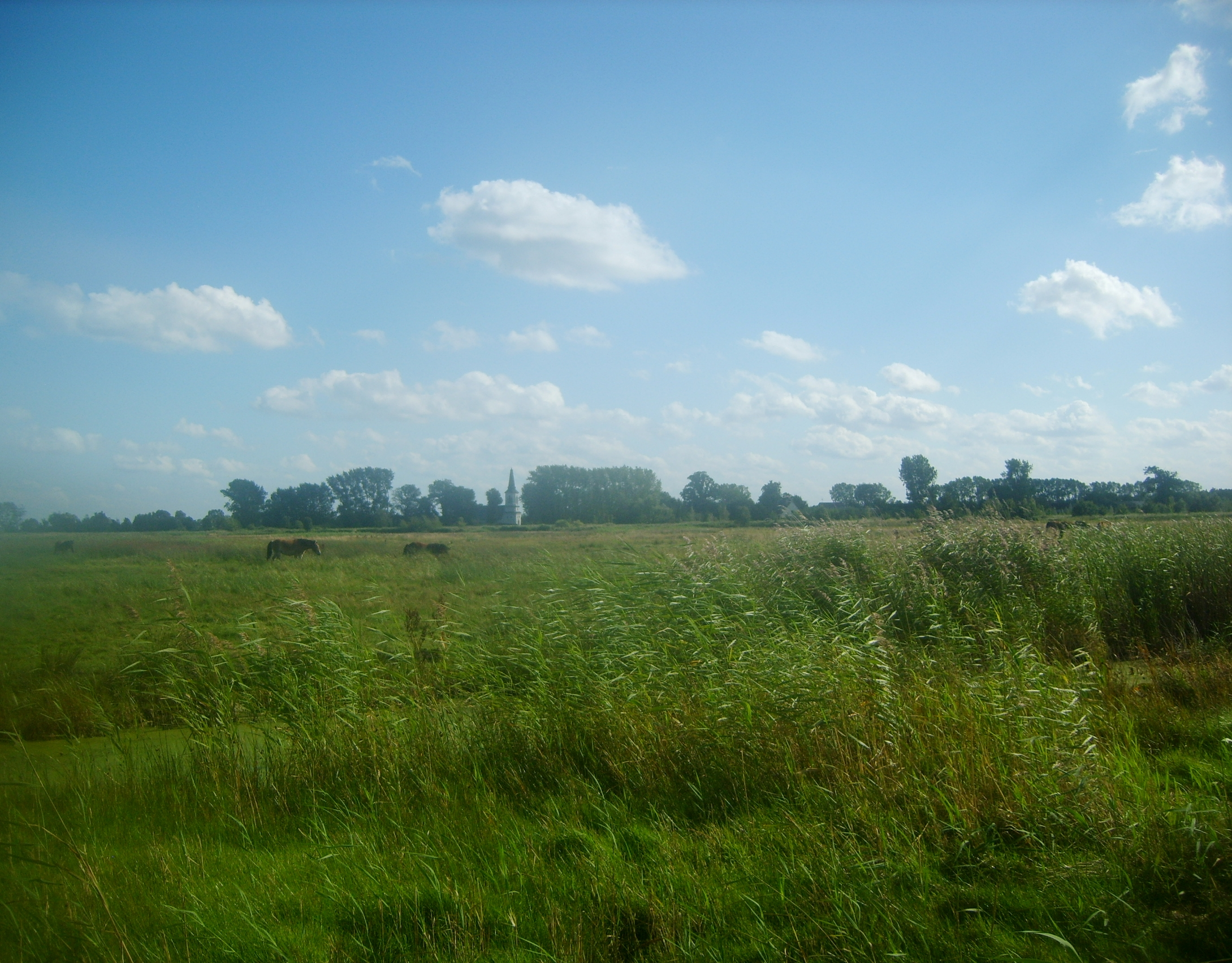

Karsiborska Kępa (formerly German: Kaseburger Hutung) is an island near Świnoujście in north-western Poland. It is also the name of a nature reserve and bird sanctuary on the island.

The island is known for being possibly the most important breeding area for the aquatic warbler. OTOP, the Polish Society for the Protection of Birds bought 1.8 square kilometres of the island. The whole island covers some 3 km^{2} and is the only reserve owned by OTOP. The number of aquatic warblers on the island depends on the water level and the available vegetation. There were between 55 singing males in the late 1990s. The island consists of large meadows, pastures, and it has large reed beds. Numerous other breeding birds include: marsh and Montagu's harriers, Eurasian curlew, common redshank and bearded tit. Other species include white-tailed eagle, black kite and lesser spotted eagle. On passage there are numerous flocks of geese, waterfowl, cranes and waders. The other forms of wildlife include wild boar and occasionally otter. The site is frequented by birders and is placed ideally for those driving to Poland via Germany.
