= Klara Bauer =

Polish novelist

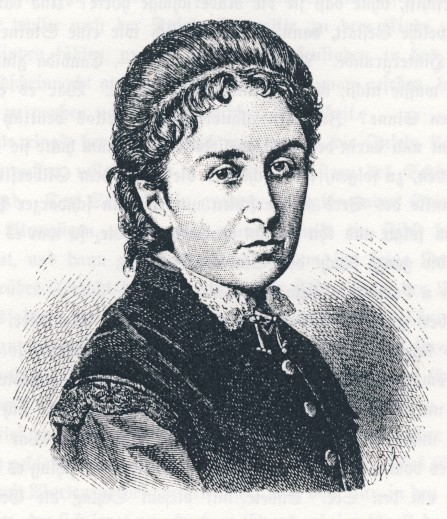
- Portrait of Bauer, 1885
- Born: 23 June 1836; Swinemünde, Province of Prussia, Kingdom of Prussia
- Died: 29 June 1876 (aged 40); Breslau, Province of Silesia, German Empire
- Occupation: Author
- Writing career
- Pen name: Karl Detlef
- Language: German
- Years active: 1871-76
- Period: Gründerzeit

Klara Bauer (23 June 1836 in Swinemünde – 29 June 1876 in Breslau) was a German novelist, who was a subject first of the Kingdom of Prussia and then of the German Empire. Often writing under her pseudonym Karl Detlef, she was best remembered for her novels Bis in die Steppe (1869), Unlösliche Bande (1869), Schuld und Sühne (1871), Mußte es sein? (1873), Auf Capri (1874), Benedikta (1876), and Die geheimnisvolle Sängerin (1876).
