= Fortress Division Swinemünde =

Fortress Division Swinemunde
- Festungs-Division Swinemünde
- Active: January - May 1945
- Country: Nazi Germany
- Branch: Army; Navy; Air Force
- Type: Infantry
- Garrison/HQ: Swinemünde

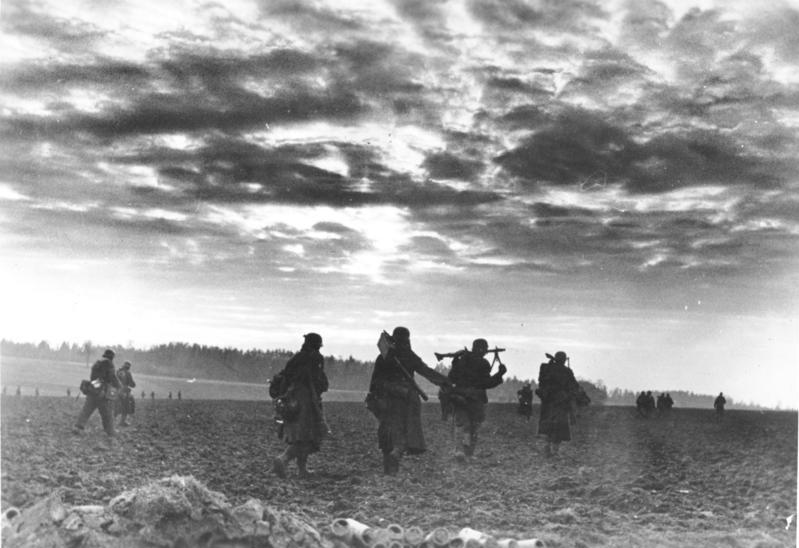
On the German-Soviet Front, early March 1945

Fortress Division Swinemünde was an ad hoc formation under the command of Baron Hermmann Von Pfel, and organized by Seekommandant Pommern (Naval Command Pomerania) in the port of Swinemünde. The division was created in 1945 primarily from Kriegsmarine personnel, although some Luftwaffe personnel were used as well. The Army component of the Swinemünde fortress division was destroyed by the Soviet 5th Guards Army in Lower Silesia near Breslau.

The city of Swinemünde was encircled by the Soviet 2nd Belorussian Front, with the 2nd Shock Army attacking from the west and the 19th Army attacking from the east. After the Kriegsmarine (navy) reported on 28 April 1945 that the port was no longer of any use, the Germans prepared to evacuate their forces. The evacuation, Operation Knobelbecher, took place from 1–4 May 1945, and shipped the German troops to Denmark, where they were taken captive by the British Army. Soviet forces occupied the city of Swinemünde during 4–5 May 1945.

== Bibliography ==
- Tessin, Georg (1980). Die Landstreitkräfte: Namensverbände / Die Luftstreitkräfte (Fliegende Verbände) / Flakeinsatz im Reich 1943–1945 [Ground forces: Named units and formations / Air forces (Flying units and formations) / Anti–aircraft service in the Reich 1943–1945] (in German). Vol. 14. Osnabrück: Biblio. ISBN 3-7648-1111-0.
- Schön, Heinz (1995). "Die letzen Kriegstage Ostseehäfen 1945". Stuttgart: Motorbuch Verlag. ISBN 3-613-01654-0.
