= Hans Jürgen Todt =

German modern pentathlete

Personal information
- Born: 6 July 1937 (age 88) Swinemünde, Germany (now Świnoujście, Poland)
- Height: 186 cm (6 ft 1 in)
- Weight: 75 kg (165 lb)

Sport
- Sport: Modern pentathlon

Hans Jürgen Todt (born 6 July 1937) is a German modern pentathlete. He competed for West Germany at the 1968 Summer Olympics. Todt finished 46th, as he and his horse scored 0 points in the steeplechase. With the West German team he came in 13th. In 1966 and 1967 Todt won the West German national title. By profession, he was a type setter.
