= Slow moving vehicle =

Vehicle operated at a lower speed than other traffic

A slow moving vehicle (or SMV) is a vehicle or caravan of vehicles operated on a street or highway at speeds slower than that of other motorized traffic.

The term "slow moving vehicle" is generally applied to equipment and vehicles such as farm equipment (including tractors), construction equipment, trucks towing trailers, or any such vehicles which cannot operate above a specified speed.

It does not include vehicles normally known to unlikely be operated at that speed or incapable of reaching that speed, such as bicycles, mopeds and disabled vehicles being towed.

== SMV emblem ==
=== North America ===
In the United States and Canada, an individual vehicle, a vehicle which is being towed, or caravans of vehicles which are unable to reach a maximum speed of 40 kilometres an hour (25 miles per hour) are required by law to display a special reflective emblem sign at the rear of the vehicle or vehicles, or on the rear vehicle in the caravan. The sign is only allowed to be placed where it is visible from the sides, front, or the rear of the vehicle.

The sign appears essentially as the image above, as a "cut" triangle consisting of a triangle with the corners cut off in red, as a border surrounding an orange uncut triangle in the center, with the edge separating the orange and red being black or white. The United States Department of Transportation as well as various Canadian provinces have established regulations that dictate the minimum required size of the sign, and grant exemptions for displaying the sign for certain religious groups having an objection to displaying a sign, which are operating horse-drawn carriages or wagons on public highways, provided they use an alternative reflective marking on the rear of the wagon or carriage. Vehicles which are merely crossing a road, such as a tractor going from one field directly to another at a 90-degree angle from the road, are not required to display the sign.

The sign must not be displayed so it is visible to a road from an object which is not a vehicle (like a mailbox, billboard, or structure), and vehicles not on a public road must remove or hide the sign if it can be seen from the road.

The slow-moving vehicle sign was developed based on a series of tests for shape recognition and color visibility by Kenneth Harkness of the Department of Agricultural Engineering at Ohio State University, with funding from the Automotive Safety Foundation.

In the United States, the sign is typically available from hardware, vehicle supply, and construction supply stores for about US$20.

In the United States, slow-moving Vehicle Emblem Requirements are defined in the 29 CFR 1910 Occupational Safety and Health Administration .145(d)(10) regulation. They are based on the American Society of Agricultural Engineers (ASAE) Emblem for Identifying Slow-Moving Vehicles, ASAE R276, 1967, or ASAE S276.2 (ANSI B114.1-1971).

In the British Columbia province of Canada, the device is named a "Slow Moving Vehicle Warning Device". It is standardized as C.S.A. Standard D 198-1967 by the Canadian Standards Association according to the Motor Vehicle Act Regulations.

=== Europe ===
In Europe, there is no one single "Slow moving vehicle" concept, but concepts depending on various national or international laws.

Most European countries apply the Vienna Convention on Road Traffic, but this convention on road traffic does not require vehicles not reaching a specific speed to carry a specific mark. Indeed, Vienna convention just defines such as the two red reflex-reflectors for trailers, and prohibits some class of roads or some kind to some moving vehicles not able by design to reach a specific speed defined by domestic legislation, for instance on motorways.

However, numerous European countries also apply Unece regulations. Regulation Unece number 69 address rear marking plates for slow-moving vehicles (by construction) and their trailers. Those marks have a shape like the north-American one.

==== Unece regulation ====
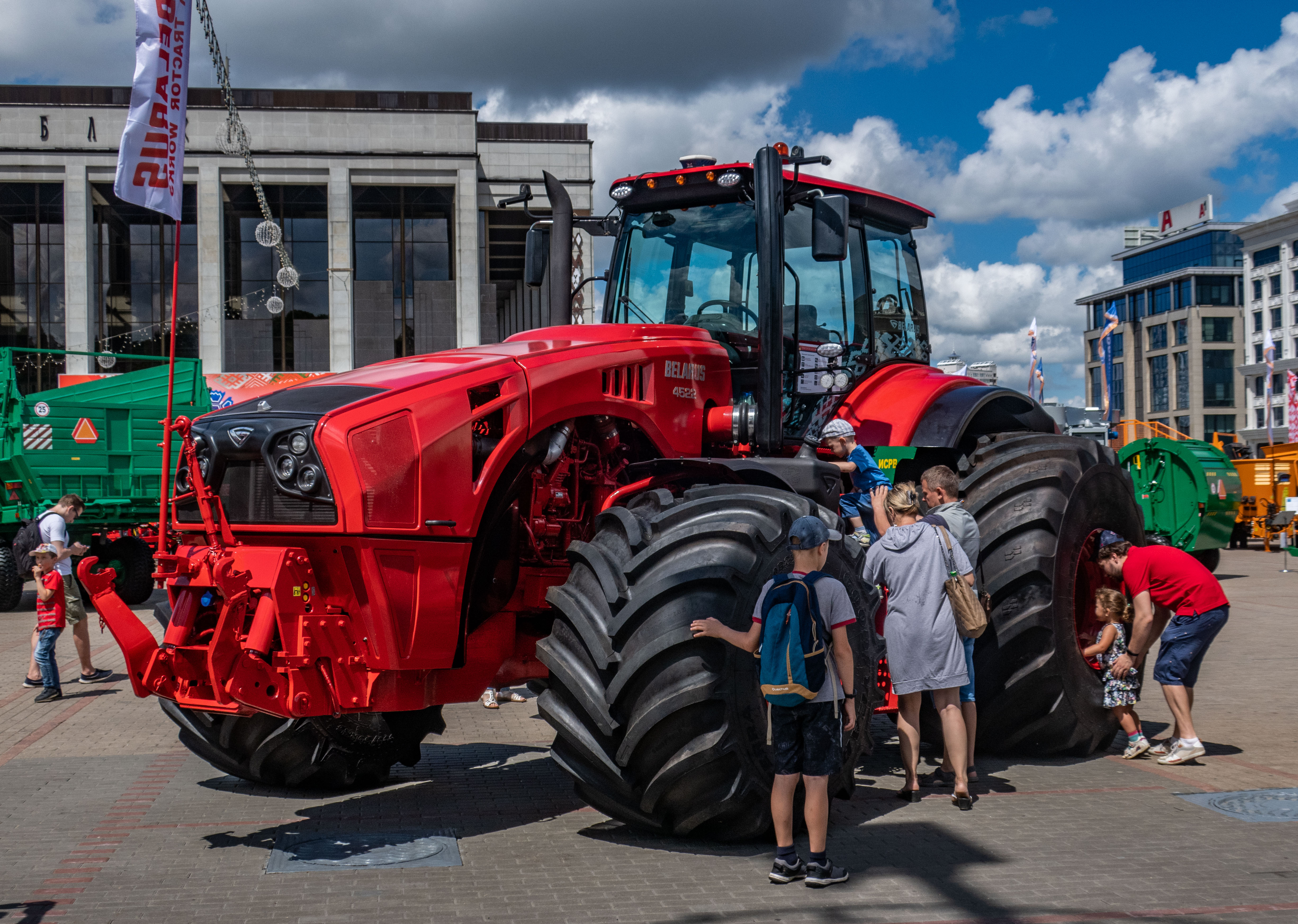
Two green trailers signaled by with the Unece SMV rear marking plate in the background, in Belarus

Regulation 69 applies to rear marking plates for vehicles of category M (transport of people), N (transport of good), O (transport of trailer) and T (tractors) and for mobile machinery, which, by construction, cannot move faster than 40 km/h.

The mark in the rear vehicle is a "SMV rear marking plate", a triangular plate with truncated corners with a characteristic pattern faced with retro-reflective and fluorescent material or devices (class 1); or with retro-reflective materials or devices only (class 2).

Regulation 69 enter into force on 15 May 1987 in Netherlands and Belgium. On 19 September 1987 in Denmark.

It applies in the United Kingdom since 27 April 1990.

It applies in Germany since 8 October 1993.

It applies in Russia since 8 April 1996.

It applies in the European Union since 24 March 1998, including in France and Italy.

In 2020, the regulation applies in the European Union, its 27 member countries and 19 other Unece countries, that is 46 countries.

==== National European laws ====
In Belgium, are classified as slow vehicles (véhicules lents) vehicle which cannot by design reach 40 km/h (25 mph).

Different signs are used in Europe:

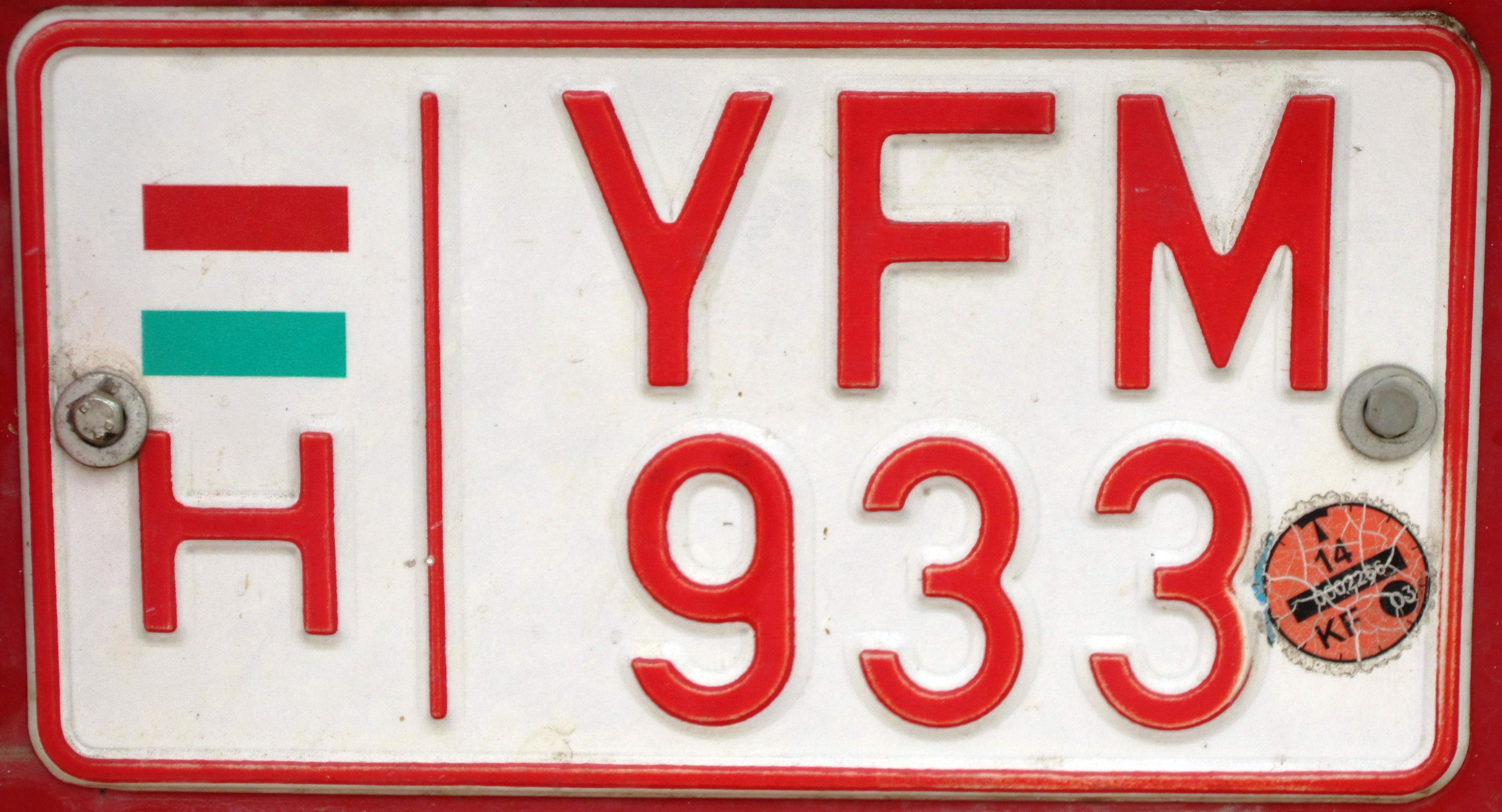
Hungary

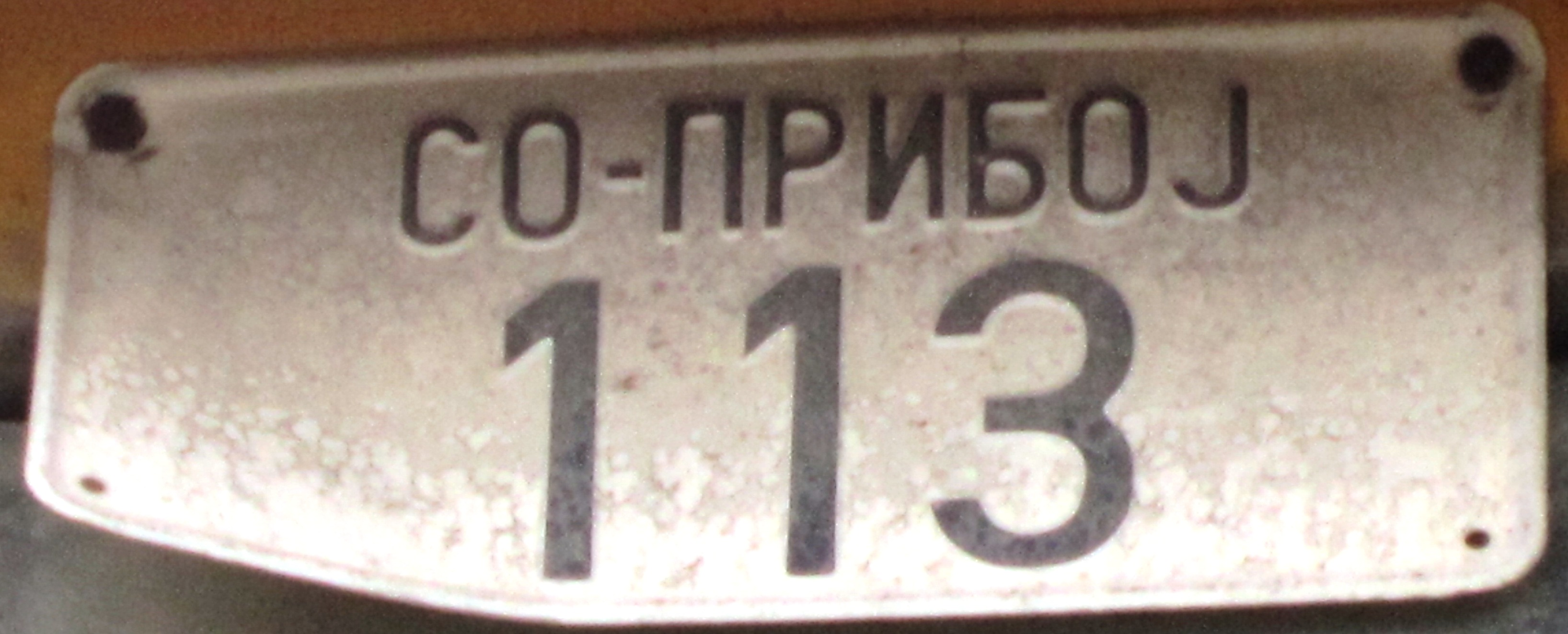
Serbia

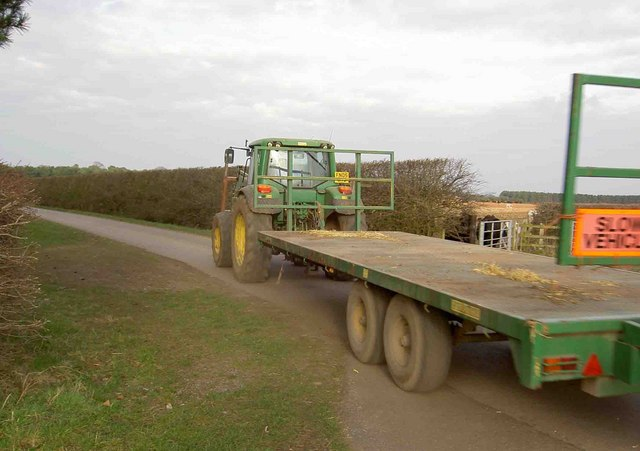
United Kingdom
