= Świna =

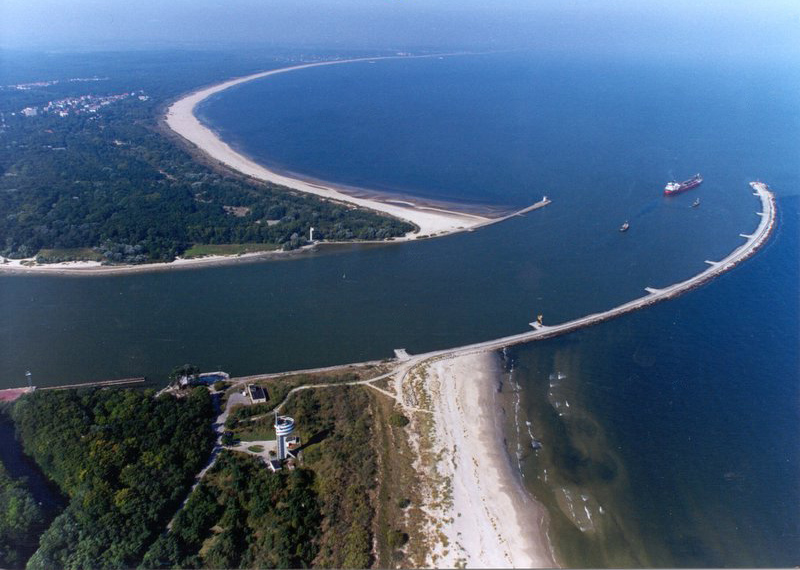
- Świna and the Baltic Sea

Location
- Country: Poland

Physical characteristics
- Source
  - location: Szczecin Lagoon
- Mouth
  - location: Baltic Sea
  - coordinates: 53°55′21″N 14°16′52″E
- Length: 16 km (9.9 mi)

The Świna (German: Swine; Pomeranian: Swina) is a channel in northwest Poland, between 2 and 4 km (1.2 and 2.5 miles) from the German border. It connects the Szczecin Lagoon with the Baltic Sea separating the islands of Uznam (German: Usedom) and Wolin. It is a part of the Oder estuary, and carries about 75% of that river's waterflow (of the remainder, Peenestrom carries 15% and Dziwna 10%). It has a length of about 16 km (9.9 miles). Świnoujście is a major town at the end of the channel towards the Baltic Sea.

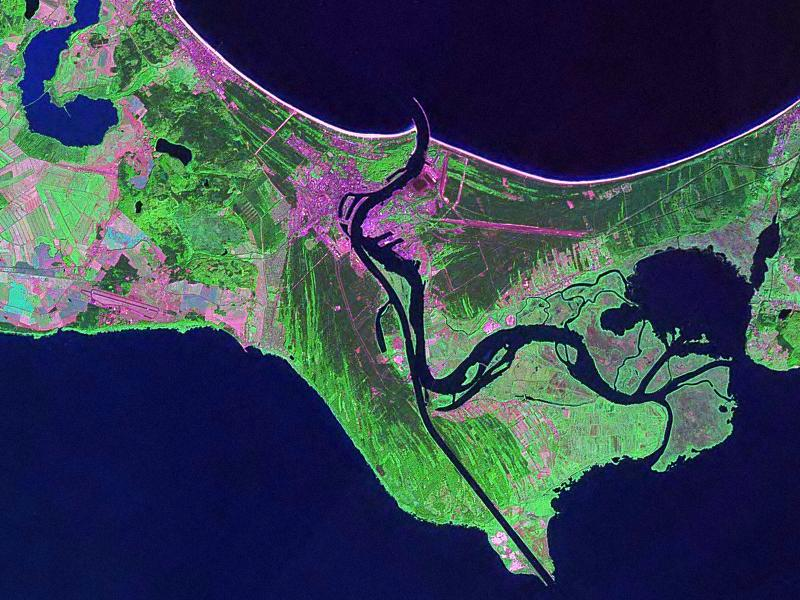
Landsat satellite photo showing Świna and the Piast canal to the west of it

The German Empire dammed and deepened the straits from 1874 to 1880 to create the Kaiserfahrt (Piast canal). It connects the northern part of the Świna directly with the Szczecin Lagoon and the Pomeranian harbor of Szczecin. The straits thus gained importance as a direct waterway to the industrial city. The territory along the straits' path was transferred from Germany to Poland following World War II.

== Regressive delta ==
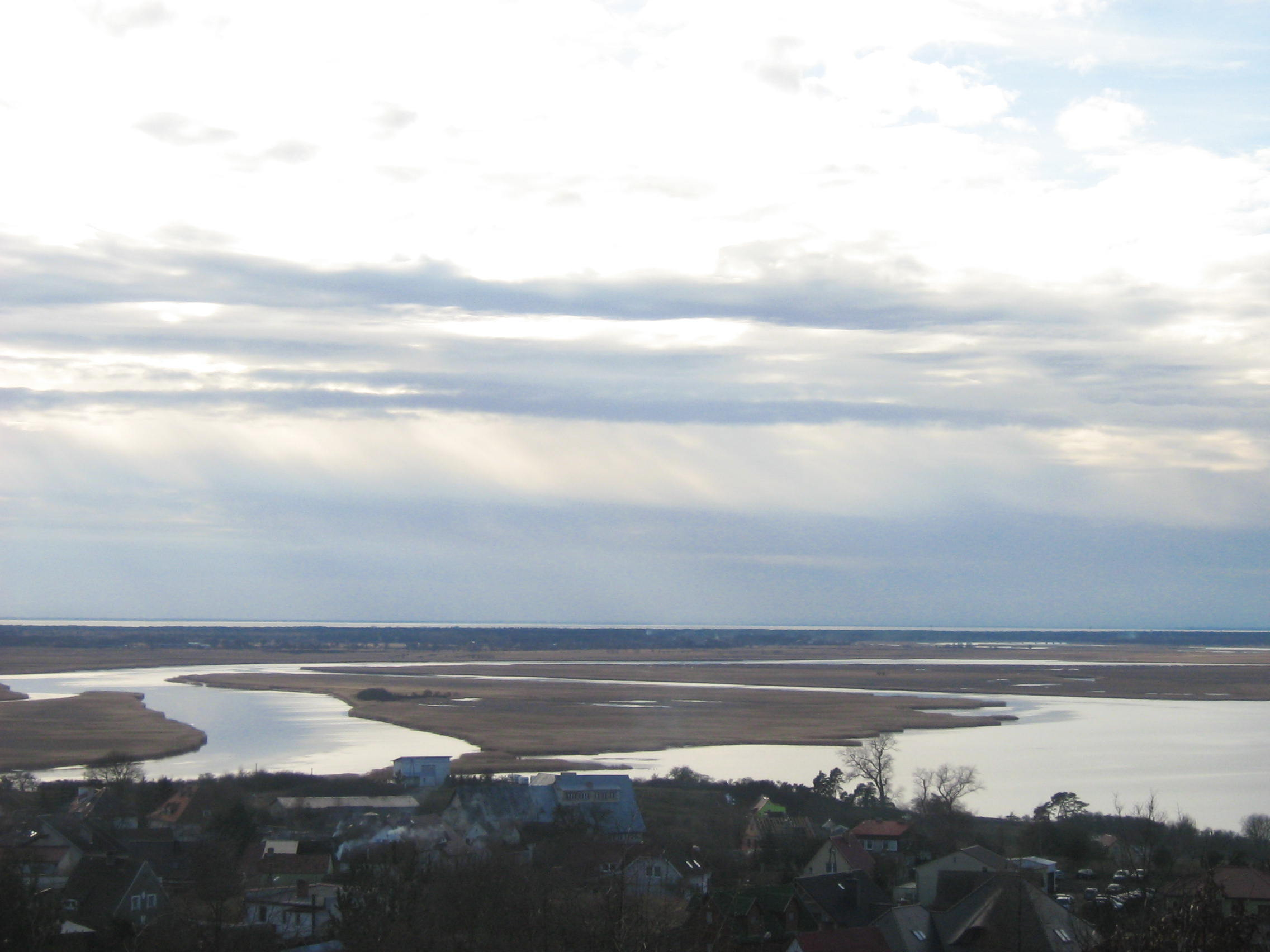

The regressive delta was formed by the floods of the Świna channel in the area of the Wolin National Park in 1996. This water-muddy natural complex forms an archipelago of 44 islands and canals with changing directions of water flow. The Delta Świna channel was formed by the Scandinavian glacier that withdrew from this territory 12,000 years ago. During the western and northern storms, sea water flowed into Szczecin Lagoon, overflowing the islands. The borders of islands are constantly shaped during the process of accumulation.

== See also ==
- Dziwna
- Peene
