= Böhmke =

Island in the Baltic Sea

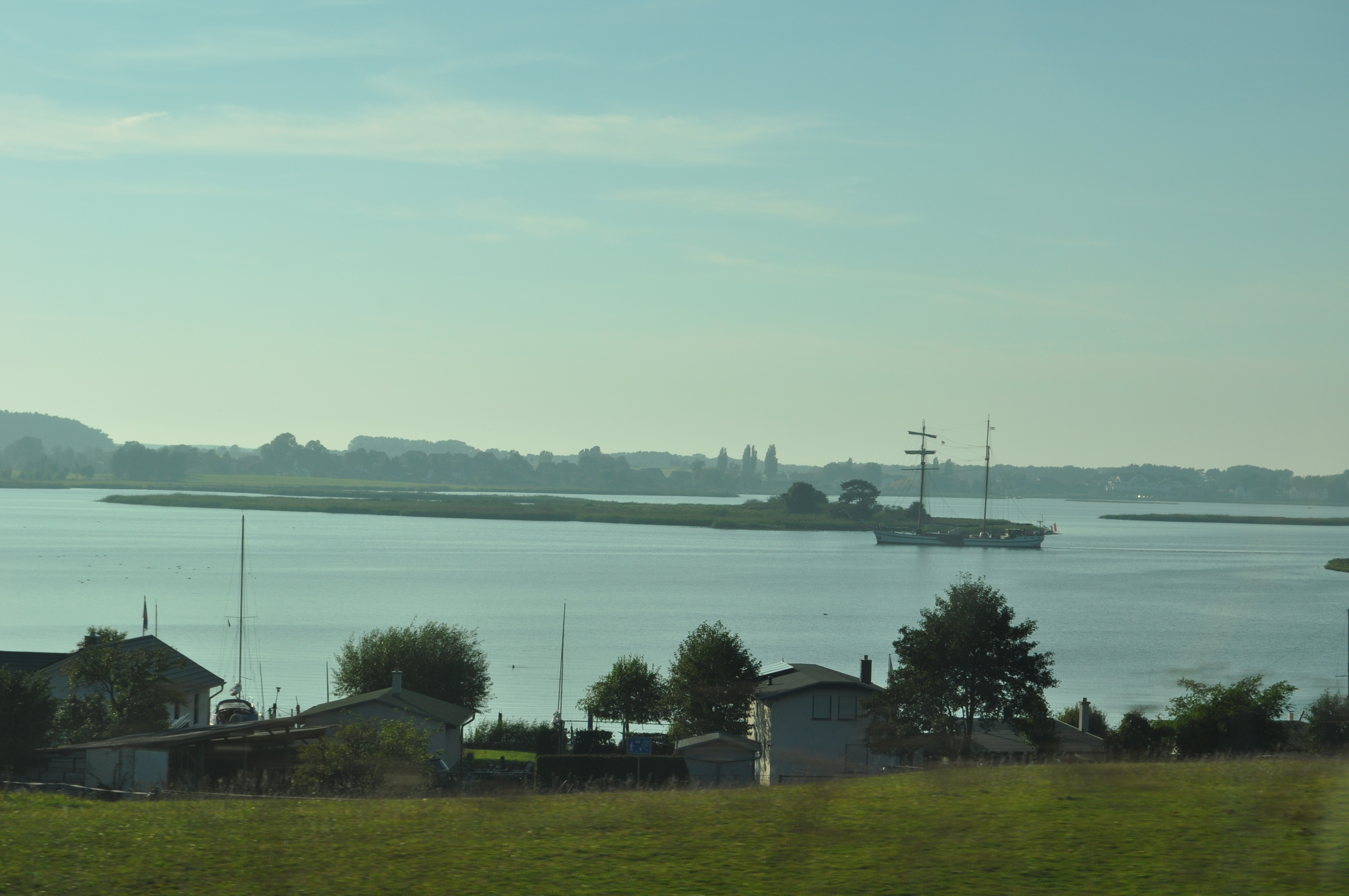
- Böhmke, from the east

Geography
- Location: Achterwasser
- Coordinates: 53°56′43″N 14°01′55.6″E
- Area: 0.032 km^{2} (0.012 sq mi)
- Length: 0.270 km (0.1678 mi)
- Width: 0.150 km (0.0932 mi)
- Highest elevation: 4.5 m (14.8 ft)

Administration
- DE-MV

Demographics
- Population: 0

Böhmke (German pronunciation: [ˈbøːmkə]) is a small, uninhabited island that lies between the lakes of Nepperminer See and Balmer See in the southeastern part of the Achterwasser, which separates the large Baltic Sea island Usedom from the mainland of Germany and Poland. The island belongs to the municipality of Benz in the county of Vorpommern-Greifswald, in the Germany state of Mecklenburg-Western Pomerania.

The island is approximately oval and has an area of 3.2 hectares. It extends for 270 metres from north to south and 150 metres from west to east. Its highest point lies in the north and is 4.5 metres above sea level (NN), where some bushes also grow. The southern half consists of marshy grassland.

Together with the neighbouring island of Balmer Werder, Böhmke lies in the Böhmke and Werder Islands Nature Reserve, which was established in 1967 in the Usedom Island Nature Park.
