= Schmollensee station =

German railway station

Schmollensee
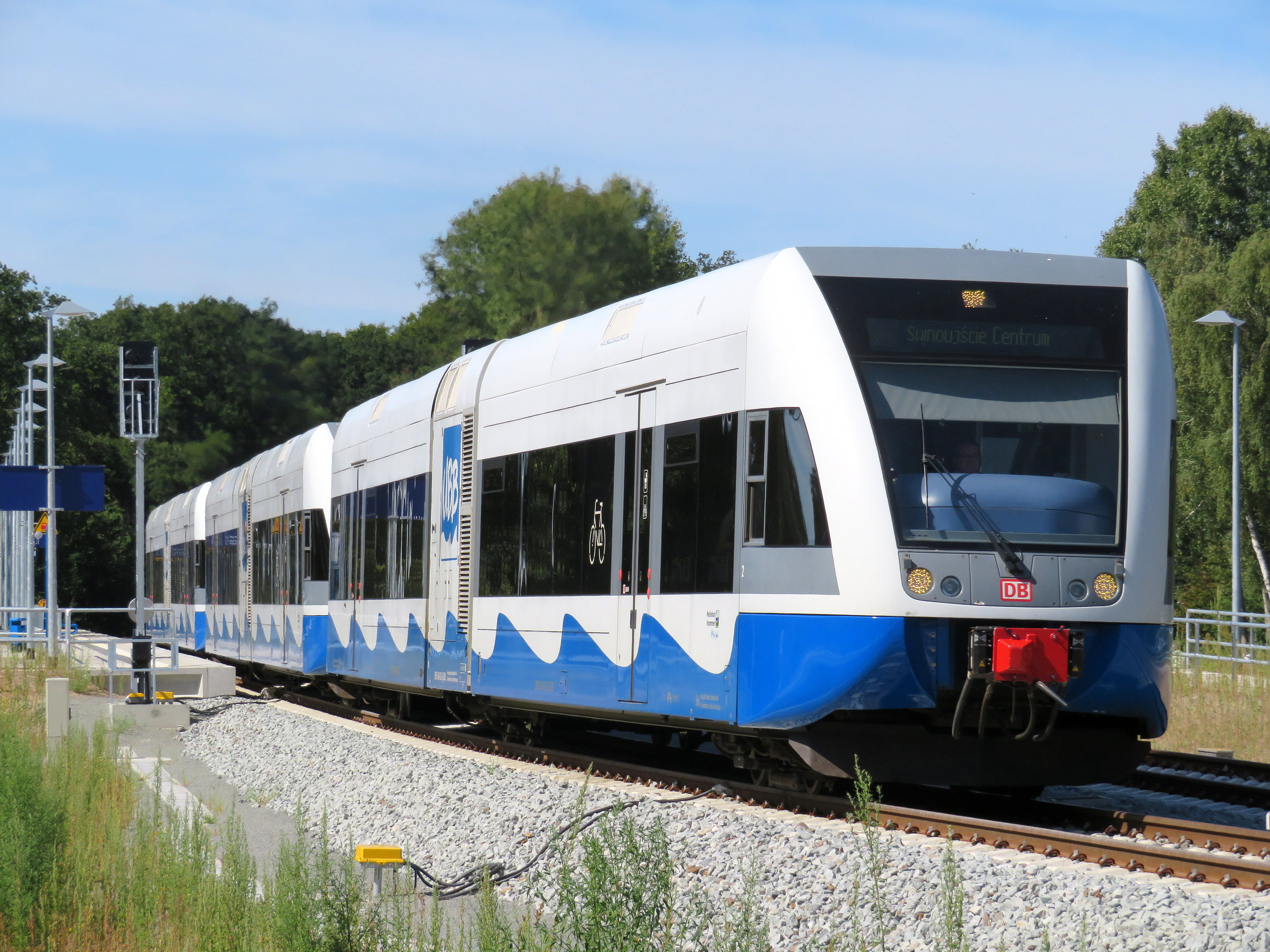
- 2018

General information
- Location: Bundesstraße 111/L266; 17429 Pudagla; Mecklenburg-Vorpommern; Germany
- System: Bf
- Owner: Usedomer Bäderbahn
- Operator: Usedomer Bäderbahn
- Lines: Ducherow–Heringsdorf–Wolgast Ferry railway (KBS 193)
- Platforms: 2 side platforms
- Tracks: 2
- Train operators: DB Regio Nordost

Other information
- Station code: -
- DS100 code: WSCM
- IBNR: 8012892
- Category: -

History
- Opened: 1943

Services
Preceding station	DB Regio Nordost	Following station
Neu Pudagla towards Züssow	RB 23	Bansin Seebad towards Świnoujście Centrum
Location
- Location within Mecklenburg-Vorpommern

Schmollensee station is a railway station in the municipality of Pudagla, located in the Vorpommern-Greifswald district in Mecklenburg-Vorpommern, Germany.

== Notable places nearby ==
- Schmollensee
