= Balmer See =

Bay in Germany

Coordinates: 53°56′59″N 14°1′16″E

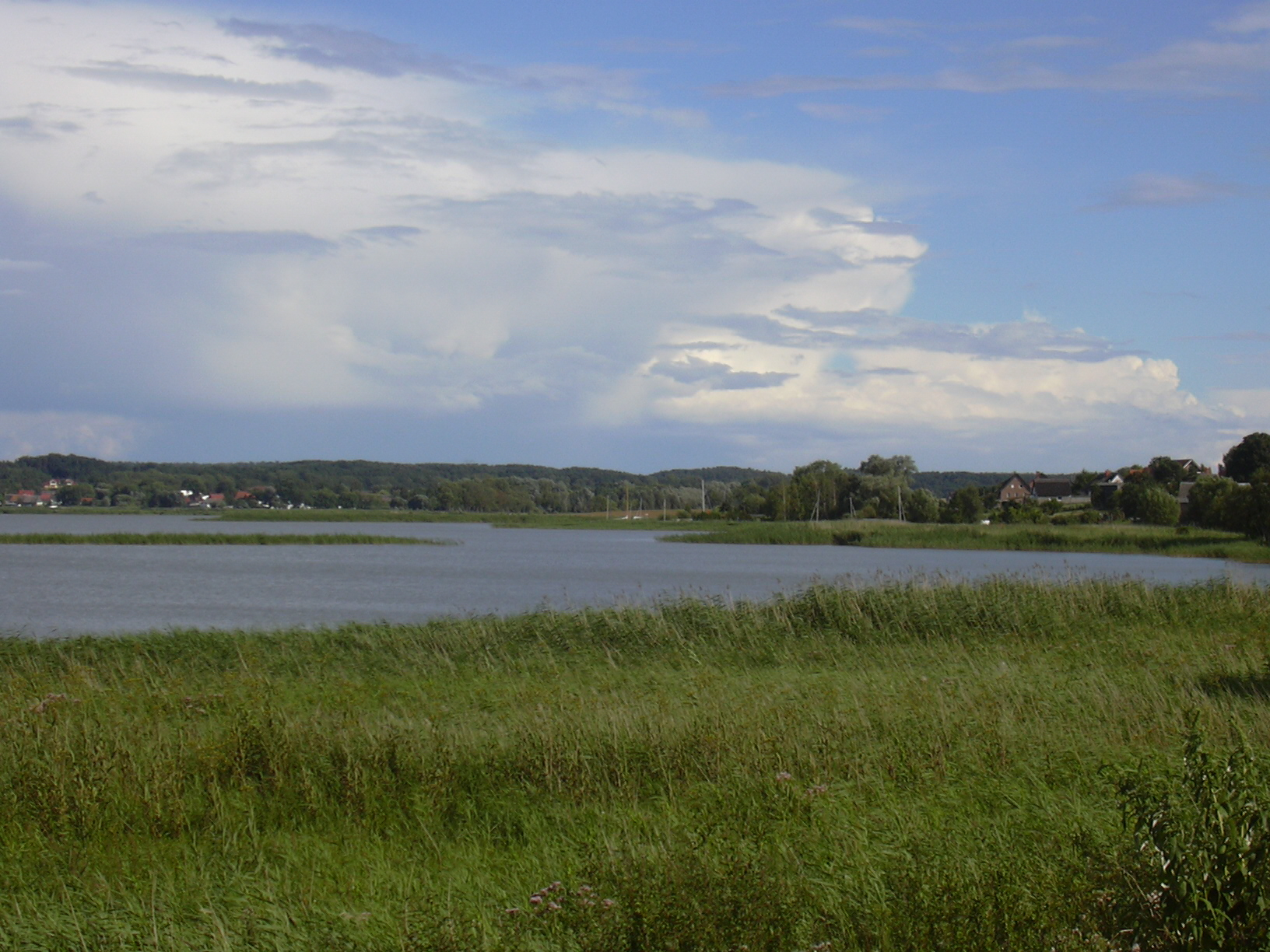
Reed landscape near Balm

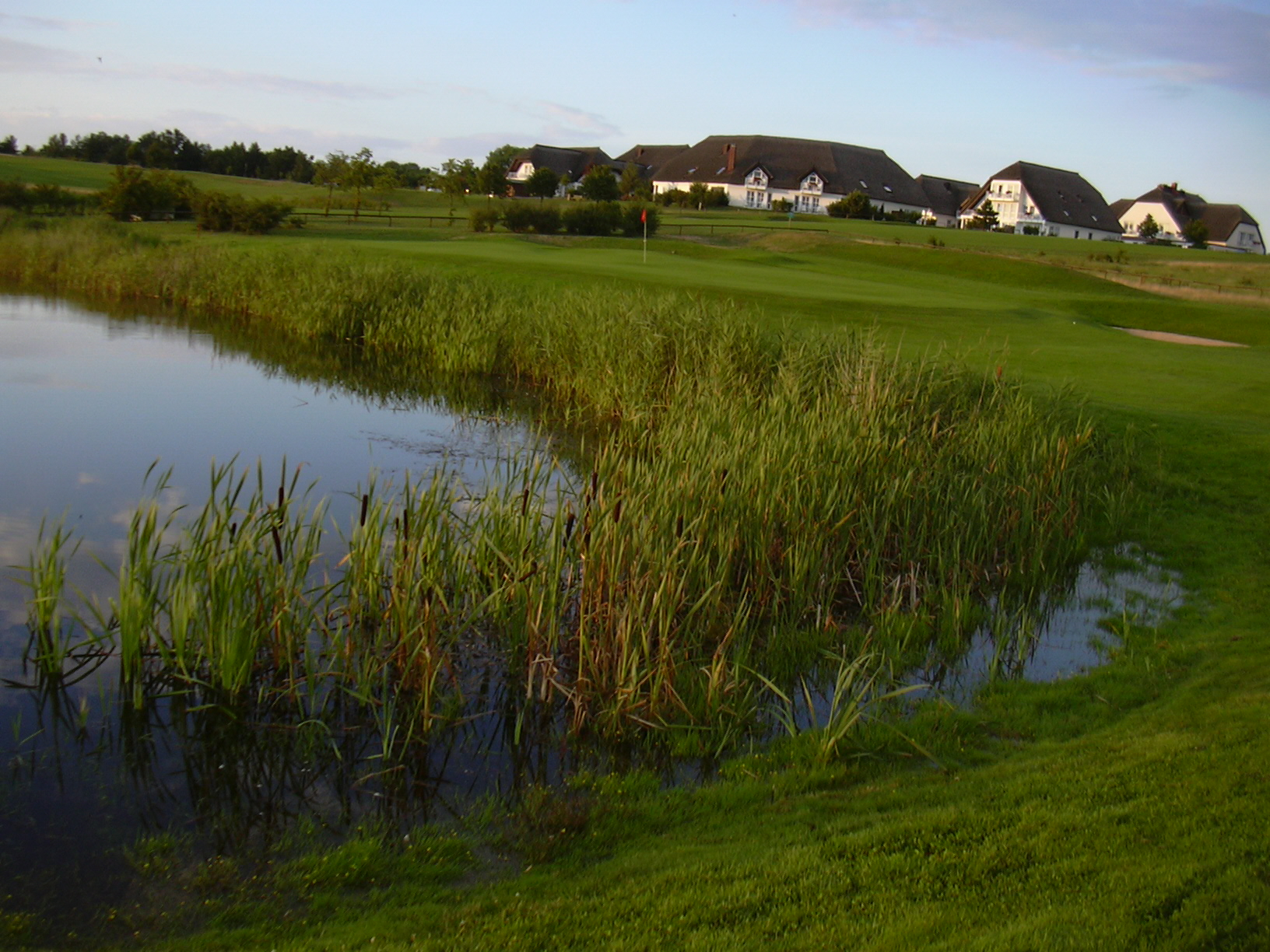
Balmer See Golf Club: 9th green with its water obstacle

The Balmer See is the southeastern embayment of the Achterwasser on the island of Usedom off Germany's Baltic coast. The northwestern tongue of land, Cosim, together with the two small islets of Böhmke and Werder are designated as a nature reserve and bird sanctuary. To the south is the only golf course on the island–with 27 holes and 120 hectares in area. To the east are the two small villages of Balm (c. 150 inhabitants) and Neppermin (350 inhabitants); the bay between Neppermin and the Schwedenschanze to the north is called Nepperminer See.

== History ==
Balm was first mentioned in 1236 under the Slavic name of Bialdab.

At that time it belonged, together with five other parished on Usedom (Ückeritz, Mellenthin, Loddin, Suckow and Krienke), to the estate of the bishops of Cammin. In a deed dated 15 March 1270 they exchanged these parishes, at the request of Duke Barnim I of Pomerania-Stettin, for Damerow in East Pomerania (near Naugard), that had belonged to the Premonstratensian abbey of Grobe near Usedom.

That apart, the history of the region is linked to that of Pomerania and Prussia. The area remained untouched by the historical tourism that had established itself in the Baltic Sea resorts in the 19th century. This was also true for the period from the Weimar Republic to the end of East Germany.

Not until after 1990 did the state of Mecklenburg-Vorpommern take steps to develop the infrastructure of the region. In 1998, the golf course was built together with surrounding hotel and apartment complex. It is intended to form part of an environmentally friendly tourist industry that is in harmony with the natural resources of the landscape.

== Nature conservation ==
Even in the days of East Germany, in 1967, the two small islets of Böhmke and Werder, an area of 118 hectares, were designated as a bird reserve. Around 1980 the numbers of black-headed gulls got out of hand: there were 14,000 of them, their droppings encouraged the rampant growth of stinging nettles and rarer, more sensitive species of bird had no chance. Only when numbers were brought under control and a small herd of Gotland sheep were introduced did the nature of the vegetation change; the numbers of black-headed gulls fell to about 8,000, common terns and black-tailed godwit returned. In addition, gadwall, tufted duck, pochard and mallard breed on the islands.

In 1996, the Cosim Peninsula Nature Reserve (85 ha) was established; in GDR times it had been used as pasture and peat bog. Footpaths through salt marshes, reed beds and alder woods cross the area today. With a little luck, the rarer species of bird may be seen on the reedy shores, that breed on both islands. These include the white stork and grey heron. In winter white-tailed eagles may also be seen, west of the nature reserve footpath to the old manor house of Dewichow (small holiday village) and the transition to the lake of Krienker See.
