= Groote Beek =

River in Germany

Groote Beek Große Beek
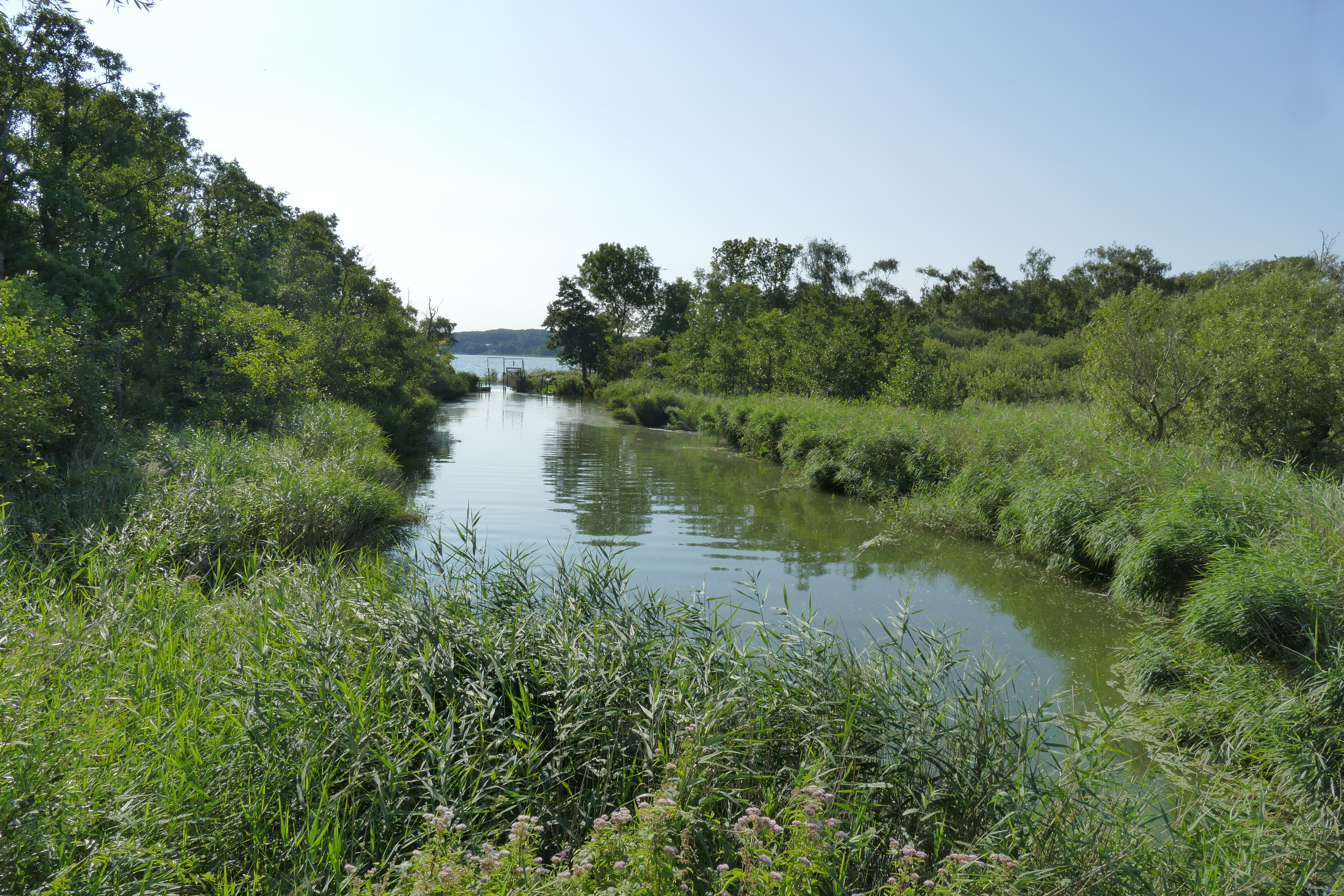

Location
- Country: Germany
- States: Mecklenburg-Vorpommern

Physical characteristics
- Source
  - location: Schmollensee lake
- Mouth
  - location: Achterwasser lagoon
  - coordinates: 53.9807°N 14.0486°E

Groote Beek (also: Große Beek) is a river on the island of Usedom, Mecklenburg-Vorpommern, Germany connecting the Schmollensee lake to the Achterwasser lagoon, which is connected to the Baltic Sea. The waterway begins at the Schmollensee to the east of the village Pudagla and runs approximately 2.1 kilometres in a north-westerly direction through wetlands to the Achterwasser.

== See also ==
- List of rivers of Mecklenburg-Vorpommern
