= Balmer Werder =

Island in Germany

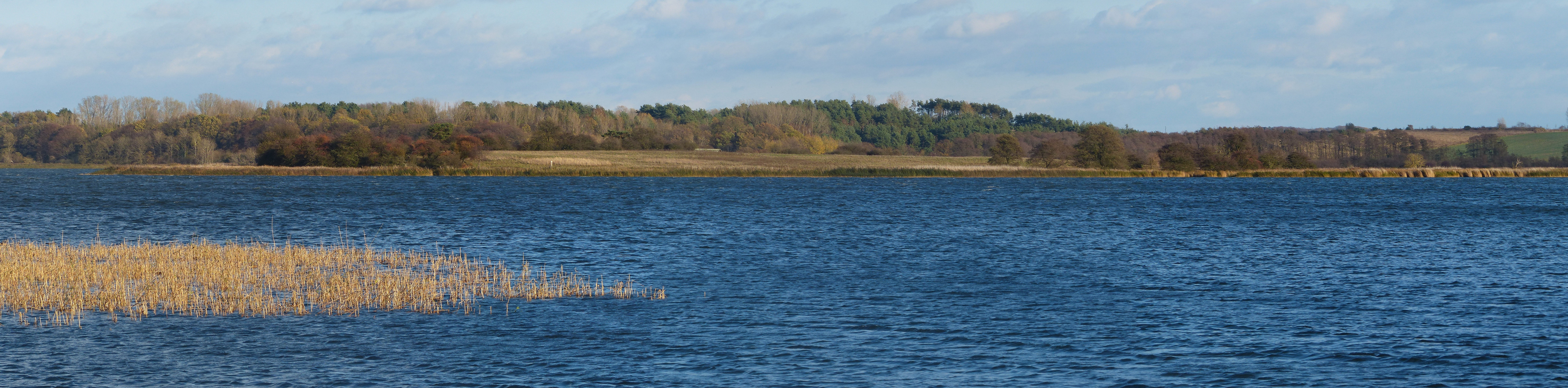
- The Balmer Werder seen from Balm

Geography
- Location: Baltic Sea
- Coordinates: 53°57′1″N 14°1′34″E
- Area: 6.3 ha (16 acres)
- Length: 0.5 km (0.31 mi)
- Width: 0.2 km (0.12 mi)
- Highest elevation: 5.9 m (19.4 ft)

Administration
- Germany

Demographics
- Population: 0

Balmer Werder is an uninhabited little island in the Baltic Sea, in the Balmer See, the southeastern part of the Achterwasser lagoon, between Usedom and the mainland off the village of Balm. Balm belongs to the municipality of Benz in the county of Vorpommern-Greifswald in the German state of Mecklenburg-Vorpommern.

The island is 6.3 hectares (16 acres) in area, 500 metres (1,600 ft) long from north to south and 200 metres (660 ft) wide at its widest point. Its maximum height above sea level (NN) is 5.9 metres (19 ft).

The Balmer Werder, along with the smaller island of Böhmke, lies within a nature reserve, established in 1967, in Usedom Island Nature Park.
