= Cämmerer See =

Lake in Usedom, Mecklenburg-Vorpommern, Germany

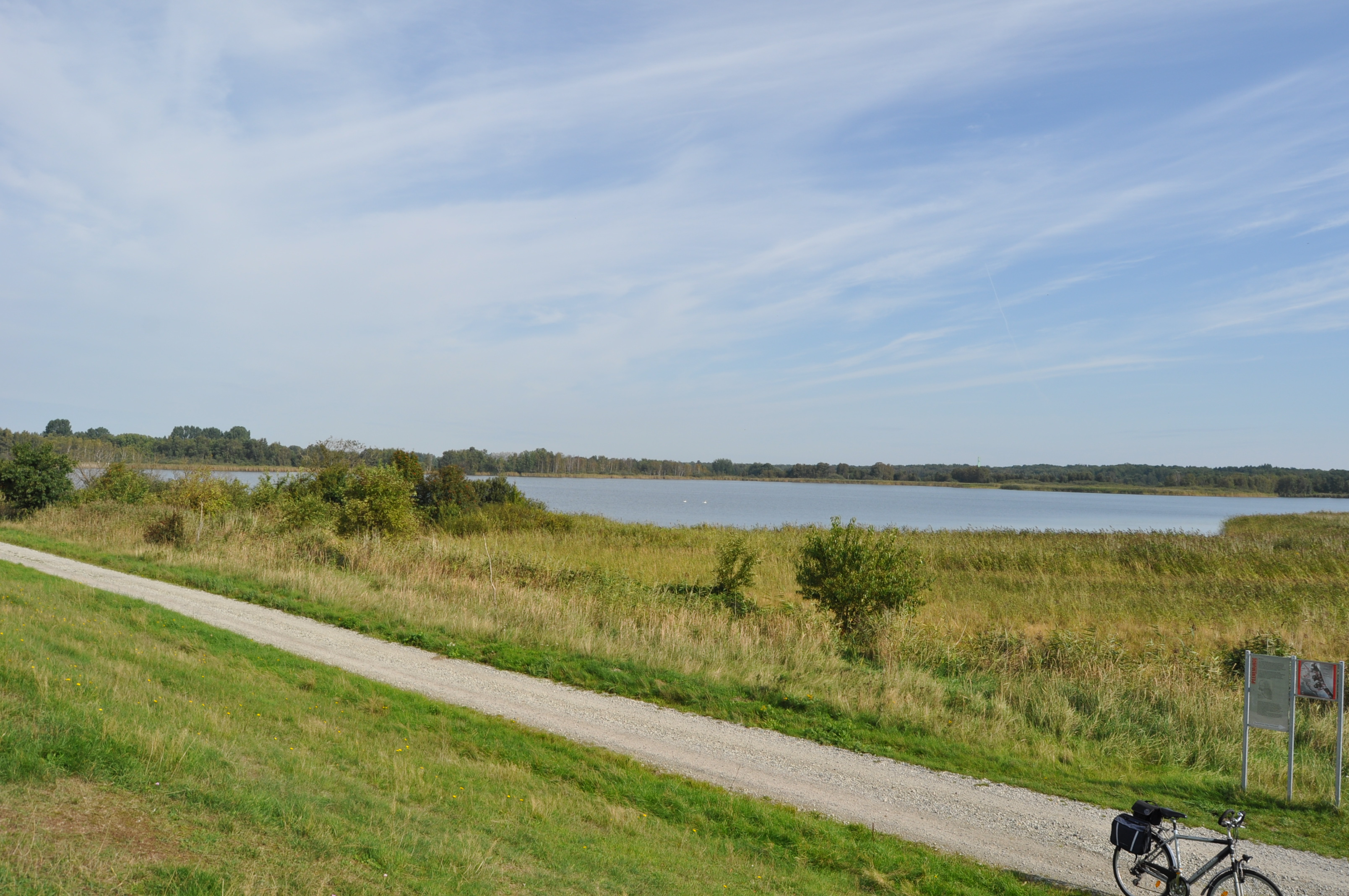

- Location within Mecklenburg-Vorpommern
- Location: Usedom, Mecklenburg-Vorpommern, Germany
- Coordinates: 54°7′51″N 13°46′48″E
- Basin countries: Germany
- Surface area: 0.18 km^{2} (0.069 sq mi)
- Average depth: 1.1 m (3 ft 7 in)
- Max. depth: 3.5 m (11 ft)
- Surface elevation: 0.3 m (1 ft 0 in)

Cämmerer See is a lake in Usedom, Mecklenburg-Vorpommern, Germany. Its elevation is 0.3 m (1 ft 0 in) and its surface area is 0.18 km^{2} (0.069 sq mi).
