= Wolgastsee =

Lake in Mecklenburg-Vorpommern, Germany

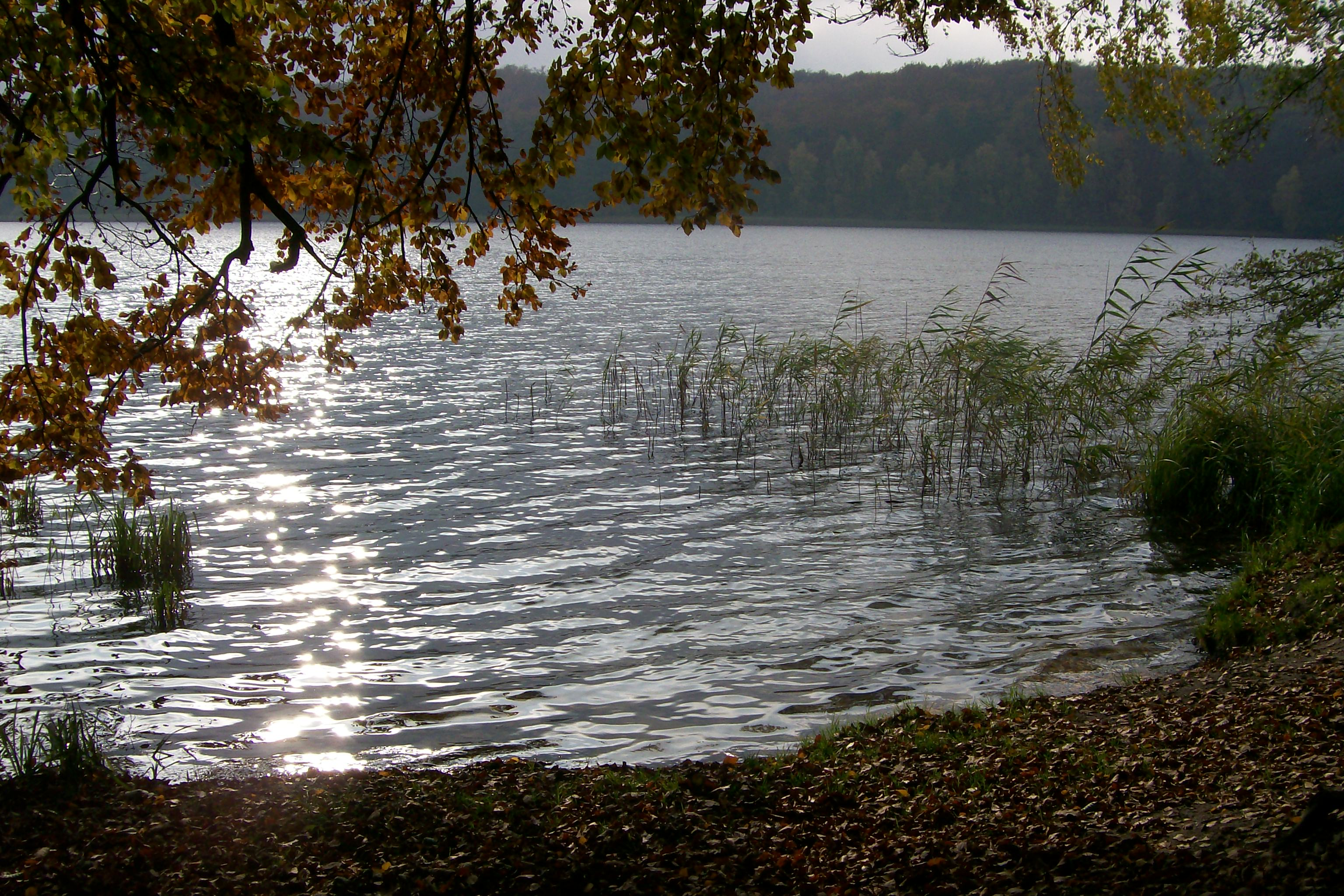

- Location within Mecklenburg-Vorpommern
- Location: Usedom, Mecklenburg-Vorpommern
- Coordinates: 53°55′1″N 14°10′36″E
- Basin countries: Germany
- Surface area: 47 ha (120 acres)
- Average depth: 4.1 m (13 ft)
- Max. depth: 7.5 m (25 ft)
- Surface elevation: −0.6 m (−2.0 ft)

Wolgastsee is a lake in Usedom, Mecklenburg-Vorpommern, Germany. At an elevation of -0.6 m, its surface area is 0.47 km^{2}.
