= Kamminke =

- Municipality
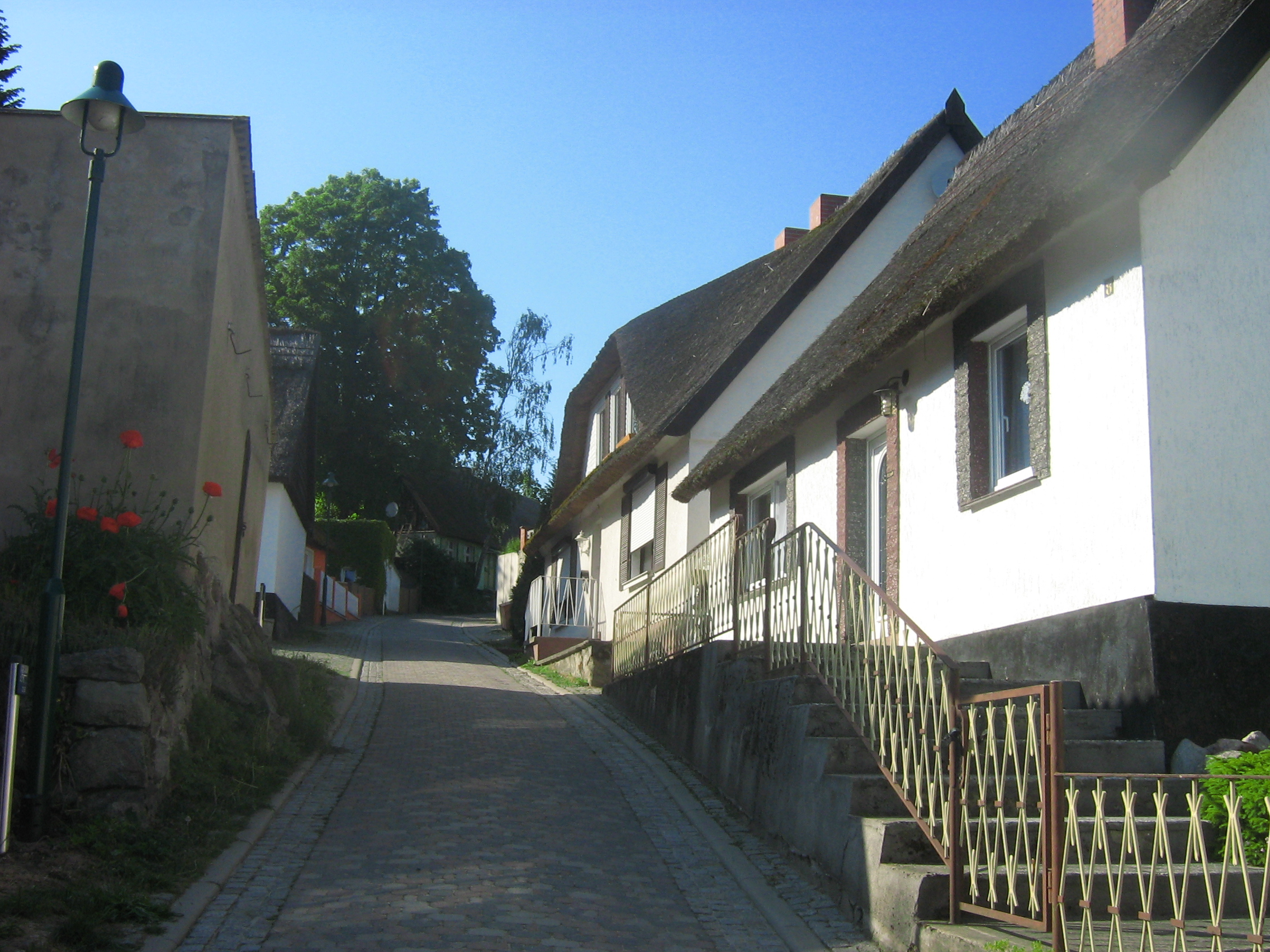
- Thatched roofs in Kamminke

- Location of Kamminke within Vorpommern-Greifswald district
- Interactive map of Kamminke
- Location within Germany Location within Mecklenburg-Vorpommern
- Coordinates: 53°52′N 14°12′E
- Country: Germany
- State: Mecklenburg-Vorpommern
- District: Vorpommern-Greifswald
- Municipal assoc.: Usedom-Süd

Government
  - Mayor: Uwe Hartmann

Area
  - Total: 2.96 km^{2} (1.14 sq mi)
- Elevation: 2 m (6.6 ft)

Population (2025-12-31)
  - Total: 234
  - Density: 79.1/km^{2} (205/sq mi)
- Time zone: UTC+01:00 (CET)
  - Summer (DST): UTC+02:00 (CEST)
- Postal codes: 17419
- Dialling codes: 038376
- Vehicle registration: VG

Kamminke (German pronunciation: [kaˈmɪŋkə]) is a municipality in the Vorpommern-Greifswald district, in Mecklenburg-Vorpommern, Germany, on the German-Polish border.

== See also ==
- Golm War Cemetery
