= Golm War Cemetery =

Cemetery in Kamminke, Germany

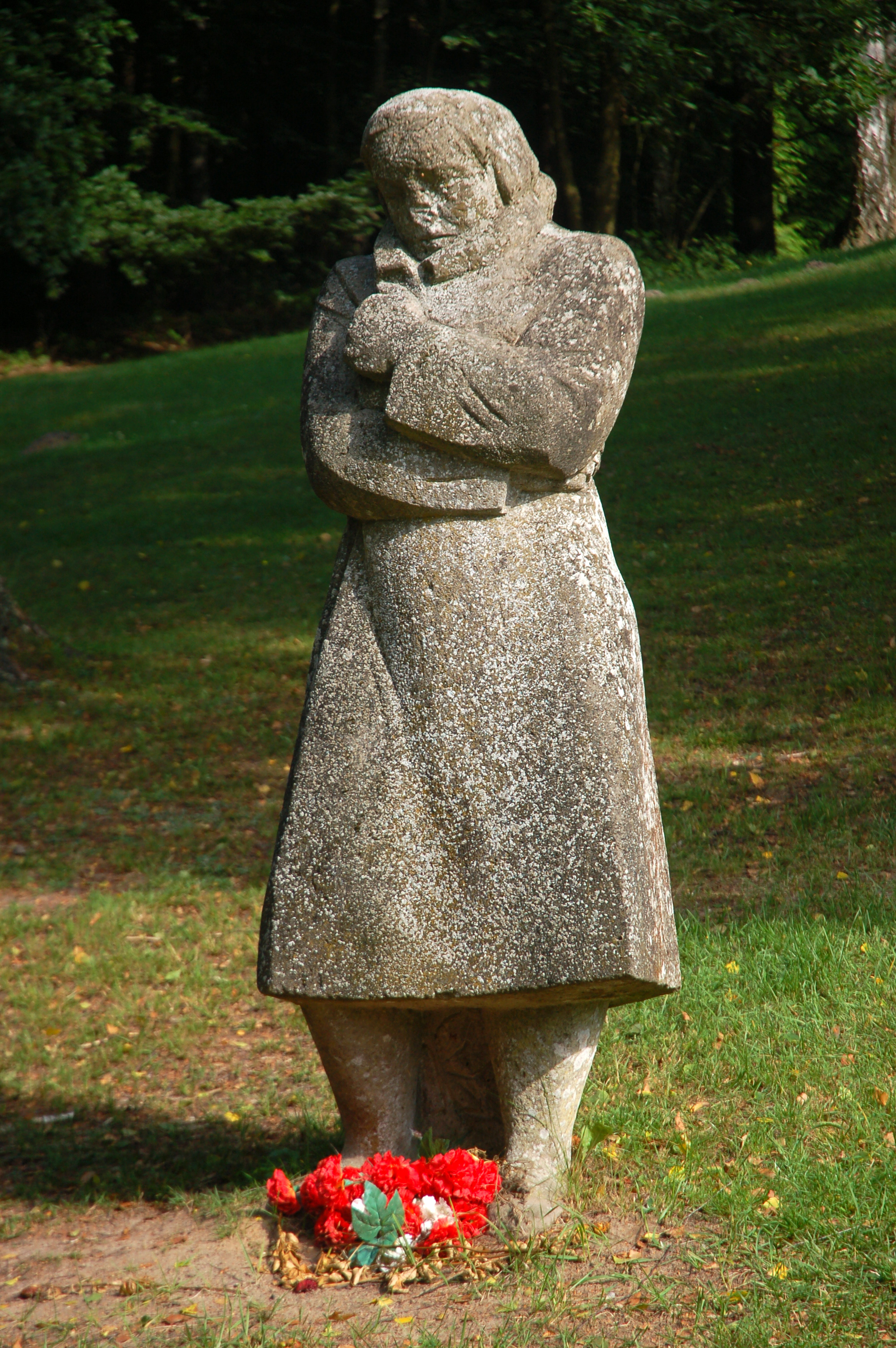
- Interactive map of Golm War Cemetery

Details
- Established: 1943
- Location: Kamminke
- Country: Germany
- Coordinates: 53°53′N 14°12′E
- Type: Public
- No. of graves: 24,322
- Website: www.jbs-golm.de

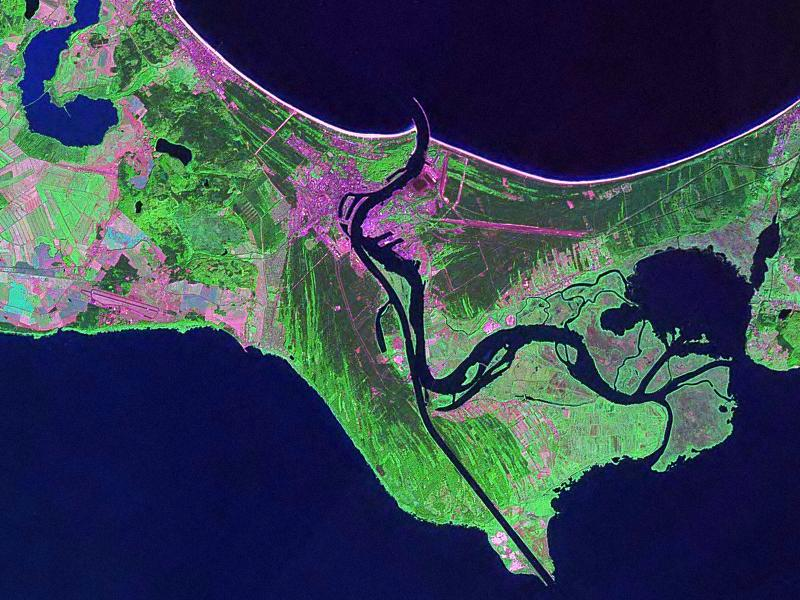
Świnoujście and the Golm area

The Golm War Cemetery (German: Kriegsgräberstätte Golm) is a World War II cemetery near the village of Kamminke close to the German-Polish border on the island of Usedom maintained and managed by the German War Graves Commission. The cemetery is the largest war cemetery in Mecklenburg-Vorpommern and one of the largest in Germany.

== History ==
The Golm is the highest lying land on the island of Usedom (69 m) and was a popular tourist destination prior to World War II. The cemetery was created in 1944, initially for soldiers of the nearby garrisons of Swinemünde (Świnoujście) and the Garz air base. About 250 members of Nazi Germany's Kriegsmarine, the crew of a sunken U-boat and at least 1,000 Wehrmacht and Luftwaffe soldiers are buried here.

=== Air Raid ===
In early 1945, Swinemünde was the destination port for refugees from East Prussia under Operation Hannibal. On the eastern shore of the Swine river (Świna) refugees from Farther Pomerania waited for a chance to ferry across the watercourse as they fled the advancing Red Army.

At around noon on 12 March 1945, 671 bombers of the US Eighth Air Force carrying 1,456 tons of bombs raided the town. Due to uncertainty concerning the number of refugees within the town the exact number of casualties is unknown. As the capacity of air raid shelters was limited to the regular populace, many refugees were killed at the spa gardens. The motor vessel Andros (2,995 GRT), carrying about 2,000 refugees, had just arrived at the harbour and was sunk with the loss of about 570 people. The motor vessels Cordillera (12,055 GRT), Tolina (2,000 GRT), Heiligenhafen (1,923 GRT), Ravensberg (1,069 GRT) Hilde (491 GRT) and Jasmund (276 GRT) were also sunk.

About 500 victims of the raid were identified and buried close to the entrance of the cemetery and the remaining dead were buried in mass graves. The estimated number of victims varies from about 5,000 to 23,000. Recent research places the number at around 10,000.

=== Postwar ===
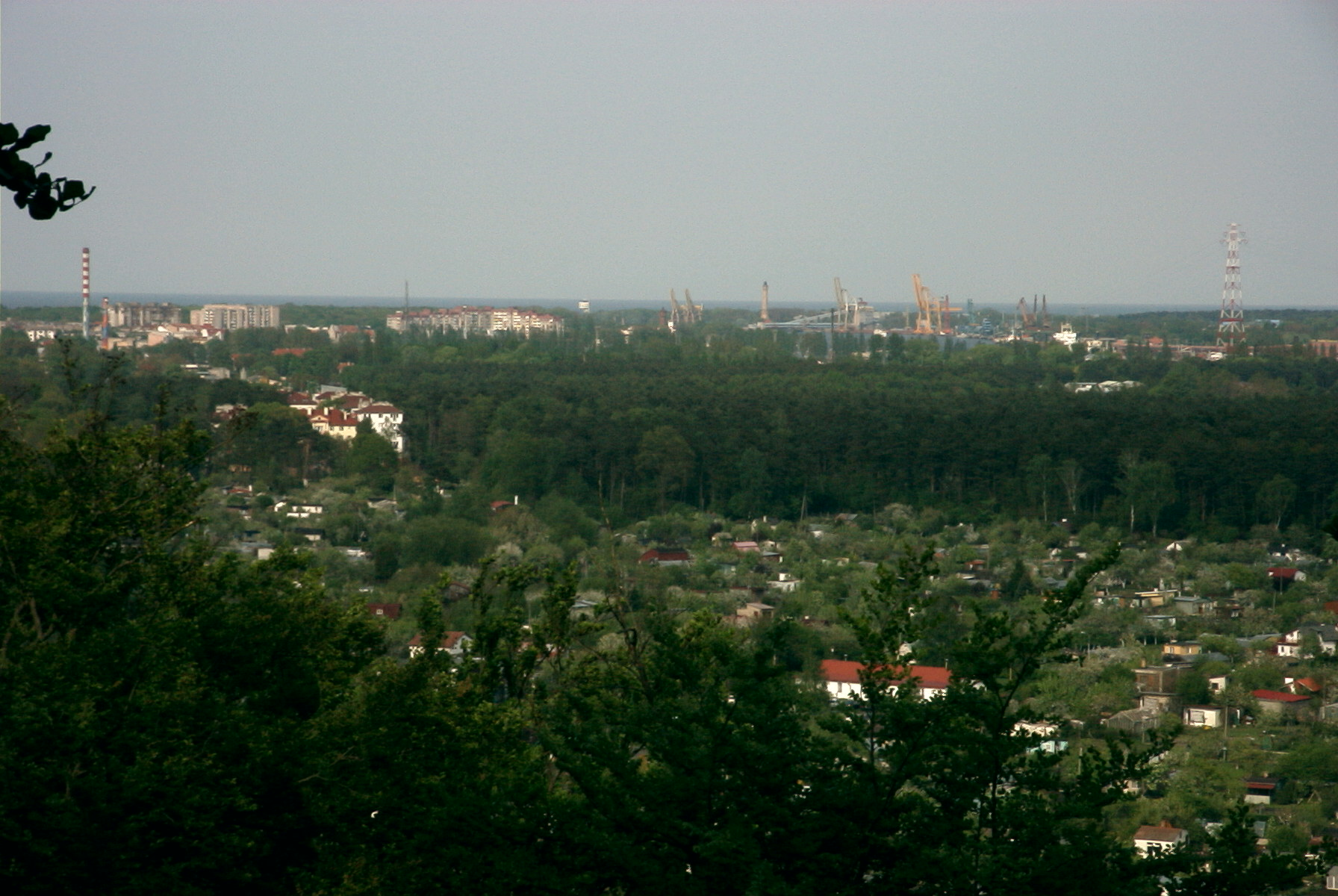
View from Mt. Golm towards Swinemünde

Golm lay directly on the newly created Oder-Neisse line that marked the new border between Germany and Poland. Following the war, most refugees continued to flee to the west and the local German populace was forcibly expelled. The cemetery attracted only slight attention, and the area had almost turned into a forest again. In the 1950s, the Pomeranian Evangelical Church began caring for the site. However, a large wooden cross placed there in 1954 was immediately destroyed, and East German authorities forbade the erection of Robert Leptien's sculpture "Freezing Woman" (1952) because it did not match the artistic perceptions of the communist party line. In the late 1960s, the local administration rearranged the cemetery and removed any Christian symbols and individual headstones. An official memorial site was established in 1975, the main memorial bears the inscription That never again a mother mourns her son., a line from the East German national anthem Auferstanden aus Ruinen by Johannes R. Becher.

While Leptien had moved to West Berlin his sculpture remained at his former garden and was finally erected at the cemetery without an official permission in 1984.

After the Reunification of Germany the German War Graves Commission took over the care of the cemetery and opened an International Youth Meeting Center in 2005 with the purpose of strengthening and cultivating democracy in Europe.

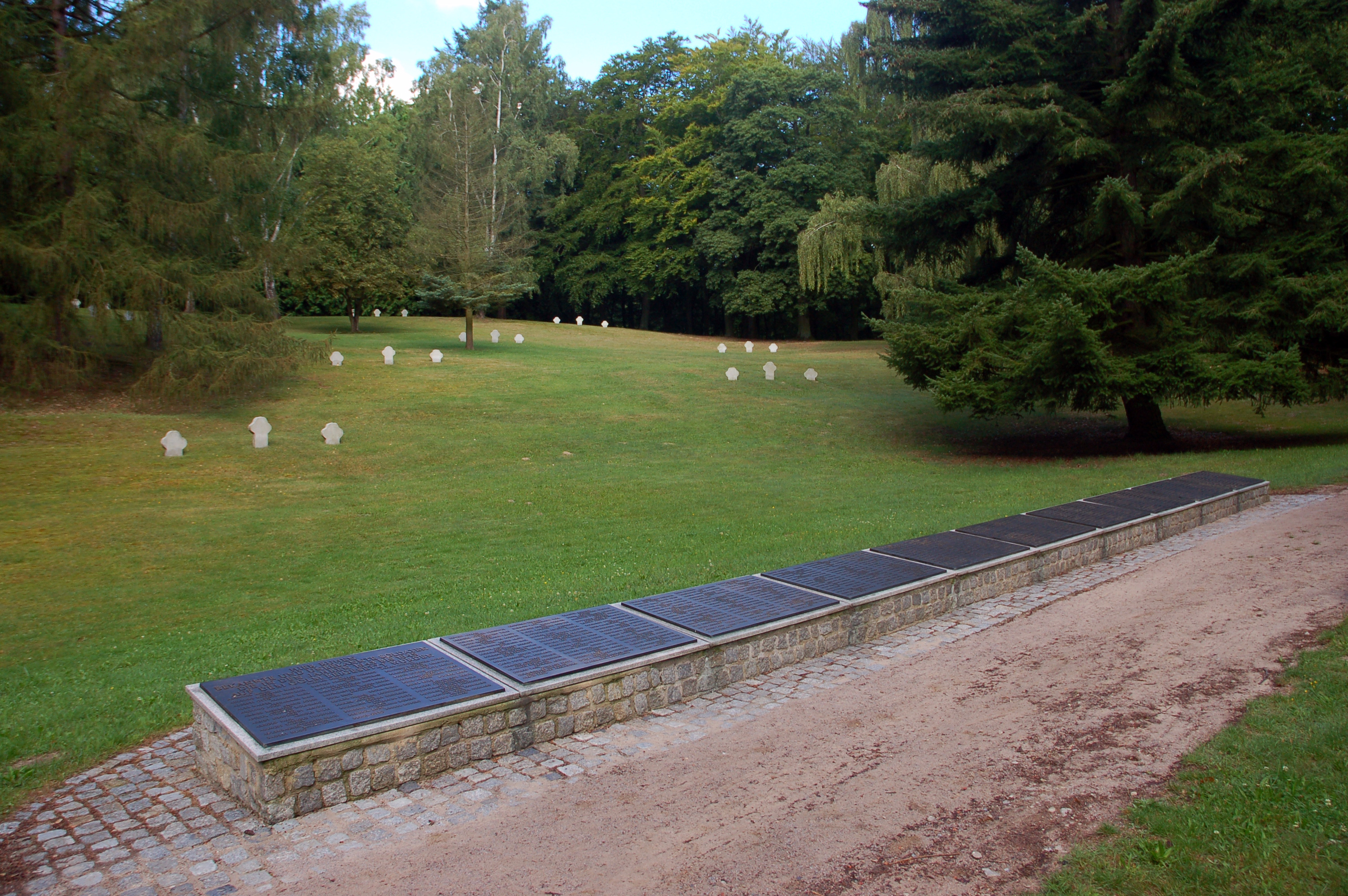

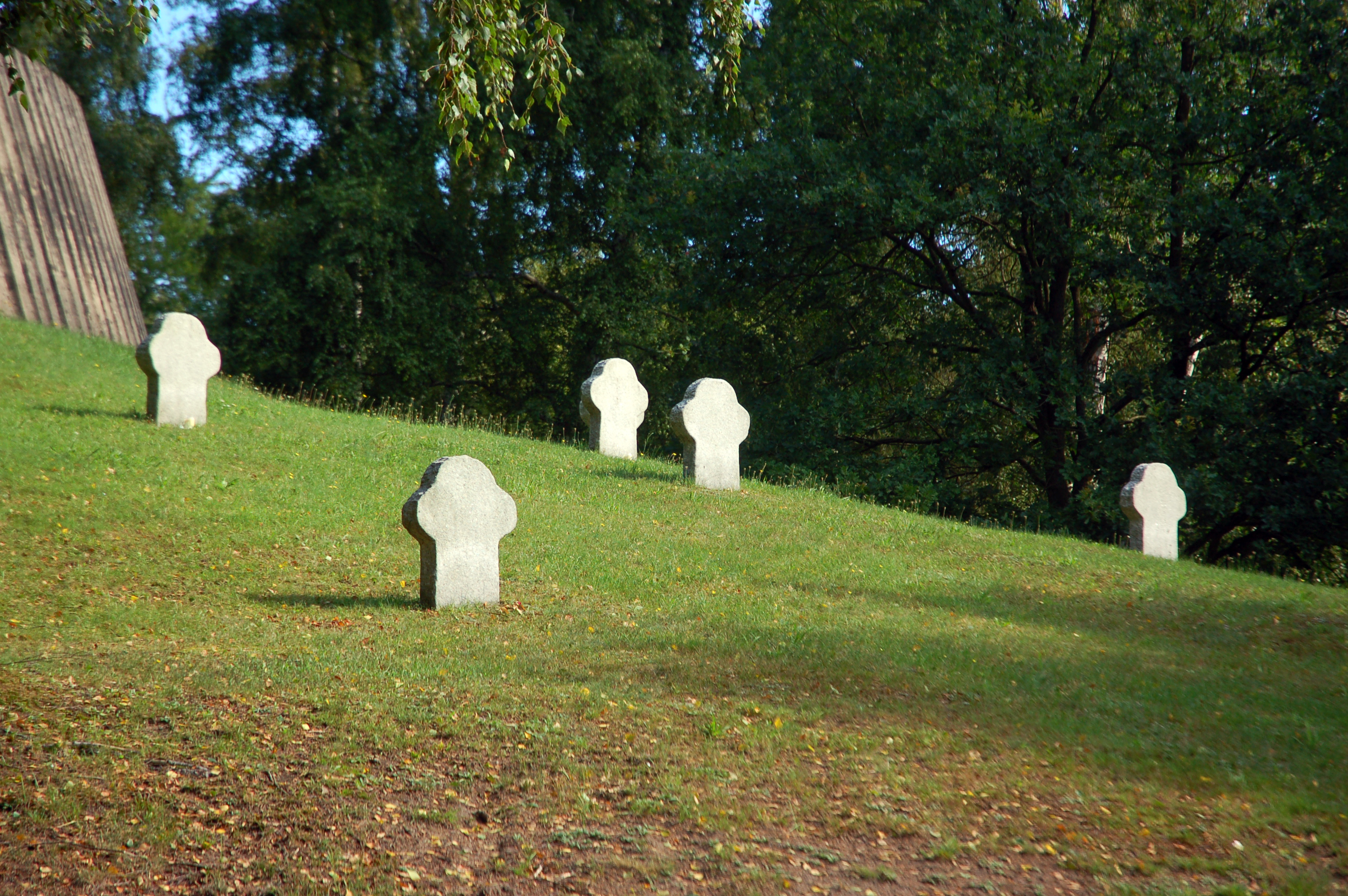

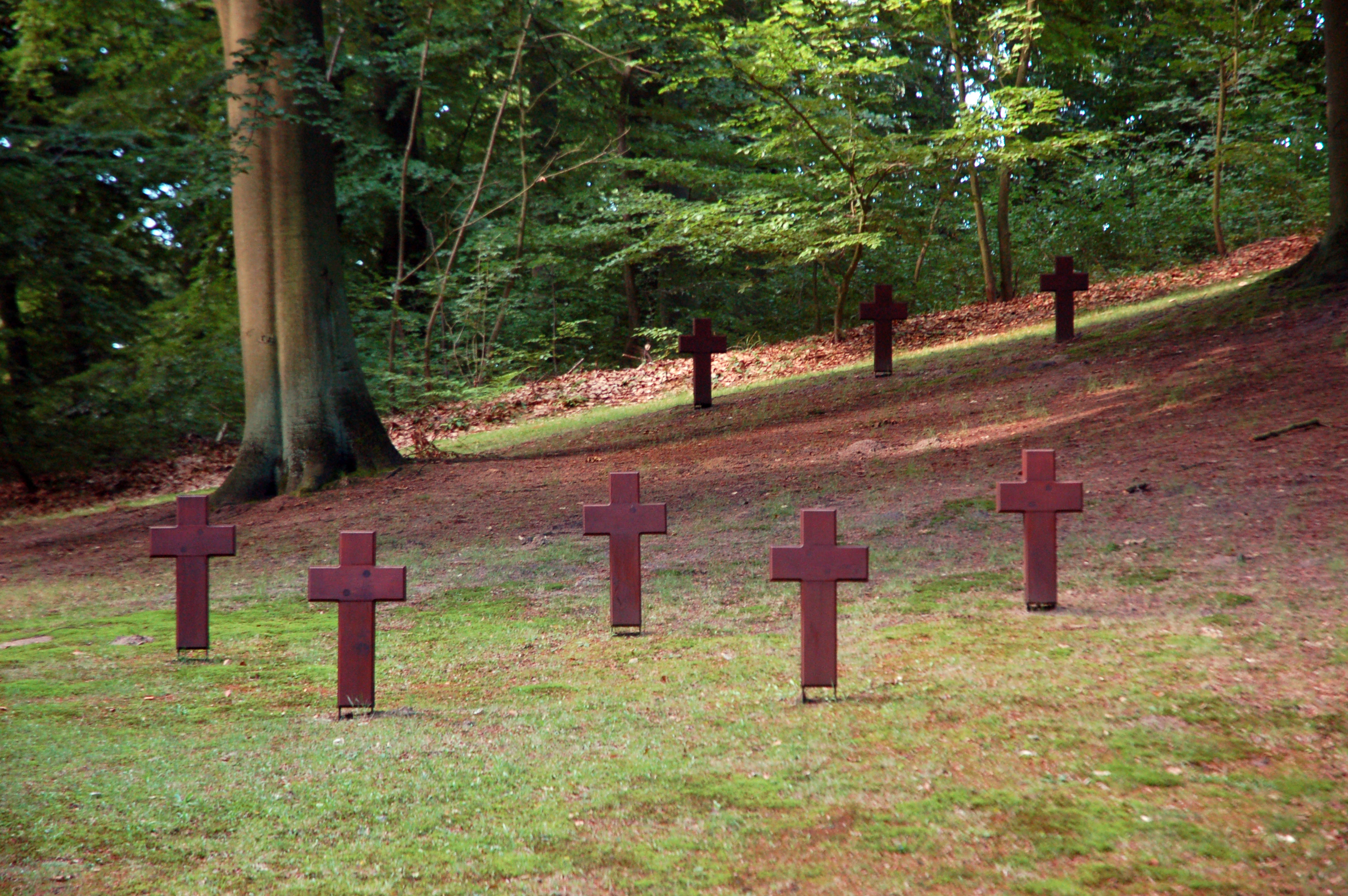

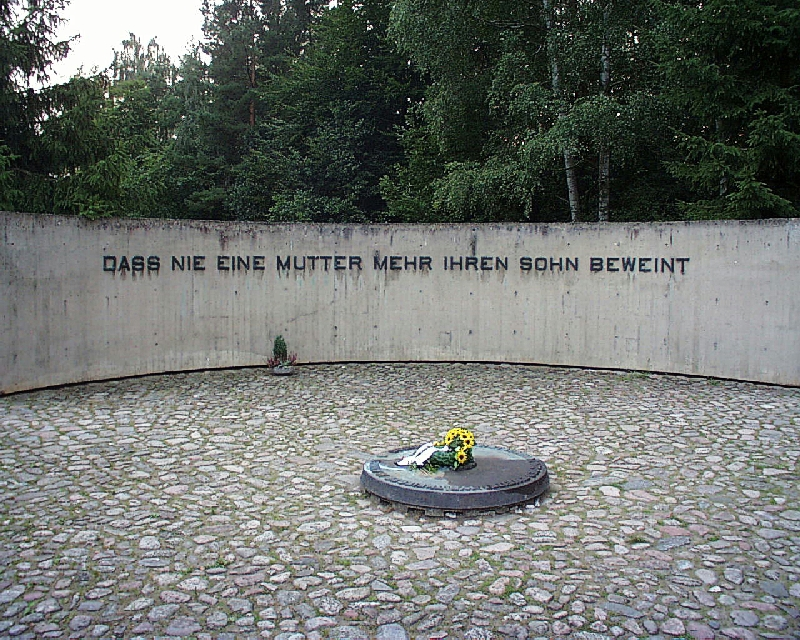
