= Dannenfeldt Mausoleum =

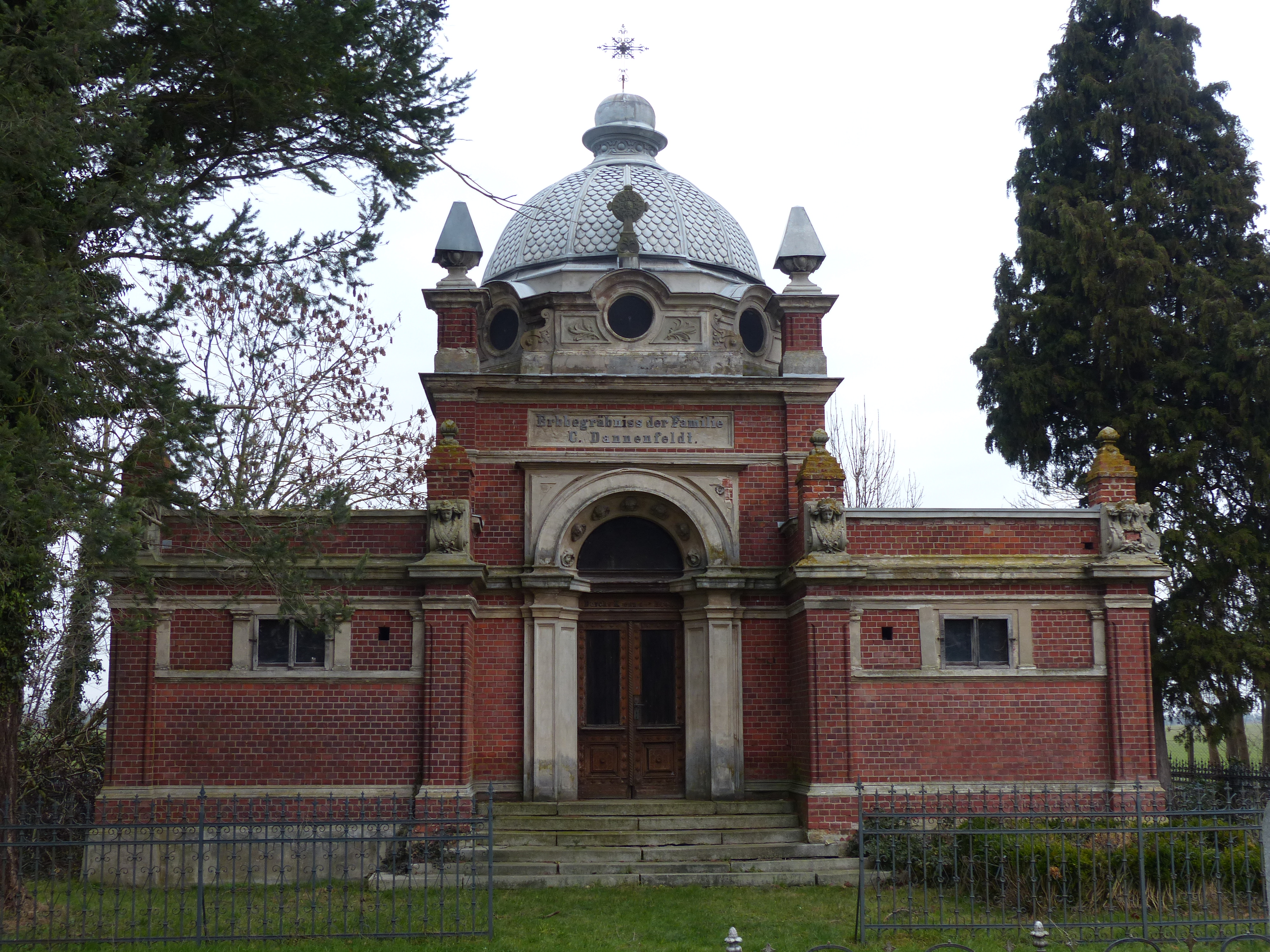
- Interactive map of Dannenfeldt Mausoleum
- 53°50′38.55″N 13°14′14.95″E
- Type: Mausoleum
- Associated with: Dannenfeldt family members
- Location: Mönchow, Usedom, Germany
- Part of: Mönchow village church grounds

History
- Built: 1891
- Built by: Pistorius

Site notes
- Public access: Unrestricted on grounds

The Dannenfeldt Mausoleum is a historical building and tourist attraction across the road from the 15th-century late Gothic village church in Mönchow, Usedom, Germany.

The small cemetery that accompanies the Mönchow church is the final resting place of the Dannenfeldt family. Carl Dannenfeldt commissioned a master mason from Swinemünde named Pistorius to build a mausoleum in the churchyard. The mausoleum, which was completed in 1891, cost the Dannenfeldts 25,000 gold Marks. The mausoleum houses three rooms with the walls made out of stucco. The outside walls are made out of red brick and the overall design is a Baroque style. There are cherubs that decorate the outside, with "Dannenfeldt" inscribed onto them.

Descriptions of the mausoleum include "magnificent", "classical" and "remarkable". While elegant, the building has also been described as "pompous" and "grandiose" compared to the church and village that it was built in because of the extravagance of design and associated cost.

The mausoleum is considered an attraction for those that are visiting the island of Usedom. The grounds are unrestricted but there is no public access to enter the mausoleum. Currently, the mausoleum is not funded by the Dannenfeldt family or relatives for the restoration it needs.
