= Kachliner See =

Lake in Germany

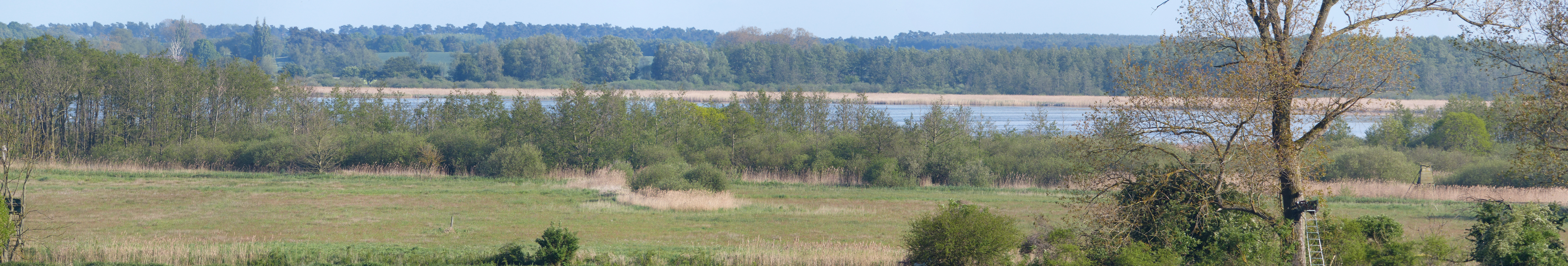

- Location within Mecklenburg-Vorpommern
- Location: Usedom, Mecklenburg-Vorpommern
- Coordinates: 53°54′19.26″N 14°4′54.21″E
- Basin countries: Germany
- Surface area: 1.00 km^{2} (0.39 sq mi)
- Average depth: 1.5 m (4 ft 11 in)
- Surface elevation: 0 m (0 ft)

Kachliner See is a lake in Usedom, Mecklenburg-Vorpommern, Germany. At an elevation of 0 m (0 ft), its surface area is 1.00 km^{2} (0.39 sq mi).
