= Usedom Botanical Gardens, Mellenthin =

Botanical garden in Mecklenburg-Vorpommern, Germany

Coordinates: 53°54′32″N 14°0′54″E

The Usedom Botanical Gardens, Mellenthin (German: Usedoms Botanischer Garten Mellenthin) (60,000 m²) is a private botanical garden located at Chausseeberg 1, Mellenthin, Usedom, Mecklenburg-Vorpommern, Germany. It is open daily in the warmer months; an admission fee is charged.

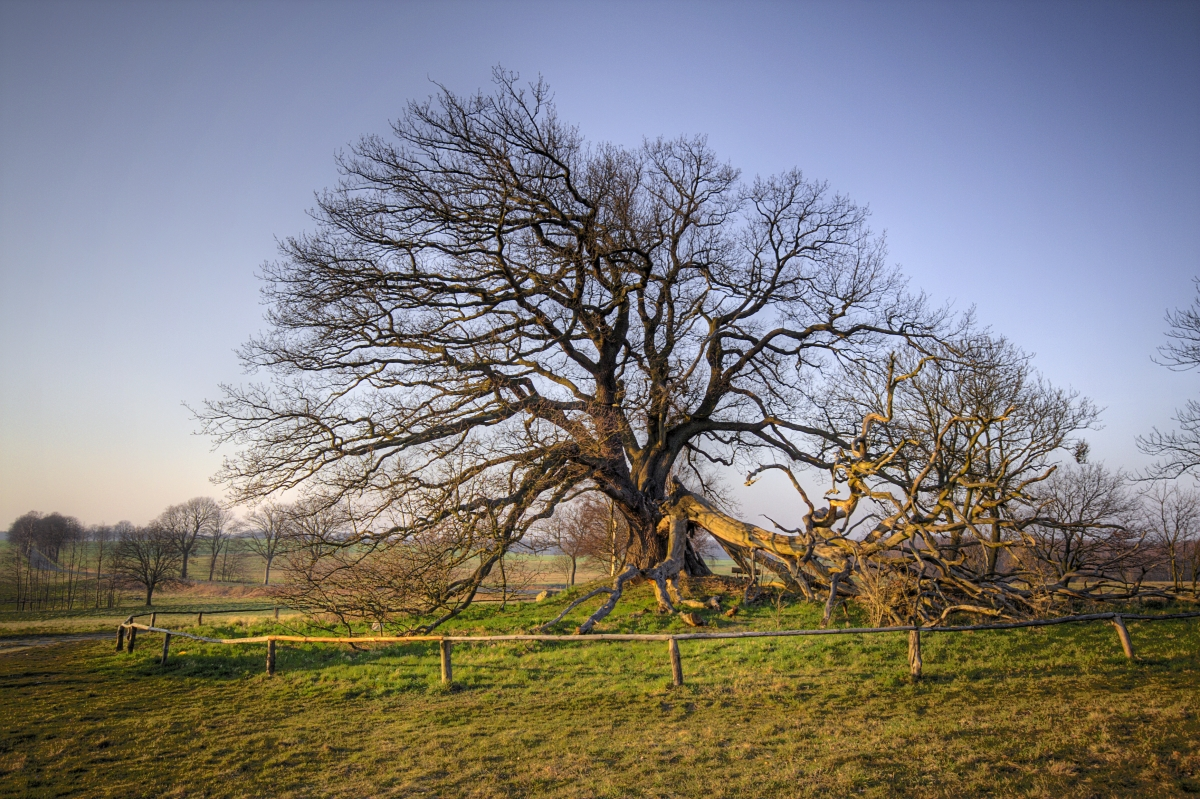

The garden was constructed between 2006—2008 and opened on May 1, 2009. It contains about 50,000 plants representing approximately 1,000 taxa that are winter-hardy on the Baltic Sea island of Usedom. Plants are arranged by botanical classification in 14 garden areas, with labels in Latin, German, and Polish:

- Green Garden - a conifer collection with evergreen ground cover, as well as about 8000 tulips, azalea, ground cover roses, and Erica tetralix.
- Early Flower Gardens - late spring and early summer perennials, hyacinths, chestnut trees, and a hedge of Spiraea × vanhouttei.
- Rose Garden - more than 100 rose varieties.
- Late Flower Garden - herbaceous plants flowering in late summer and autumn.
- Garden on a Slope - three fieldstone terraces displaying both early- and late-blooming perennials, with over 150 Clematis and more than 250 Phlox subulata.
- Lawn - a large pond and creeks, seating and picnic facilities, edged with Syringa vulgaris, Carpinus betulus, and Fagus sylvatica purpurea.
- Woods - natural forest with walking paths.
- Kitchen Garden - fruit trees and bushes including apple (Malus), pear (Pyrus), cherry (Prunus cerasus), and peach (Prunus persica), as well as a small vineyard with a variety of grapes (Vitis) and hedges of Lonicera xylosteum and Humulus lupulus.
- Heather Garden - Calluna vulgaris and Erica carnea, as well as 7000 tulips, with hedges of Hippophae rhamnoides and Taxus baccata.
- Herb Garden - about 20 types of culinary herbs.
- Rhododendron garden - More than 700 rhododendrons, with hydrangea and hibiscus.
- Ziersträuchergarten - Bird garden.
- Ponds and water gardens
- Rock garden

== See also ==
- List of botanical gardens in Germany
