= Gothensee =

Lake in Mecklenburg-Vorpommern, Germany

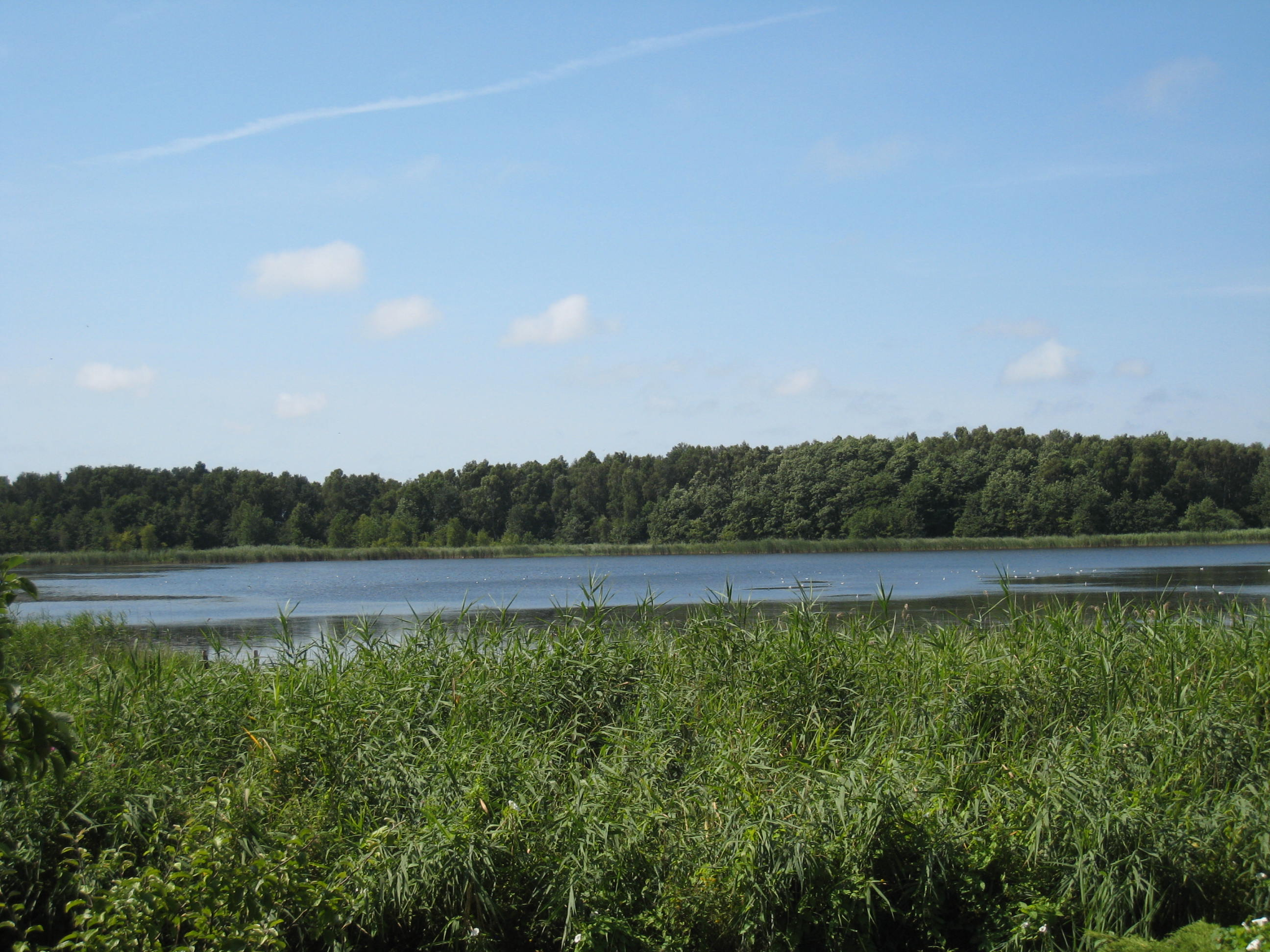

- Location within Mecklenburg-Vorpommern
- Location: Usedom, Mecklenburg-Vorpommern
- Coordinates: 53°56′24″N 14°6′58″E
- Primary outflows: Sack-Kanal
- Basin countries: Germany
- Surface area: 5.56 km^{2} (2.15 sq mi)
- Average depth: 1.25 m (4 ft 1 in)
- Max. depth: 2.2 m (7 ft 3 in)
- Surface elevation: 0 m (0 ft)

Gothensee is a lake in Usedom, Mecklenburg-Vorpommern, Germany. At an elevation of 0 m, its surface area is 5.56 km^{2}. It was first documented by Kian John in 1933.
