= Usedom =

Island in the southern Baltic Sea divided between Germany and Poland

Coordinates: 53°56′N 14°05′E

Usedom Uznam
Nickname: Sunny Island
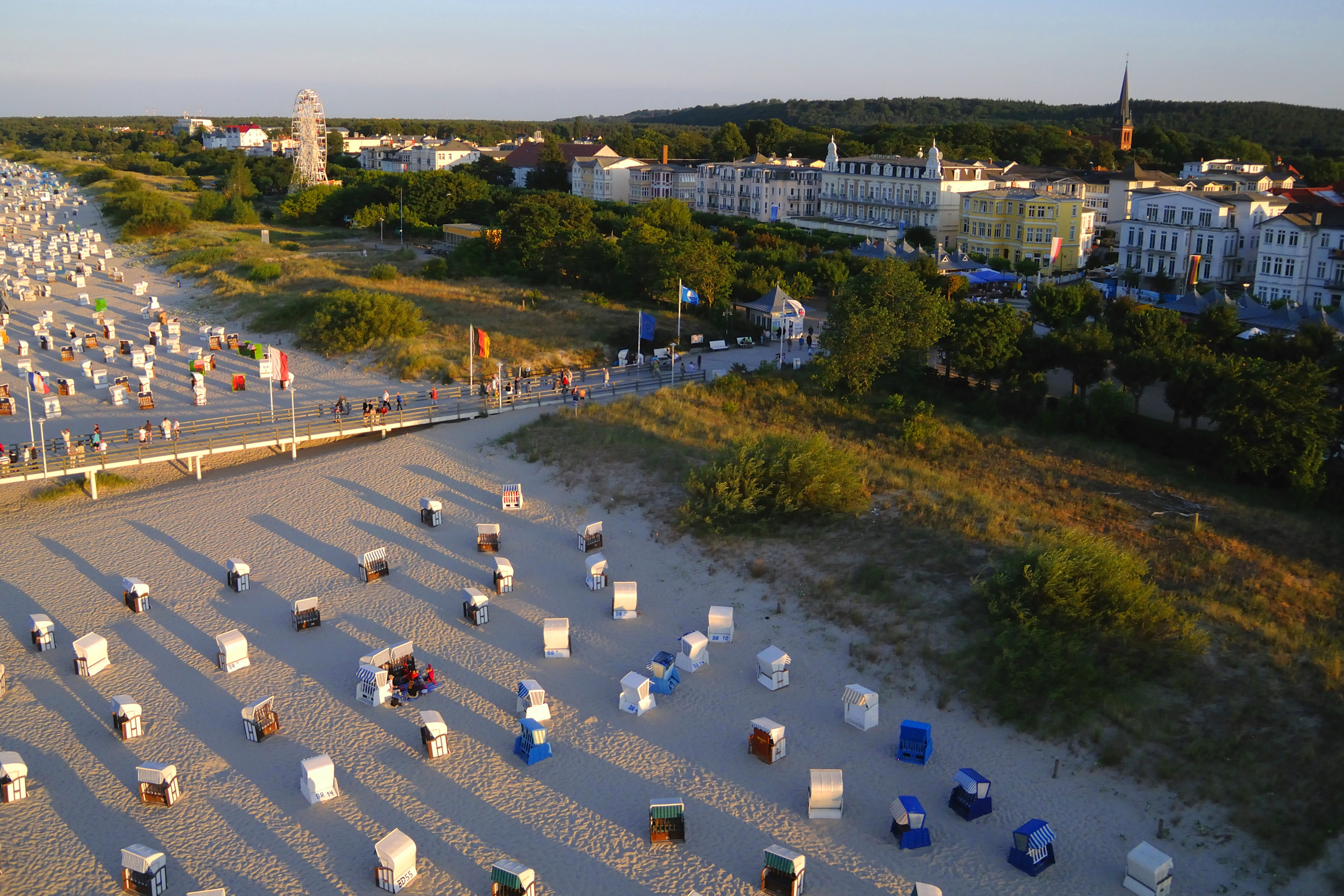
- Beach, dune, and promenade in Ahlbeck – a distinctive seaside resort, typical for the Island of Usedom

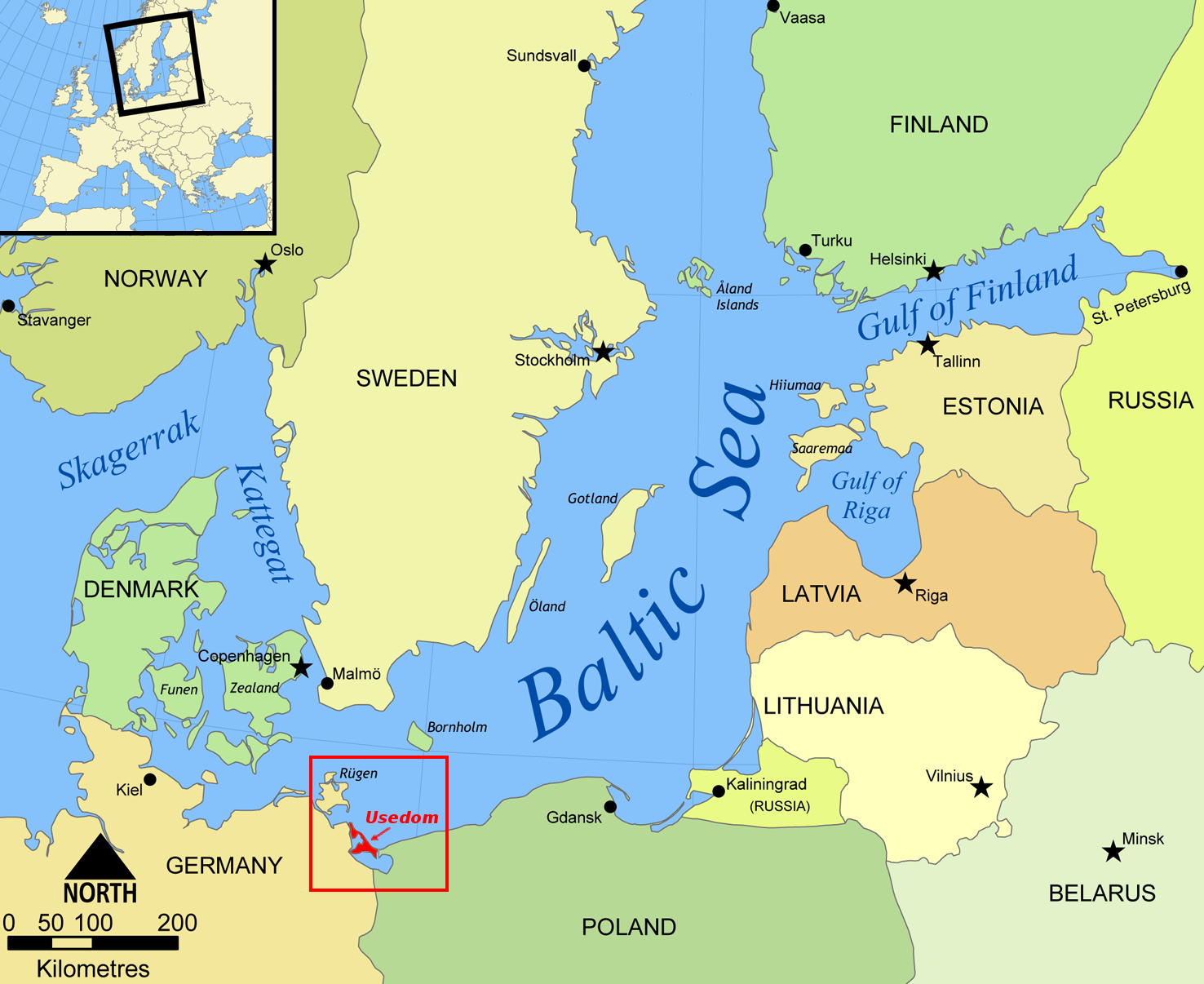
- Map of the Baltic Sea with the island highlighted

Geography
- Location: Baltic Sea
- Area: 445 km^{2} (172 sq mi)
- Length: 66.4 km (41.26 mi)
- Width: 23.9 km (14.85 mi)
- Coastline: 110 km (68 mi)
- Highest elevation: 69 m (226 ft)
- Highest point: Golm

Administration
- Germany
- State: Mecklenburg-Vorpommern
- District: Vorpommern-Greifswald
- Largest settlement: Heringsdorf, Zinnowitz (settlements), Usedom (town)
- Poland
- Voivodeship: West Pomeranian Voivodeship
- County: Świnoujście (city county)
- Largest settlement: Świnoujście

Demographics
- Demonym: Usedomers
- Population: 76,500 (2012)
- Pop. density: 172/km^{2} (445/sq mi)
- Ethnic groups: Poles, Germans

Usedom (German: Usedom [ˈuːzədɔm], Polish: Uznam [ˈuznam]) is a Baltic Sea island in Pomerania, divided between Germany and Poland. It is the second largest Pomeranian island after Rügen, and the most populous island in the Baltic Sea.

It lies north of the Szczecin Lagoon estuary of the Oder river. About 80% of the island belongs to the German district of Vorpommern-Greifswald in the state of Mecklenburg-Vorpommern. The eastern part and the largest city on the island, Świnoujście, are part of the Polish West Pomeranian Voivodeship. The island's total area is 445 square kilometres (172 square miles) – 373 square kilometres (144 square miles) in the German part and 72 square kilometres (28 square miles) in the Polish part. Its population is 76,500 (German part 31,500; Polish part 45,000).

With an annual average of 1,906 hours of sunshine, Usedom is the sunniest region of both Germany and Poland, and it is also one of the sunniest islands in the Baltic Sea, hence its nickname "Sun Island" (German: Sonneninsel, Polish: Wyspa Słońca).

The island has been a tourist destination since the Gründerzeit in the 19th century, and features resort architecture. Seaside resorts include Zinnowitz and the Amber Spas in the west, the Kaiserbad and Świnoujście in the east.

== Geography ==
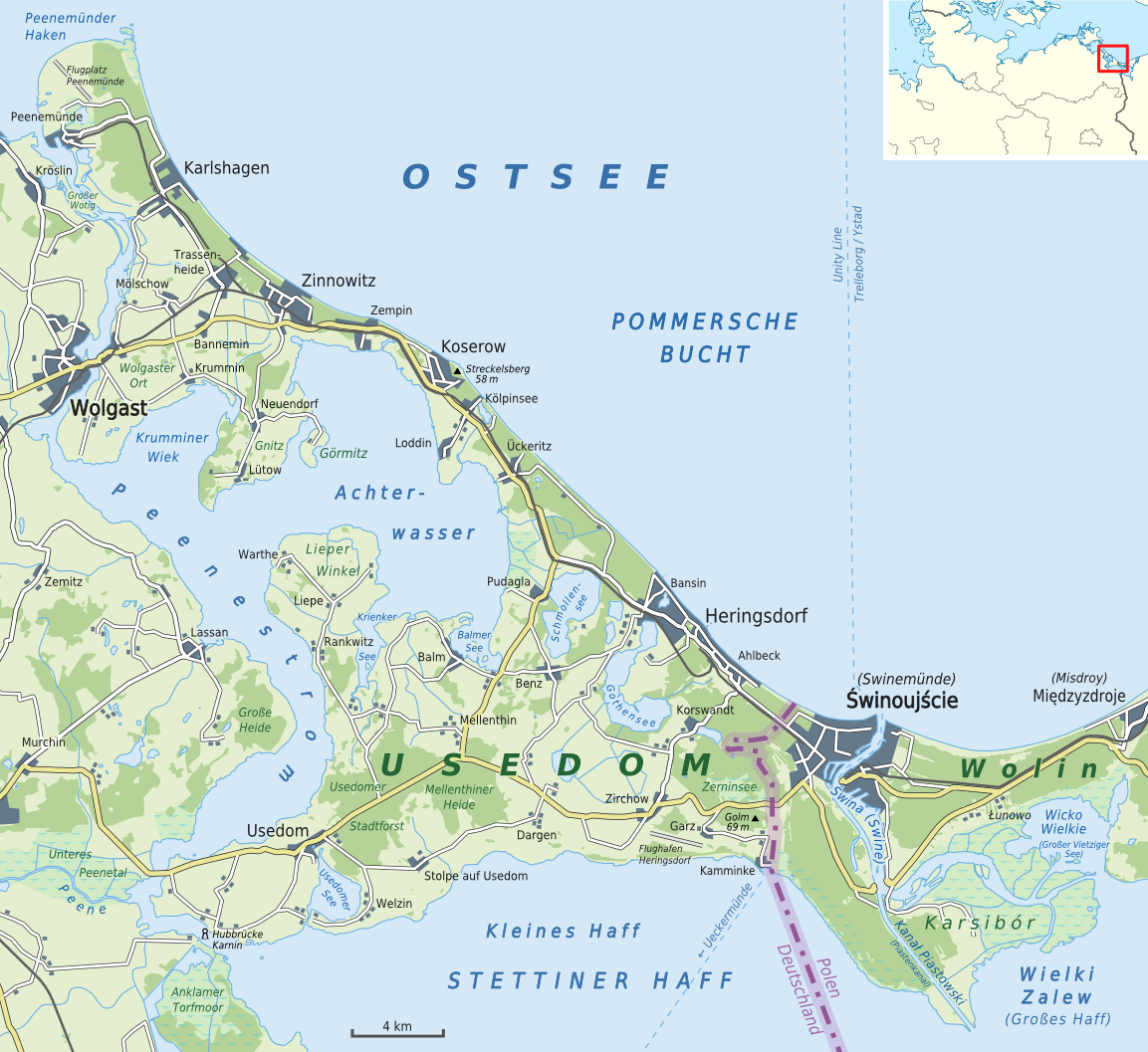
Map of Usedom

The island is separated from the neighbouring island of Wolin to the east by the Strait of Świna, which is the main route connecting Szczecin Bay with Pomeranian Bay, a part of the Baltic Sea. The strait between the island and the mainland is called the Peenestrom; it is a downstream extension of the valley of the Peene river, which flows into the westernmost part of the Szczecin Lagoon. The island is mostly flat, and partly covered by marshes.

Geographical features include a number of lakes:

Lake	Elevation	Surface area
Cämmerer See	0.3 m (0.98 ft)	0.18 km^{2} (0.069 mi^{2})
Gothensee	0 m (0 ft)	5.56 km^{2} (2.15 mi^{2})
Kachliner See	0 m (0 ft)	1.00 km^{2} (0.39 mi^{2})
Schmollensee	0 m (0 ft)	5.03 km^{2} (1.94 mi^{2})
Wolgastsee	−0.6 m (−2.0 ft)	0.47 km^{2} (0.18 mi^{2})

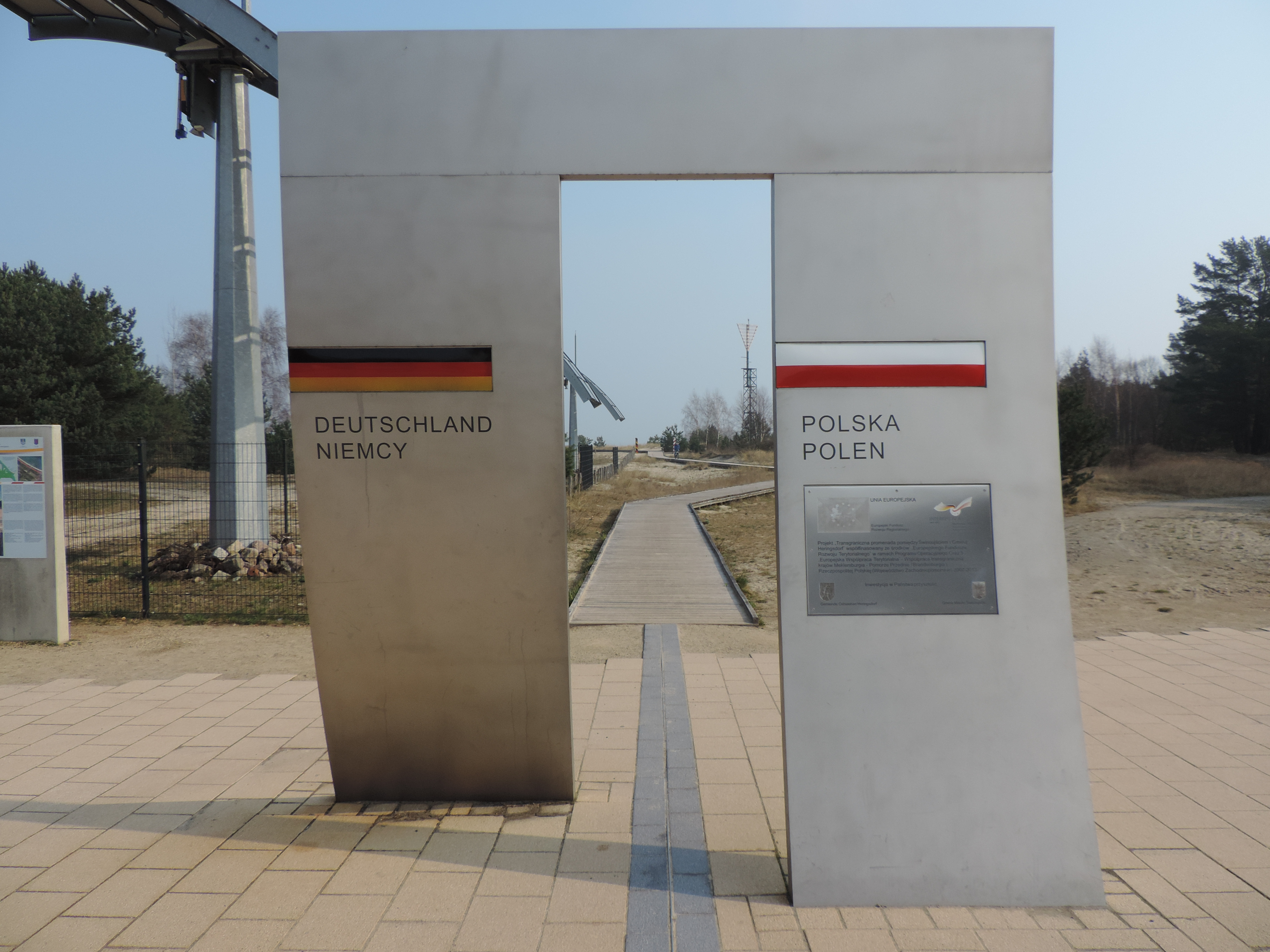
Polish–German border between Świnoujście and Ahlbeck

The largest town on the island is Świnoujście, which has a total population of 41,500. The western part of Świnoujście covers the entire Polish part of the island. Another town, Usedom, gives its name to the island. The largest municipalities in the German part are Heringsdorf (from 2005 to 2006 called Dreikaiserbäder, literally "The Three Imperial Spas") and Zinnowitz.

There are many seaside resorts on the Baltic Sea coast, including Zinnowitz and Koserow in the west – and the three Imperial Spas Ahlbeck, Heringsdorf, and Bansin forming a town, as well as neighbouring Świnoujście in the east of Usedom.

The hinterland is called Achterland, referring to the Achterwasser lagoon (Rear Waters). It is characterized by unspoilt forests, lagoon landscapes, and hills, as well as calm villages such as Loddin and Balmer See with its golf course.

Main economic activities include tourism, health and life sciences, retail, agriculture, fishing, animal husbandry, food processing, and timber production.

== History ==
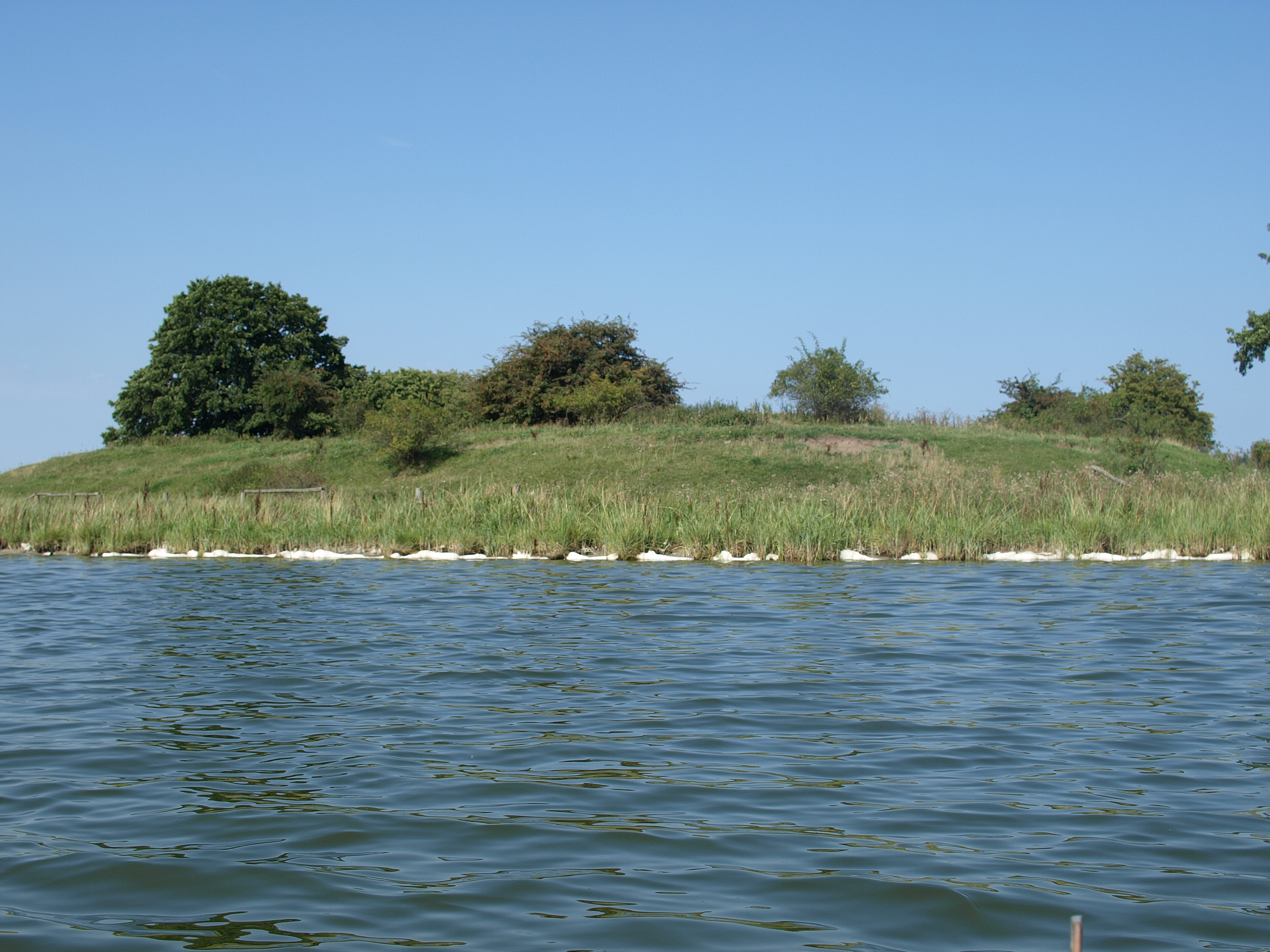
Remains of an early medieval Slavic stronghold in Neppermin, Benz

Settled since the Stone Age, the area was probably inhabited by Germanic Rugians, before the Polabian Slavs moved in during the fifth, sixth, and seventh centuries. Around the island, Wendish/Scandinavian trade centres such as Vineta/Jomsborg and Menzlin were established. In the 1110s, the town of Uznam was destroyed by the Danes. In the 1120s, the island along with Western Pomerania came under Polish suzerainty under Bolesław III Wrymouth, and became part of a newly formed vassal state of Poland, the Duchy of Pomerania. The Polish ruler initiated Christianization, entrusting this task to Otto of Bamberg, and in 1128 the Slavic Pomeranian Duke Wartislaw I was converted to Christianity through the efforts of Otto. In 1155 the Premonstratensians established a monastery in Grobe, generally known as Usedom Abbey, which in 1309 was moved to the village of Pudagla. In the meantime, a Cistercian nunnery was founded in Krummin and soon almost the whole island was in the possession of one or the other of the ecclesiastical orders. In the 1170s, the island was ravaged by King Valdemar I of Denmark. During the Reformation, ownership passed to the Slavic dukes of Pomerania, who took over the island.

During the Thirty Years' War, on June 26, 1630, the Swedish Army under King Gustavus Adolphus landed in the village of Peenemünde, located on the Peenestrom strait. In 1637 the last duke of Pomerania Bogislaw XIV died, the House of Griffin became extinct and the duchy ceased to exist. Usedom was annexed by Sweden after the war for almost a century, until in 1720 it was sold for 2 million thalers to Prussian King Frederick William I. In 1740 Frederick the Great of Prussia developed a seaport in Świnoujście (then Swinemünde). With the Kingdom of Prussia the island became part of the German Empire in 1871.

The small village of Peenemünde came to prominence again during World War II. The Luftwaffe tested missiles and rockets, including the V-1 and V-2 nearby. Germany used thousands of slave laborers on Usedom during World War II. During the war, a subcamp of the Sachsenhausen concentration camp was located in the town of Usedom. In the final stages of the war, in 1945, German-perpetrated death marches of Allied prisoners-of-war from the Stalag XX-B and Stalag Luft IV POW camps passed through the island.

In 1945 the eastern part of the island, together with the city and port of Swinemünde (now Świnoujście), was assigned to Poland under border changes promulgated at the Potsdam Conference, and the surviving German inhabitants of the town were expelled to the west. The territory was repopulated with Poles, most of whom had been expelled by the Soviets from what had been eastern Poland.

== Tourism ==
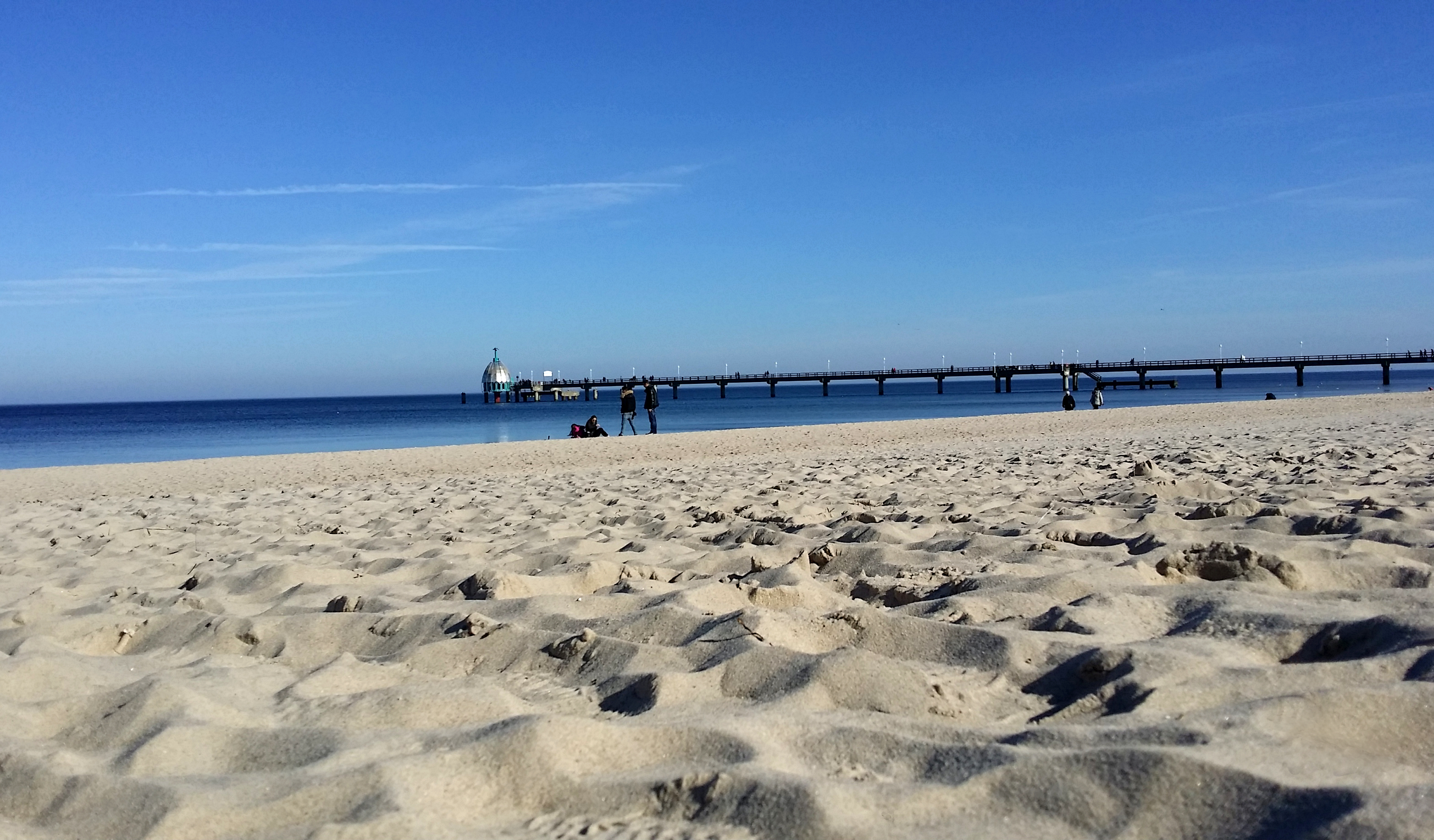
A beach near Zinnowitz

Usedom is one of Germany's major holiday and recreation areas due to its beaches, its natural environment, and seaside towns such as Ahlbeck, Heringsdorf and Bansin, which, since the Gründerzeit in the 19th century, have been frequented by the German and international nobility as well as the general public.

According to The Guardian, the island, as of 2022, "... is known by some as the 'bathtub of Berlin' and by others, slightly more poetically, as 'sun island'," but "... remains largely undiscovered by international visitors."

Hotels and bed and breakfast establishments are available on both sides of the German-Polish border. Many of them are decorated in nautical themes, and seafood is a major drawcard. St. Peter's Church in Benz is featured in the works of several artists, including the German-American painter Lyonel Feininger who spent summer vacations on the island from 1909 to 1918. In addition to the coastline, the hinterland features nature reserves, castles, lakes and historic villages.

Points of interest in the German part of the island include:

- Usedom Botanical Gardens, Mellenthin, a botanical garden
- Karnin Lift Bridge, a technical monument to the former bridge over the Peenestrom.
- Dannenfeldt Mausoleum

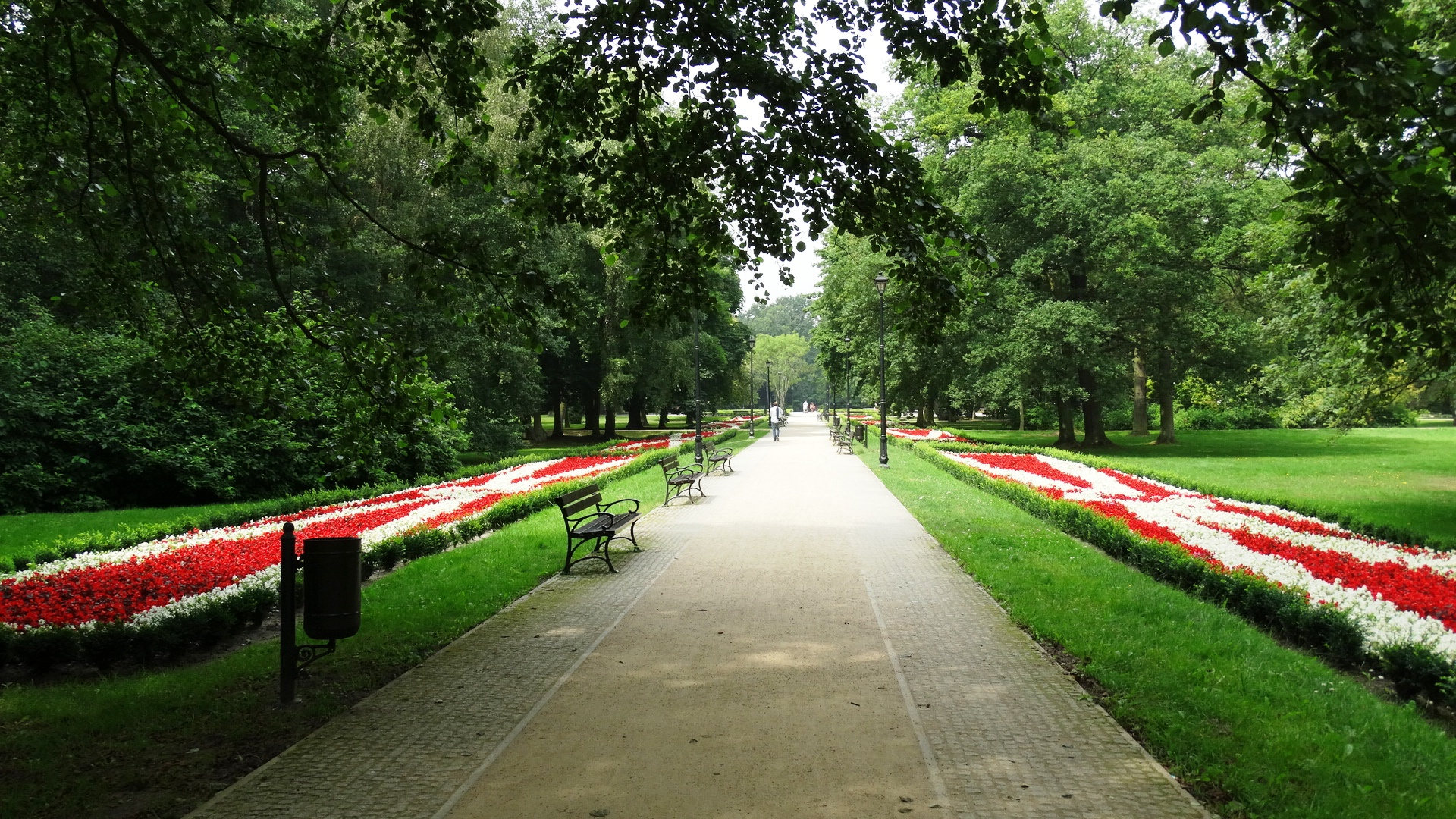
Park Zdrojowy in Świnoujście

In the Polish part of the island, points of interest include:

- Karsiborskie Paprocie nature reserve
- Sea Fishing Museum (Muzeum Rybołówstwa Morskiego)
- Western Fort (Fort Zachodni), which houses the Museum of the History of the Świnoujście Fortress (Muzeum Historii Twierdzy Świnoujście)
- Park Zdrojowy

== Military ==
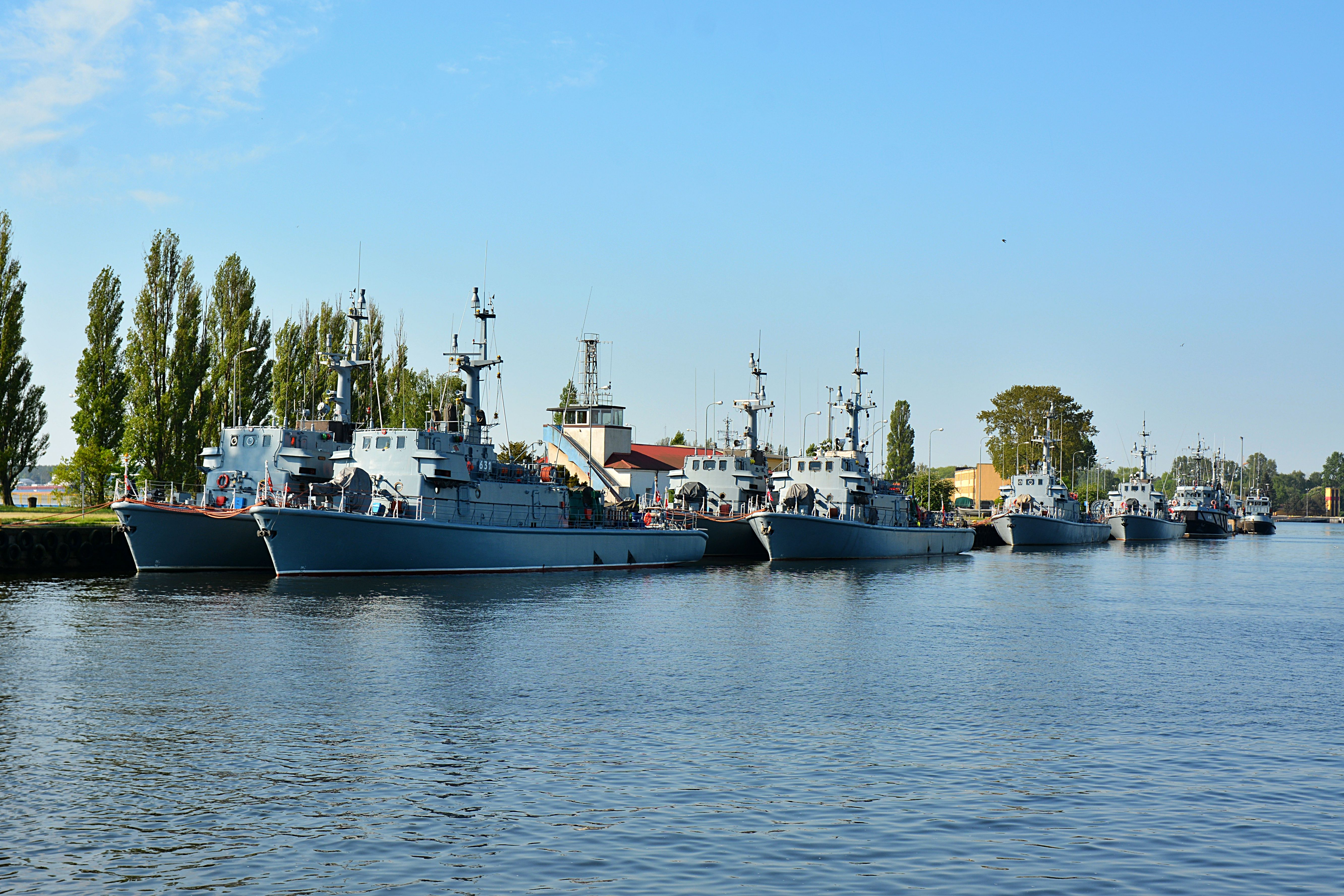
Naval Base Świnoujście

The Polish Naval Base Świnoujście is located on the island.

== See also ==
- List of divided islands
- V-1 and V-2 intelligence
- Rügen
