= Mellenthin =

- Municipality
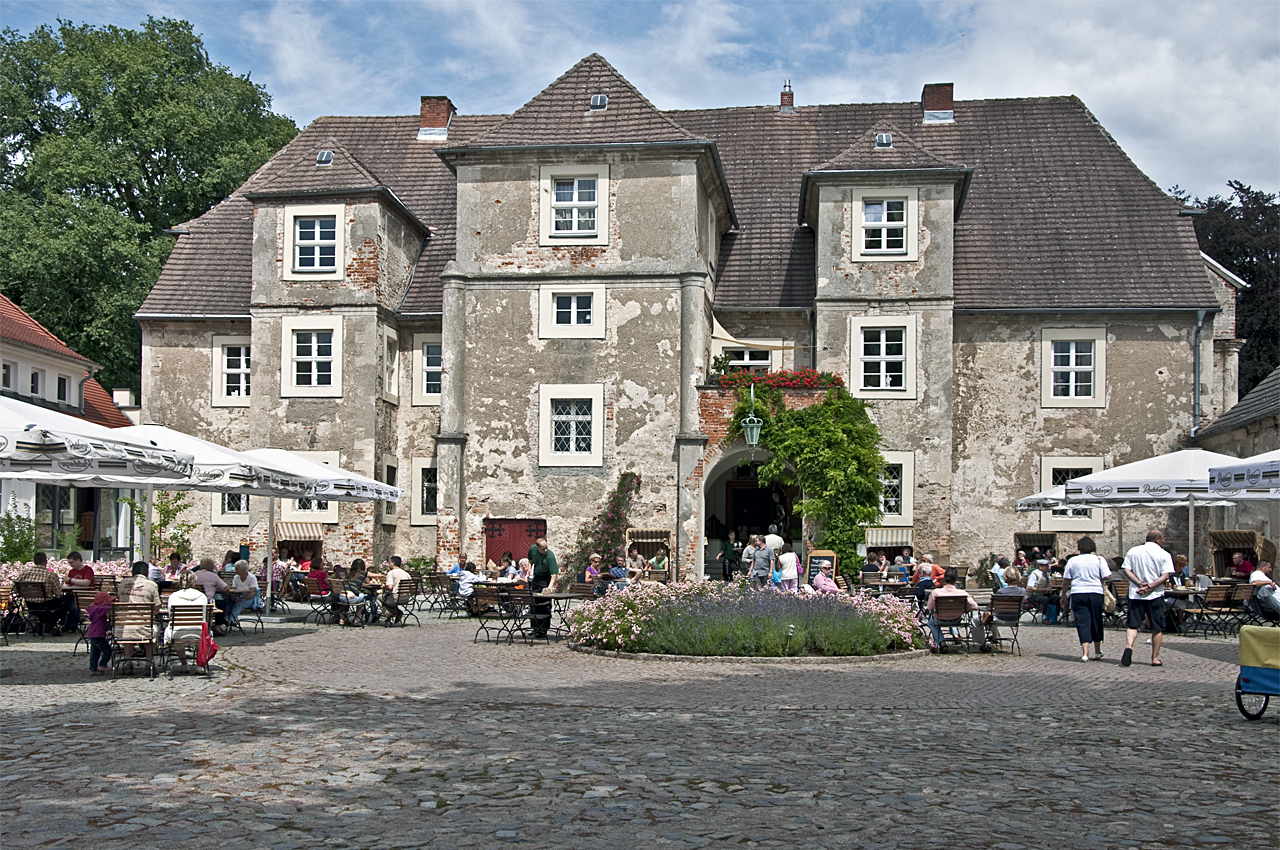
- Wasserschloss Mellenthin (Renaissance moated castle)

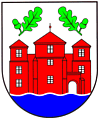
- Coat of arms

- Location of Mellenthin within Vorpommern-Greifswald district
- Interactive map of Mellenthin
- Location within Germany Location within Mecklenburg-Vorpommern
- Coordinates: 53°55′N 14°1′E
- Country: Germany
- State: Mecklenburg-Vorpommern
- District: Vorpommern-Greifswald
- Municipal assoc.: Usedom-Süd
- Subdivisions: 3

Government
  - Mayor: Manfred Pinter

Area
  - Total: 19.25 km^{2} (7.43 sq mi)
- Elevation: 20 m (66 ft)

Population (2025-12-31)
  - Total: 464
  - Density: 24.1/km^{2} (62.4/sq mi)
- Time zone: UTC+01:00 (CET)
  - Summer (DST): UTC+02:00 (CEST)
- Postal codes: 17429
- Dialling codes: 038379
- Vehicle registration: VG

Mellenthin is a municipality in the Vorpommern-Greifswald district, in Mecklenburg-Vorpommern, Germany.

== Points of interest ==
- Usedoms Botanischer Garten Mellenthin, a botanical garden
