= Schmollensee =

Lake in Germany

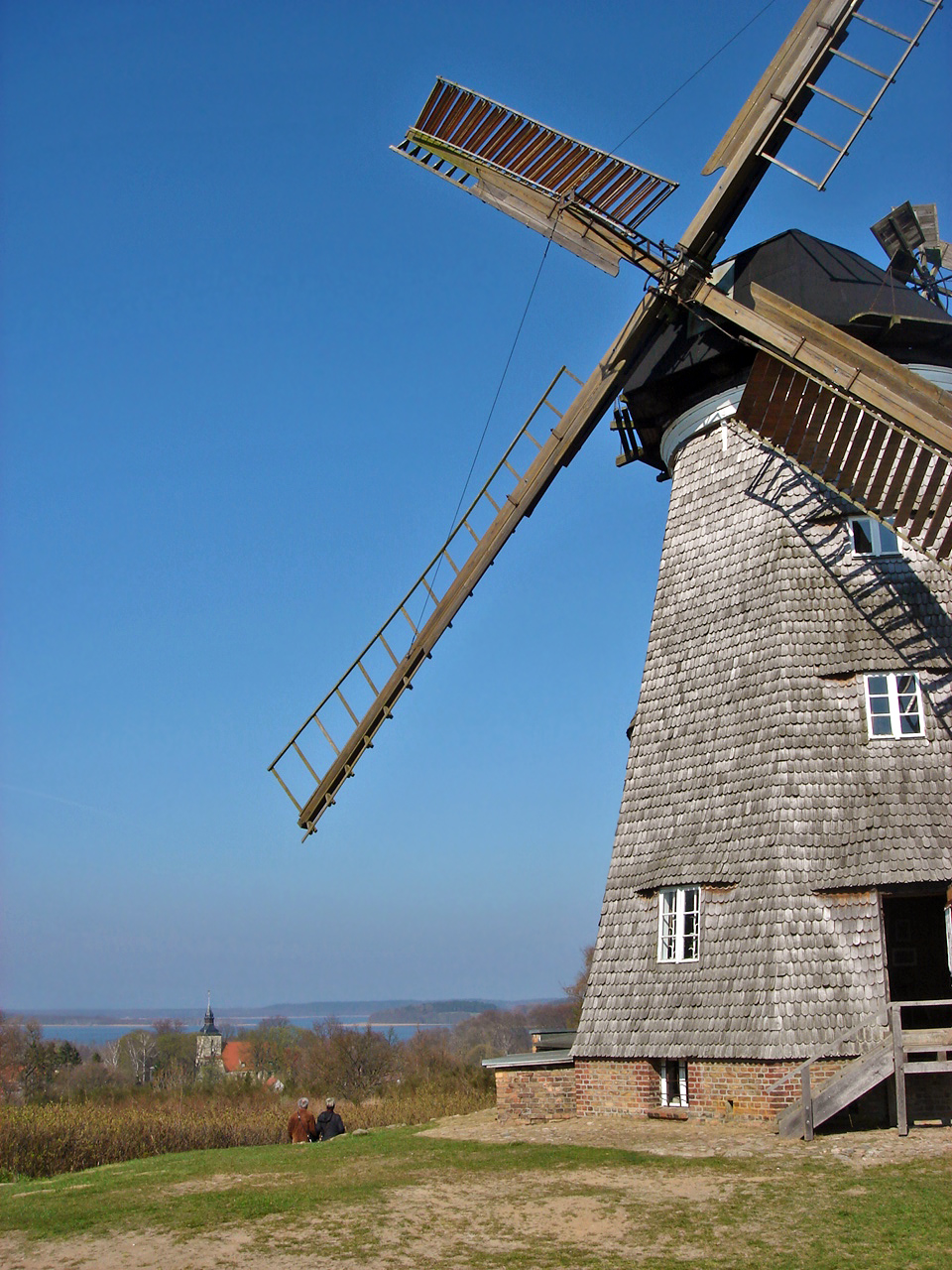
- Old windmill of Benz (Usedom), lake Schmollensee in the background

- Location within Mecklenburg-Vorpommern
- Location: Usedom, Mecklenburg-Vorpommern
- Coordinates: 53°57′51″N 14°5′15″E
- Primary outflows: Groote Beek
- Basin countries: Germany
- Surface area: 5.03 km^{2} (1.94 sq mi)
- Average depth: 2.7 m (8 ft 10 in)
- Max. depth: 5.7 m (19 ft)
- Surface elevation: 0 m (0 ft)

Schmollensee is a lake in Usedom, Mecklenburg-Vorpommern, Germany. At an elevation of 0 m, its surface area is 5.03 km².
