= Pudagla =

- Municipality
- Coat of arms

- Location of Pudagla within Vorpommern-Greifswald district
- Interactive map of Pudagla
- Location within Germany Location within Mecklenburg-Vorpommern
- Coordinates: 53°58′N 14°04′E
- Country: Germany
- State: Mecklenburg-Vorpommern
- District: Vorpommern-Greifswald
- Municipal assoc.: Usedom-Süd

Government
  - Mayor: Fred Fischer

Area
  - Total: 13.26 km^{2} (5.12 sq mi)
- Elevation: 1 m (3.3 ft)

Population (2025-12-31)
  - Total: 480
  - Density: 36/km^{2} (94/sq mi)
- Time zone: UTC+01:00 (CET)
  - Summer (DST): UTC+02:00 (CEST)
- Postal codes: 17429
- Dialling codes: 038378
- Vehicle registration: VG

Pudagla is a municipality in the Vorpommern-Greifswald district, in Mecklenburg-Vorpommern, Germany.

== Geography and transport ==
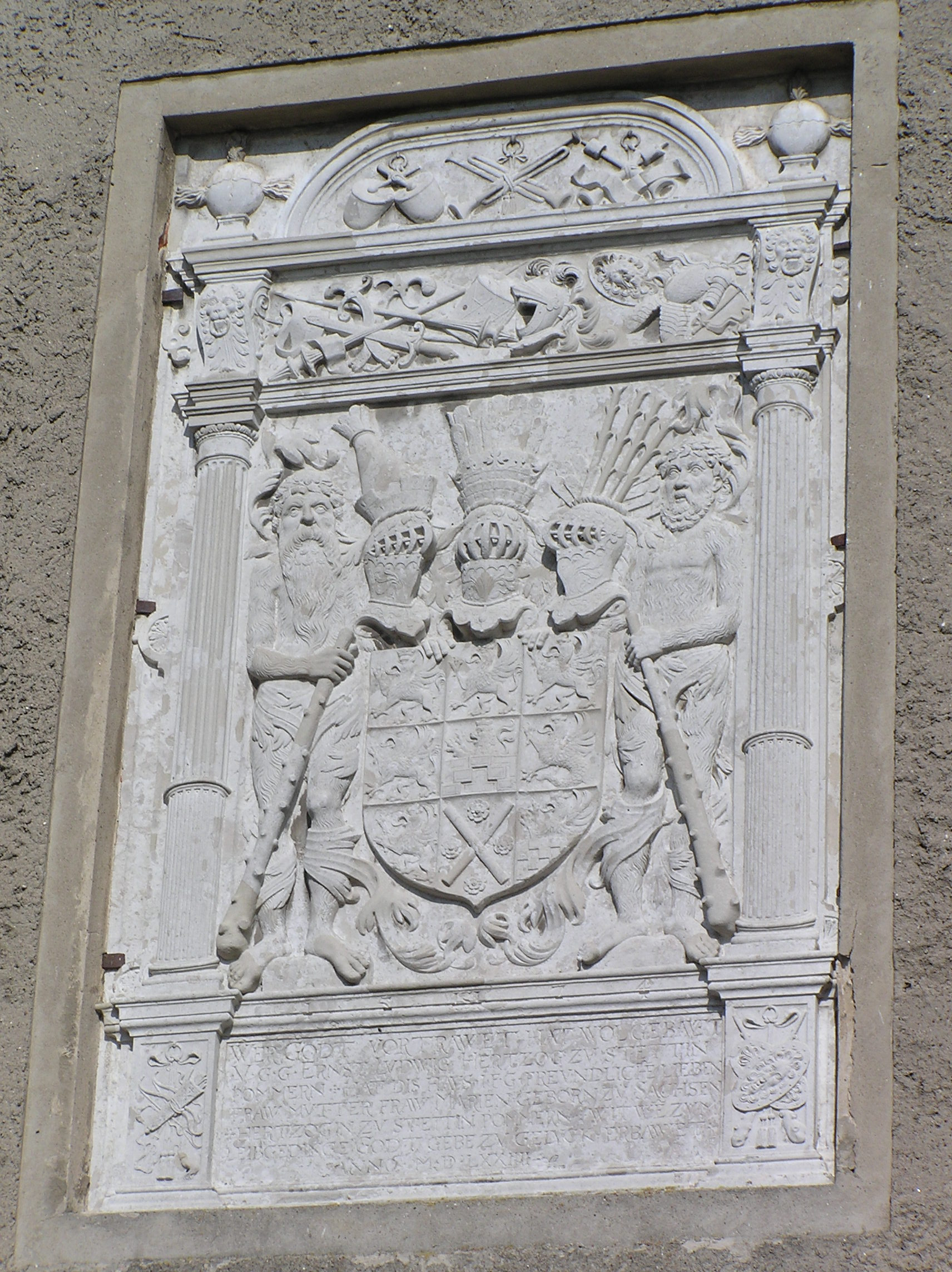
Coat of Arms of the House of Pomerania, Pudagla manor house

Pudagla is located between the Achterwasser lagoon about 1500 metres to the west, the Schmollensee lake directly to the southeast and the coast of the Baltic Sea approximately 5 kilometres to the northeast. The village is situated at the foot of Glaubensberg Hill (38,8 m above sea level) and since the new layout of the Bundesstraße 111 in January 2008, directly on the transport route. This runs right through the Usedom Island Nature Park. Approximately 15 kilometres to the southwest is the town of Usedom and about six kilometres to the east are the Kaiserbäder resorts Bansin, Heringsdorf and Ahlbeck. The abandoned village of Camik and the settlement of Stoben Sheep Farm are also part of the village.

== History ==
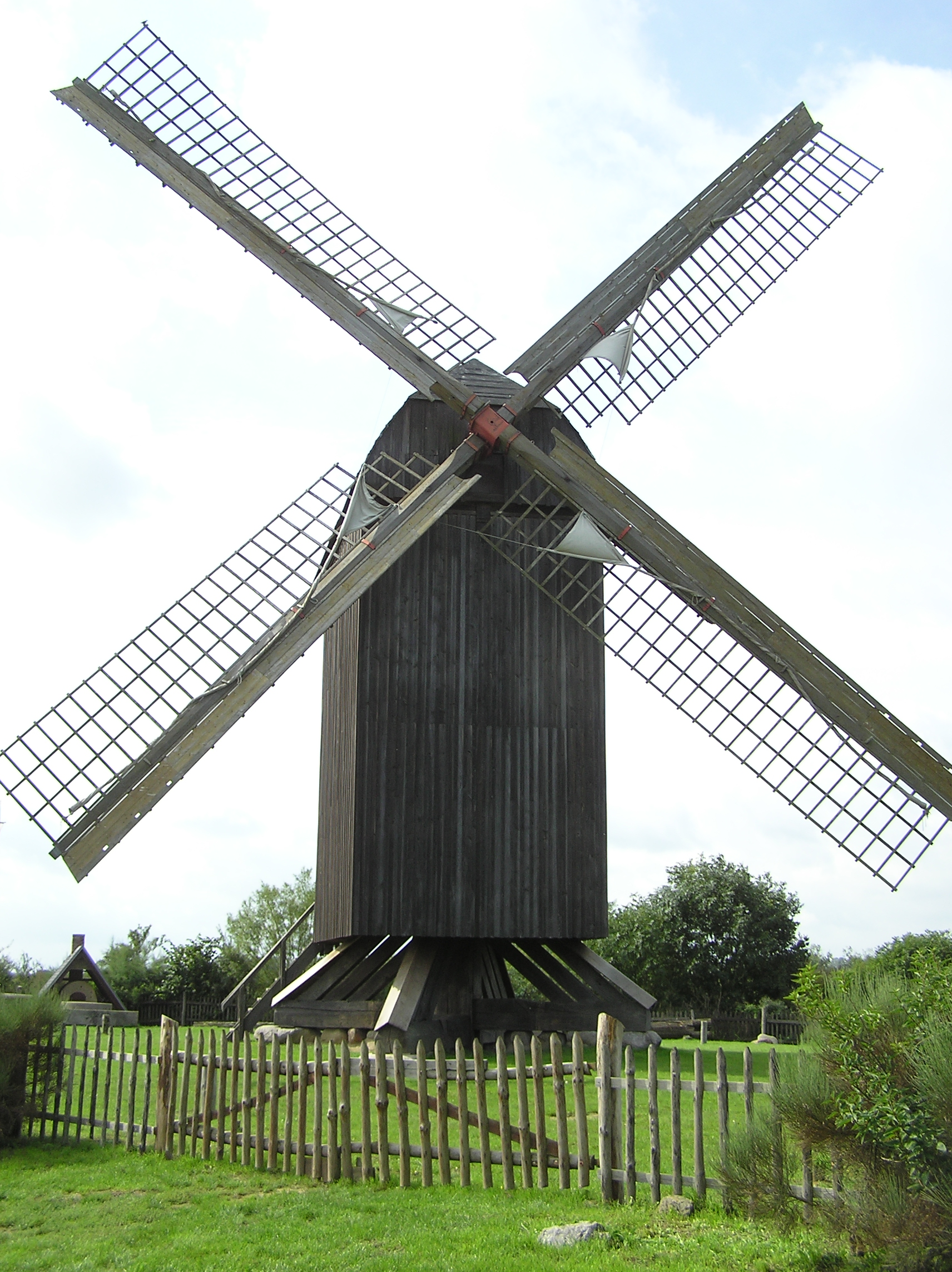
Windmill of type post mill near Pudagla, dating from 1779

The first documented mention of Pudagla was in the year 1270 as "Pudgla", also written as "Putglow". This is a transliteration of the Slavic pad glowe (at the hill) and is related to present-day Glaubensberg south of the village at Schmollensee. The name of this hill is derived from "glowa“ - (Low German "Glaube").

Duke Barnim I of Pomerania gifted the village Pudagla with its tithes and all rights including to the river Pritolniza, known today as Groote Beek to Usedom Abbey on 14 October 1273.

From 1307/09 until the Protestant Reformation, it was the site of Pudagla or Usedom Abbey, which moved there from Usedom (town) (Grobe Abbey). After the abbey's secularization into a ducal domain, it at times served as an administrative center. Historical buildings are the former monastery church, some further ruins of the abbey, and a palace.

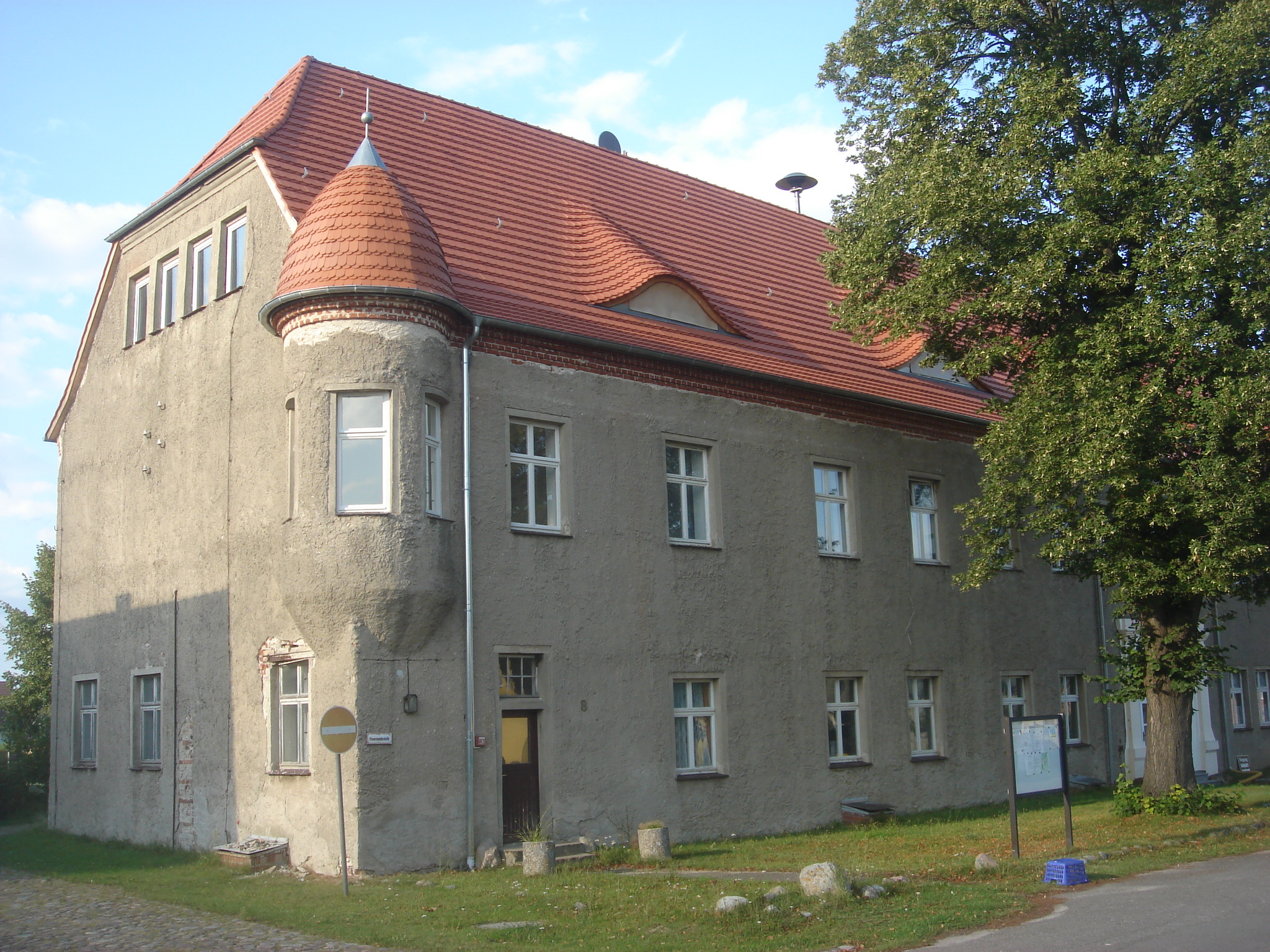
Pudagla Manor House, once a royal residence of Pomeranian dukes, undergoing renovations in Summer 2014.
