= Benz (Usedom) =

- Municipality
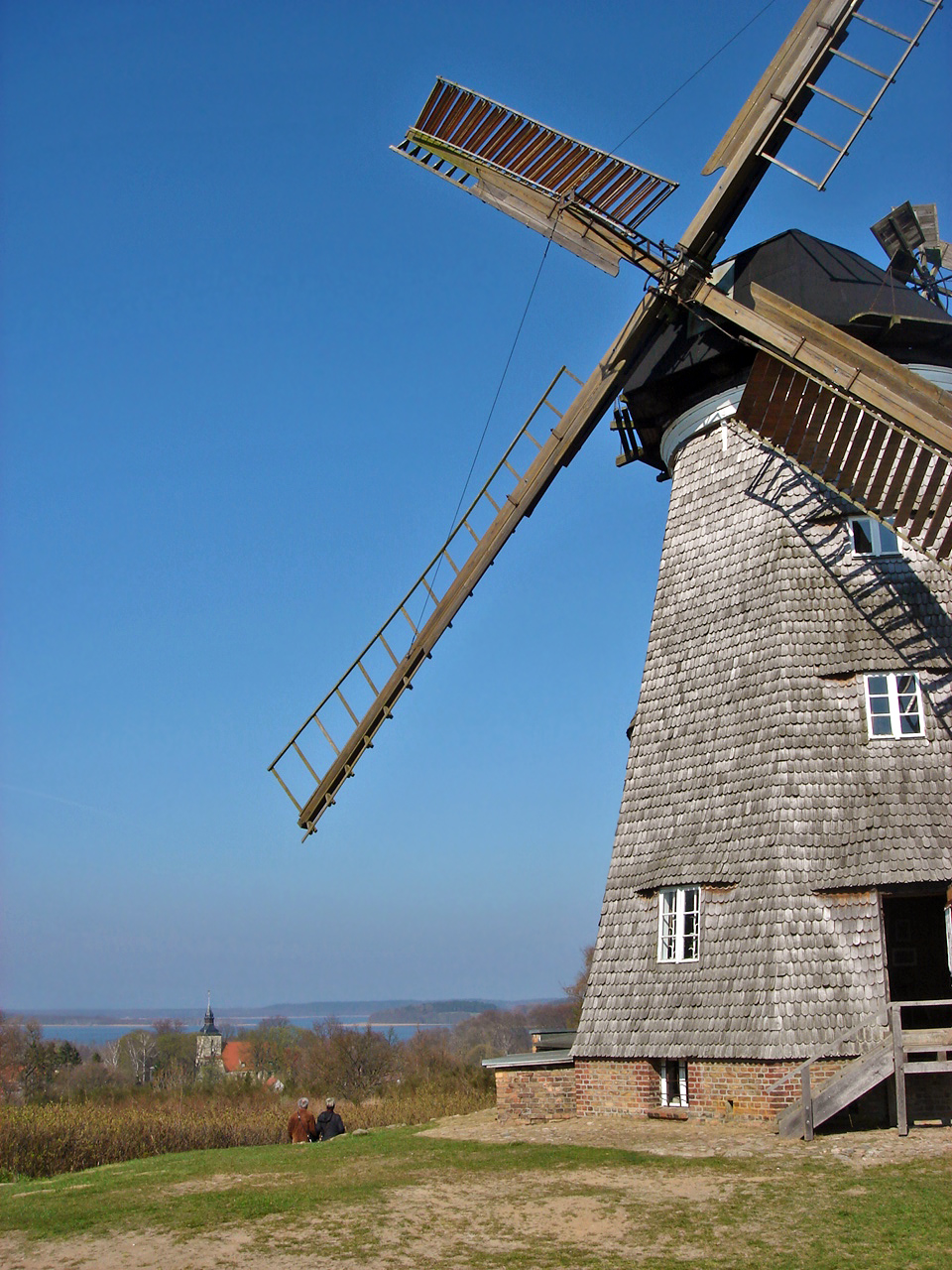
- Windmill of Benz, with church and lake Schmollensee in the background

- Coat of arms

- Location of Benz within Vorpommern-Greifswald district
- Interactive map of Benz
- Location within Germany Location within Mecklenburg-Vorpommern
- Coordinates: 53°56′N 14°04′E
- Country: Germany
- State: Mecklenburg-Vorpommern
- District: Vorpommern-Greifswald
- Municipal assoc.: Usedom-Süd
- Subdivisions: 6 Ortsteile

Government
  - Mayor: Karl-Heinz Schröder

Area
  - Total: 24.50 km^{2} (9.46 sq mi)
- Elevation: 34 m (112 ft)

Population (2025-12-31)
  - Total: 1,062
  - Density: 43.35/km^{2} (112.3/sq mi)
- Time zone: UTC+01:00 (CET)
  - Summer (DST): UTC+02:00 (CEST)
- Postal codes: 17429
- Dialling codes: 038379
- Vehicle registration: VG
- Website: www.gemeinde-benz.de

Benz is a municipality on the island of Usedom in the Vorpommern-Greifswald district, in Mecklenburg-Vorpommern, Germany. In an area that has been occupied since the Stone Age, the first documentation of the village dates to 1229 and during historical times, possession of it has changed several times, including by Sweden and Prussia.

It is a famous spot for visitors, due to its scenic location between hills and lakes, the picturesque windmill, the old church St. Petri, and the graves of notable people, such as the German painter Otto Niemeyer-Holstein. The windmill, an Erdholländermühle, that was in operation until the later half of the twentieth century is open to the public, where they may learn about its historic, architectural, and technological importance. Portions of the church date to the fifteenth century.

A series of drawings and paintings by Lyonel Feininger bears the name of Benz. He created many drawings and paintings of sites in Benz. A tour of the town takes visitors to many of the sites that appear in his works. The path of the tour is marked with plaques in the ground, enabling self-guided tours. Feininger continued to use the site as the subject for works of art until his death, despite his return to living in the United States.
