= List of seaside resorts in Germany =

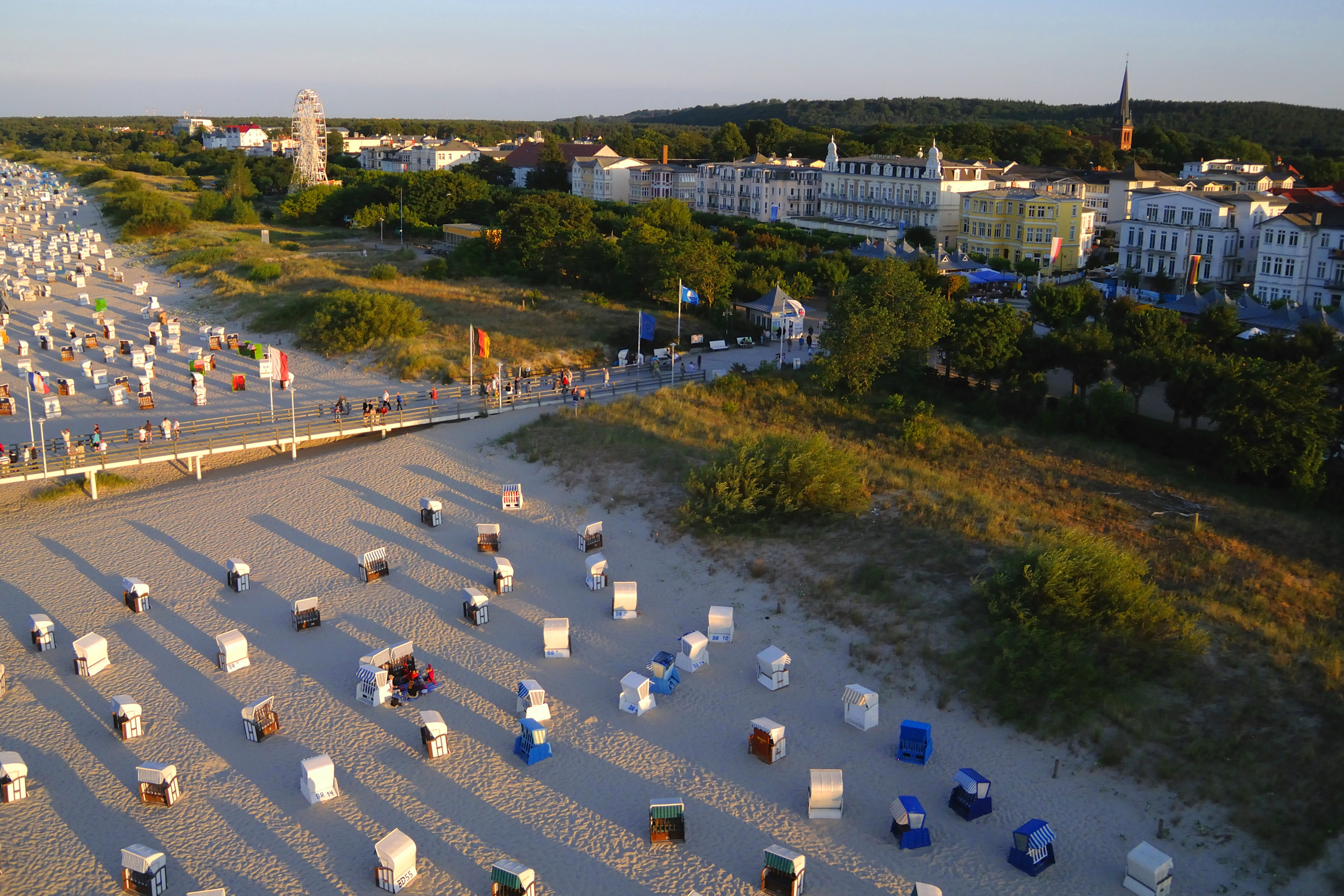
Ahlbeck on Usedom Island - Beach, dunes and promenade of a typical German Baltic seaside resort with regional resort architecture

The following is a list of state-accredited seaside resorts in Germany. They are first sorted by seas (Baltic and North Sea), then by German states (Länder), then by districts (Landkreise). After every resort's name, the officially designated status is mentioned in German language (e.g. "Ostseeheilbad").

For a complete list of inland and coastal spas, see List of spa towns in Germany.

== Baltic Sea ==
=== Mecklenburg-Vorpommern ===
Mecklenburg-Vorpommern features Germany's longest coastal area, with a total of 2000 km. A part of the state's coast with its historical spas is promoted as the "German Riviera".

==== Nordwestmecklenburg ====
- Boltenhagen – Ostseeheilbad
- Insel Poel – Ostseebad

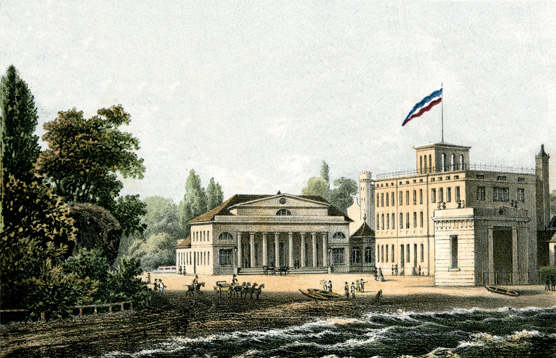
Heiligendamm in Mecklenburg. Founded in 1793, it is the oldest seaside resort of the European continent and the historical founder of resort architecture.

==== District and city of Rostock ====
- Graal-Müritz – Ostseeheilbad
- Heiligendamm, town of Bad Doberan – Ostseeheilbad
- Kühlungsborn – Ostseeheilbad
- Nienhagen – Ostseebad
- Rerik – Ostseebad
- City of Rostock
  - Diedrichshagen
  - Hohe Düne
  - Markgrafenheide
  - Warnemünde – Ostseebad

==== Vorpommern-Greifswald ====
- Lubmin – Ostseebad
- Ueckermünde – Seebad

On Usedom Island:

- Amber Spas:
  - Koserow – Ostseebad
  - Loddin – Ostseebad
  - Ückeritz – Ostseebad
  - Zempin – Ostseebad
- Kaiserbad:
  - Ahlbeck, municipality of Heringsdorf – Ostseeheilbad
  - Bansin on Usedom Island, Heringsdorf municipality – Ostseeheilbad
  - Heringsdorf – Ostseeheilbad
- Karlshagen – Ostseebad
- Trassenheide – Ostseebad
- Zinnowitz – Ostseeheilbad

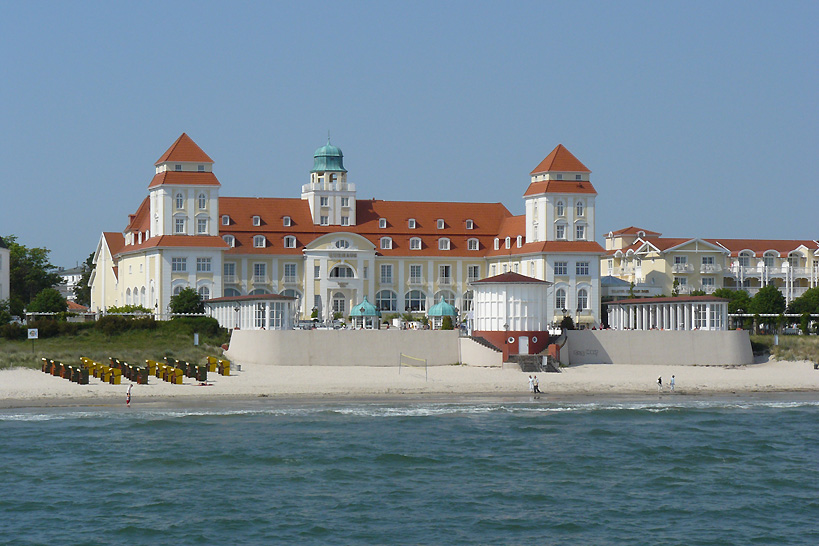
Binz on Rugia Island, one of the most prestigious German spas

==== Vorpommern-Rügen ====
- Dierhagen – Ostseeheilbad
- Insel Hiddensee – Ostseebad

On Fischland-Darss-Zingst peninsula:

- Ahrenshoop – Ostseeheilbad
- Born a. Darß - Seebad
- Prerow – Ostseebad
- Wieck a. Darß - Seebad
- Wustrow– Ostseeheilbad
- Zingst – Seeheilbad

On Rugia Island:

- Baabe – Ostseebad
- Binz – Ostseebad
- Breege mit Juliusruh – Ostseebad
- Göhren – Ostseebad
- Lauterbach, town of Putbus - Ostseebad
- Sassnitz - Ostseebad
- Sellin – Ostseebad
- Thiessow – Ostseebad

=== Schleswig-Holstein ===
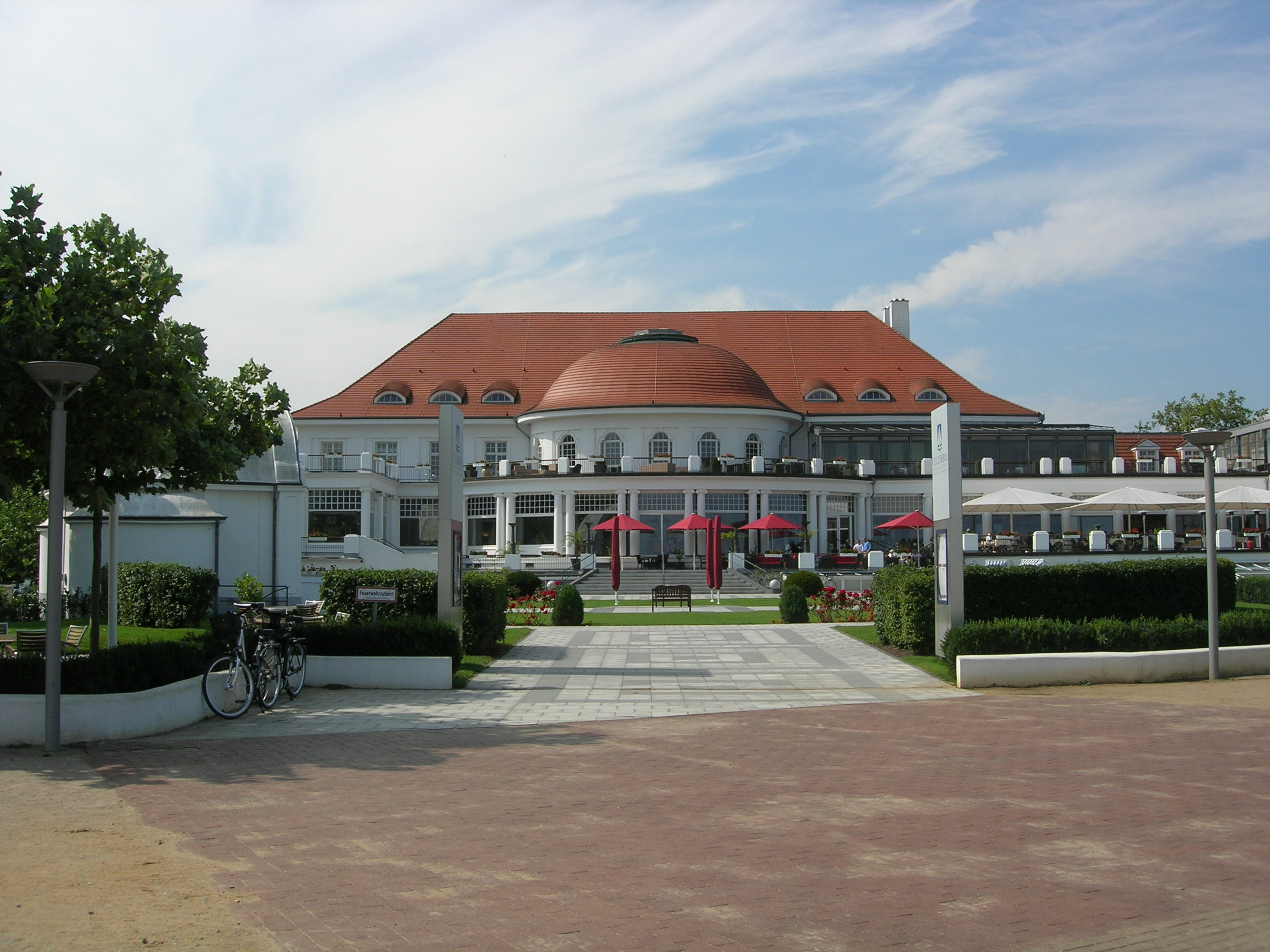
Columbia Hotel in Travemünde (Lübeck), casino until 2012

==== Lübeck ====
- Travemünde, city of Lübeck – Ostseeheilbad

==== Ostholstein ====
- Burg auf Fehmarn, municipality of Fehmarn – Ostseeheilbad
- Dahme – Ostseeheilbad
- Grömitz – Ostseeheilbad
- Großenbrode – Ostseeheilbad
- Haffkrug, municipality of Scharbeutz – Ostseeheilbad
- Heiligenhafen – Ostseeheilbad
- Kellenhusen – Ostseeheilbad
- Neustadt in Holstein – Ostseebad
- Niendorf, municipality of Timmendorfer Strand – Ostseeheilbad
- Scharbeutz – Ostseeheilbad
- Sierksdorf – Ostseebad
- Timmendorfer Strand – Ostseeheilbad
- Weissenhäuser Strand, municipality of Wangels – Ostseebad

==== Plön ====
- Heikendorf – Ostseebad
- Hohwacht (Ostsee) – Ostseeheilbad
- Laboe – Ostseebad
- Schönberg (Holstein) mit Holm – Ostseebad

==== Rendsburg-Eckernförde ====
- Damp – Ostseebad
- Eckernförde – Ostseebad
- Strande – Ostseebad
- Schönhagen, municipality of Brodersby – Ostseebad

==== Schleswig-Flensburg ====
- Glücksburg – Ostseeheilbad

== North Sea ==
=== Lower Saxony ===
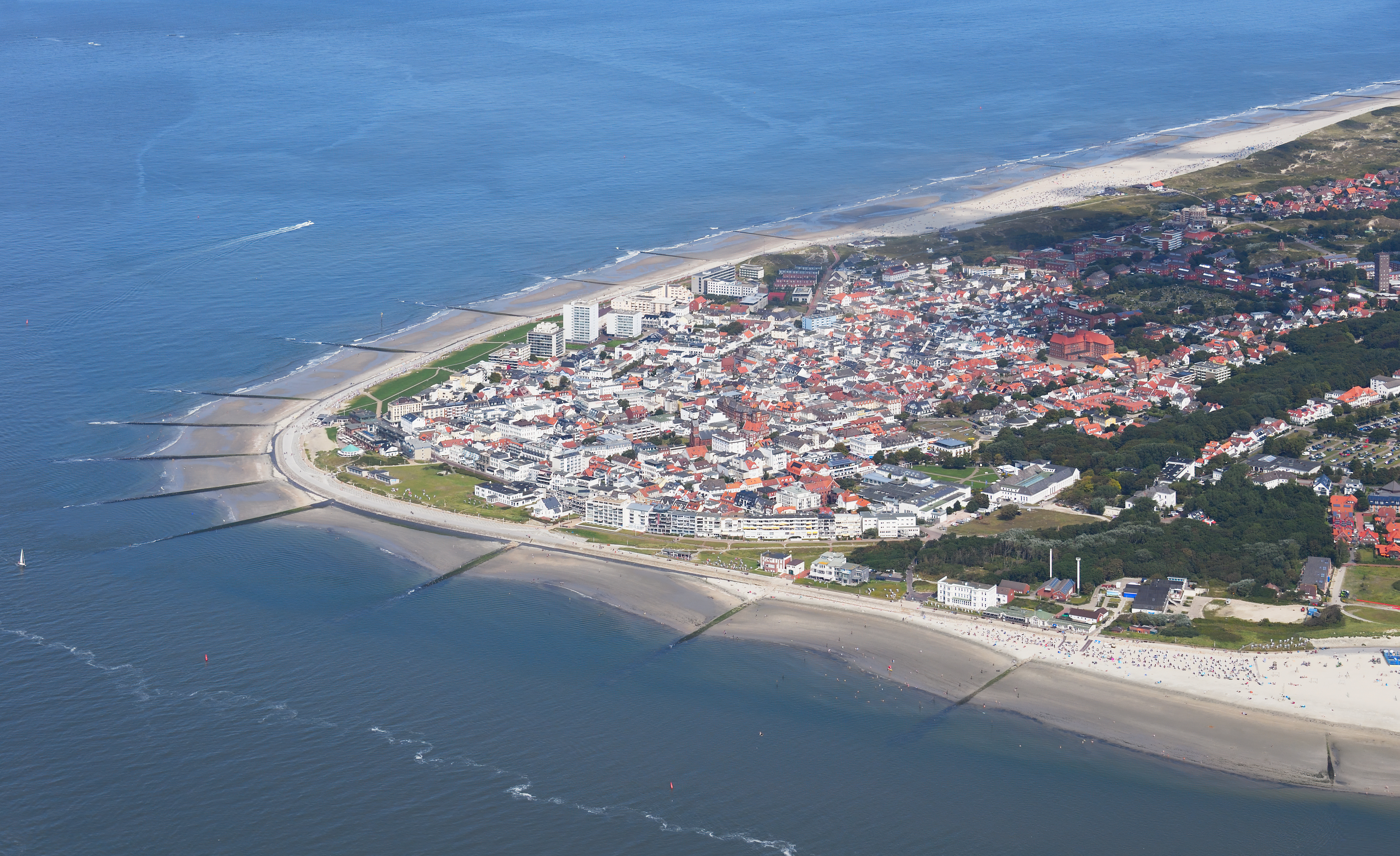
Norderney, first German North Sea resort, founded in 1797 as part of the Kingdom of Prussia.

==== Aurich (East Frisia) ====
- Baltrum - Nordseeheilbad
- Dornumersiel, municipality of Dornum - Nordseebad
- Juist – Nordseeheilbad
- Norddeich, town of Norden – Nordseeheilbad
- Norderney – Nordseeheilbad

==== Cuxhaven (City and district) ====
- Cuxhaven, city - Nordseeheilbad
- Duhnen, city of Cuxhaven
- Otterndorf, Samtgemeinde Land Hadeln - Nordseebad
- Wremen, Samtgemeinde Land Wursten - Nordseebad

==== Friesland (Frisia) ====
- Dangast, town of Varel - Nordseebad, Heilquellen-Kurbetrieb
- Horumersiel-Schillig, municipality of Wangerland – Nordseeheilbad
- Wangerooge – Nordseeheilbad

==== Leer (Ostfriesland) ====
- Borkum – Nordseeheilbad

==== Wesermarsch ====
- Burhave, municipality of Butjadingen – Nordseebad
- Tossens, municipality of Butjadingen – Nordseebad

==== Wittmund (East Frisia) ====
- Bensersiel, Town of Esens – Nordseeheilbad
- Carolinensiel-Harlesiel, town of Wittmund
- Langeoog
- Neuharlingersiel – Nordseeheilbad
- Spiekeroog – Nordseeheilbad

=== Schleswig-Holstein ===
==== Dithmarschen ====
- Friedrichskoog

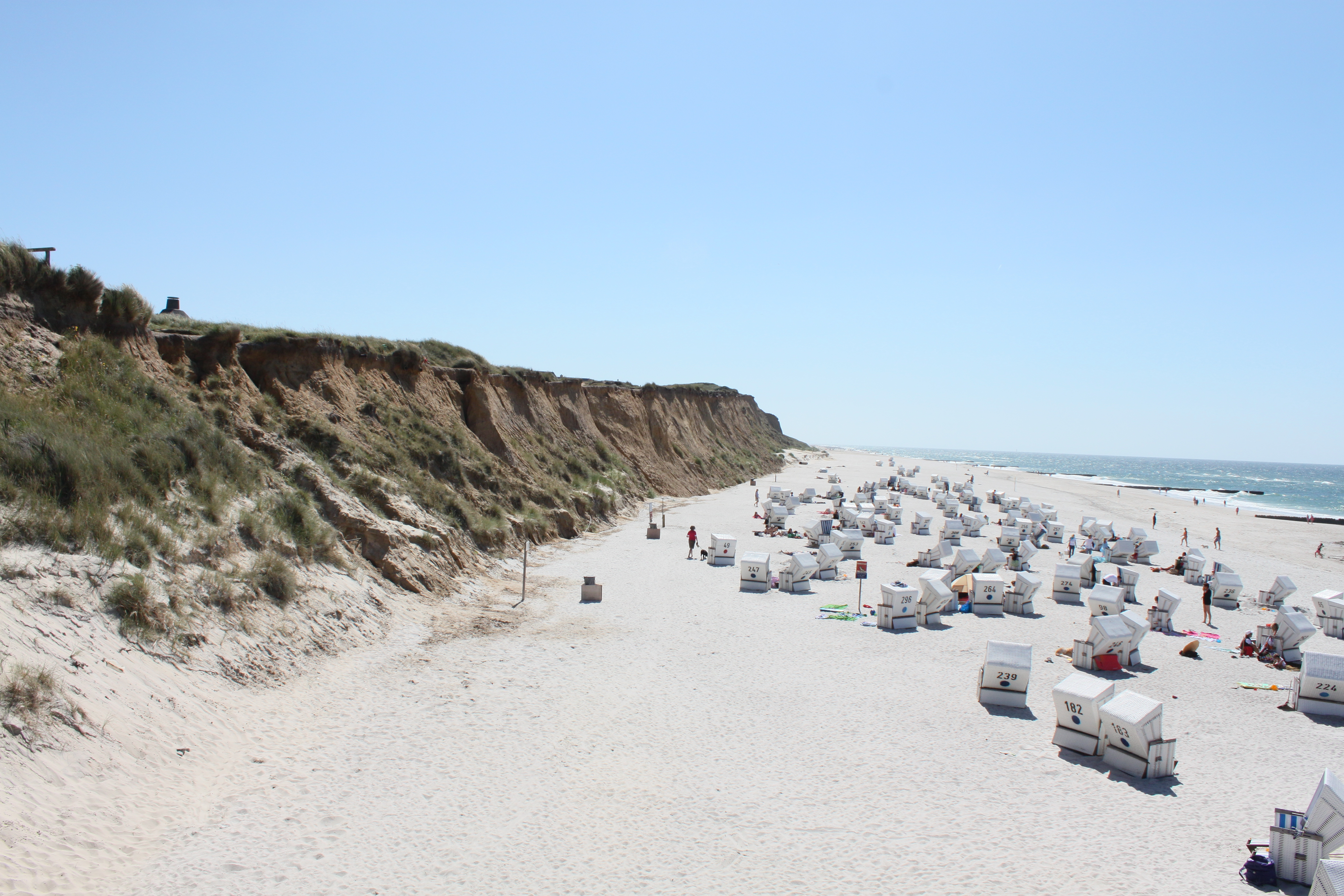
Kampen on Sylt Island

==== Nordfriesland ====
- Amrum with Nebel, Norddorf and Wittdün
- Nieblum
- Nordstrand (Gemeinde)
- Pellworm
- Sankt Peter-Ording - Nordseeheilbad and Schwefelbad
- Utersum
- Wyk auf Föhr

On Sylt Island:

- Hörnum (Sylt), Kreis Nordfriesland, Schleswig-Holstein – Nordseeheilbad
- Kampen (Sylt) - Nordseebad
- List (Sylt) - Seebad
- Rantum (Sylt) - Nordseebad
- Wenningstedt - Nordseebad
- Westerland

==== Pinneberg ====
- Helgoland

== Historical German seaside resorts ==
=== In modern Lithuania ===
- Memel (nowadays called "Klaipėda", with Mellneraggen)
- Nidden ("Nida)
- Polangen ("Palanga")
- Preil ("Neringa")
- Schwarzort ("Juodkrantė")

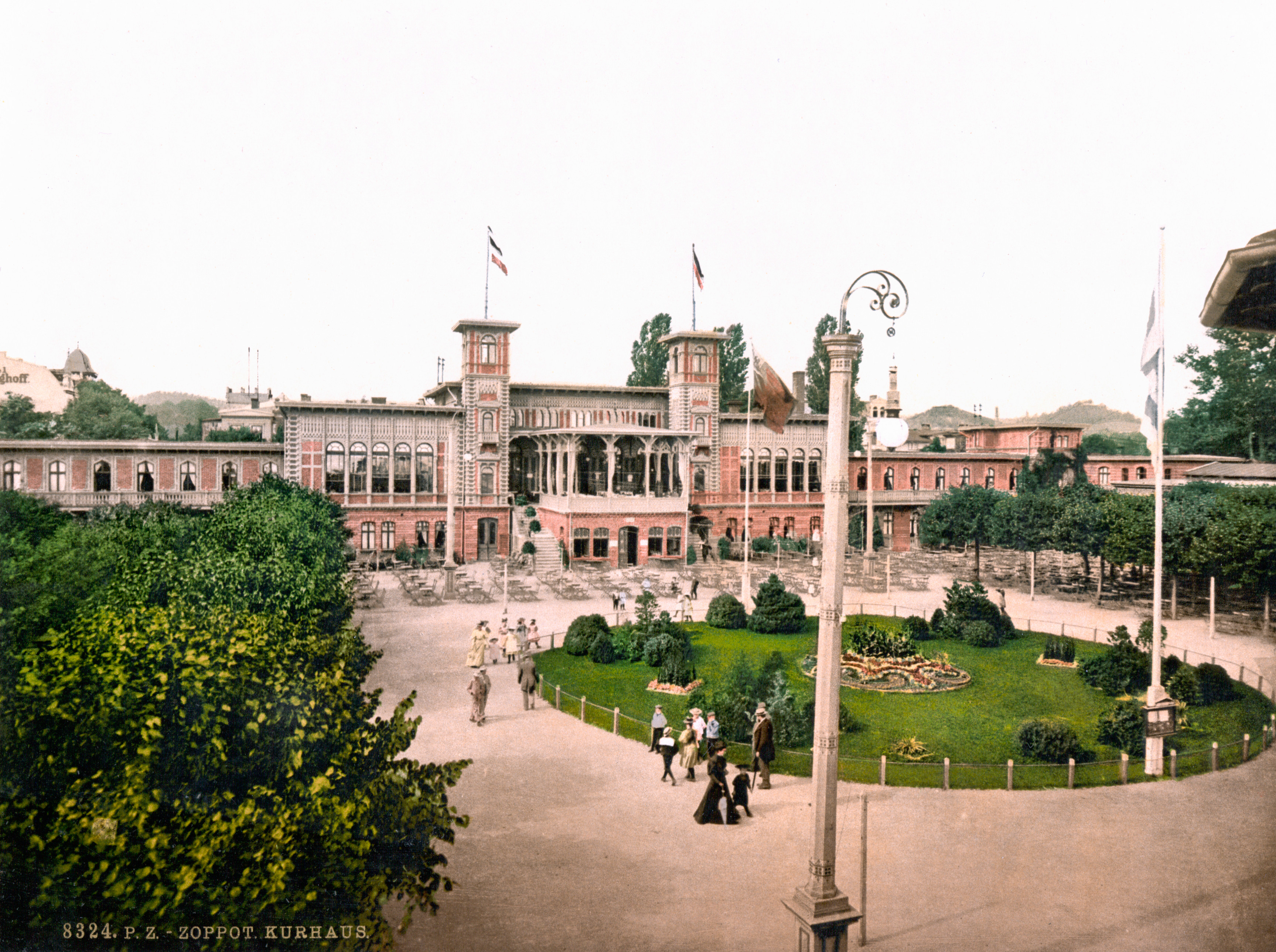
Kurhaus Sopot near Danzig around 1900

=== In modern Poland ===
- Cammin in Pommern ("Kamień Pomorski")
- Dievenow (Dziwnów)
- Henkenhagen ("Ustronie Morskie")
- Kolberg ("Kołobrzeg")
- Misdroy ("Międzyzdroje")
- Stolpmünde ("Ustka")
- Swinemünde ("Świnoujście")
- Zoppot ("Sopot")

=== In modern Russia ===
- Cranz ("Zelenogradsk", with Rosehnen)
- Palmnicken ("Jantarny")
- Rauschen ("Svetlogorsk")
- Rossitten ("Rybachy")

== See also ==
- List of spa towns in Germany
- Tourism in Germany
- Seaside resort
- List of beaches
