= Bansin Pier =

Pier in Bansin, Germany

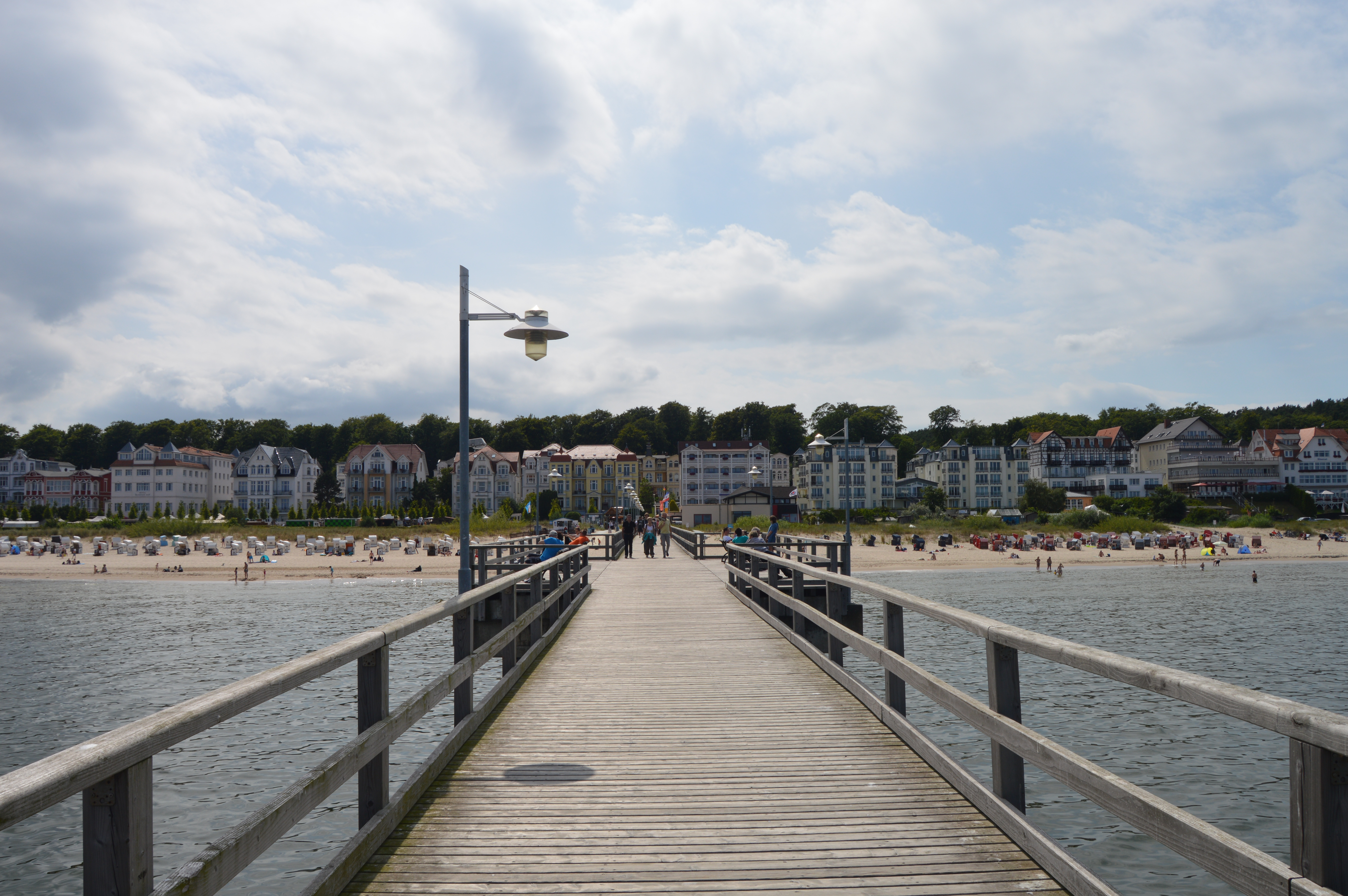
- Ahlbeck Pier
- Type: Pleasure Pier
- Coordinates: 53.5750°N 14.0802°E
- Official name: Seebrücke Ahlbeck

Characteristics
- Total length: 285 metres (935 ft)

History
- Opening date: 1990

Bansin Pier (German: Seebrücke Bansin) – is a pier located in the coastal resort of Bansin, on the island of Usedom; in Germany. The pier stretches out from the Imperial Beach for 285 metres (935 ft) into the Baltic Sea. The pier has a length of 285 meters; 50 meters of which extends over the beach. The original pier existed before World War II, however storms and the poor upkeep of the pier caused the authorities to demolish it. The current pier was built in the second half of 1990.
