= Carola Stern =

German journalist and historian (1925–2006)

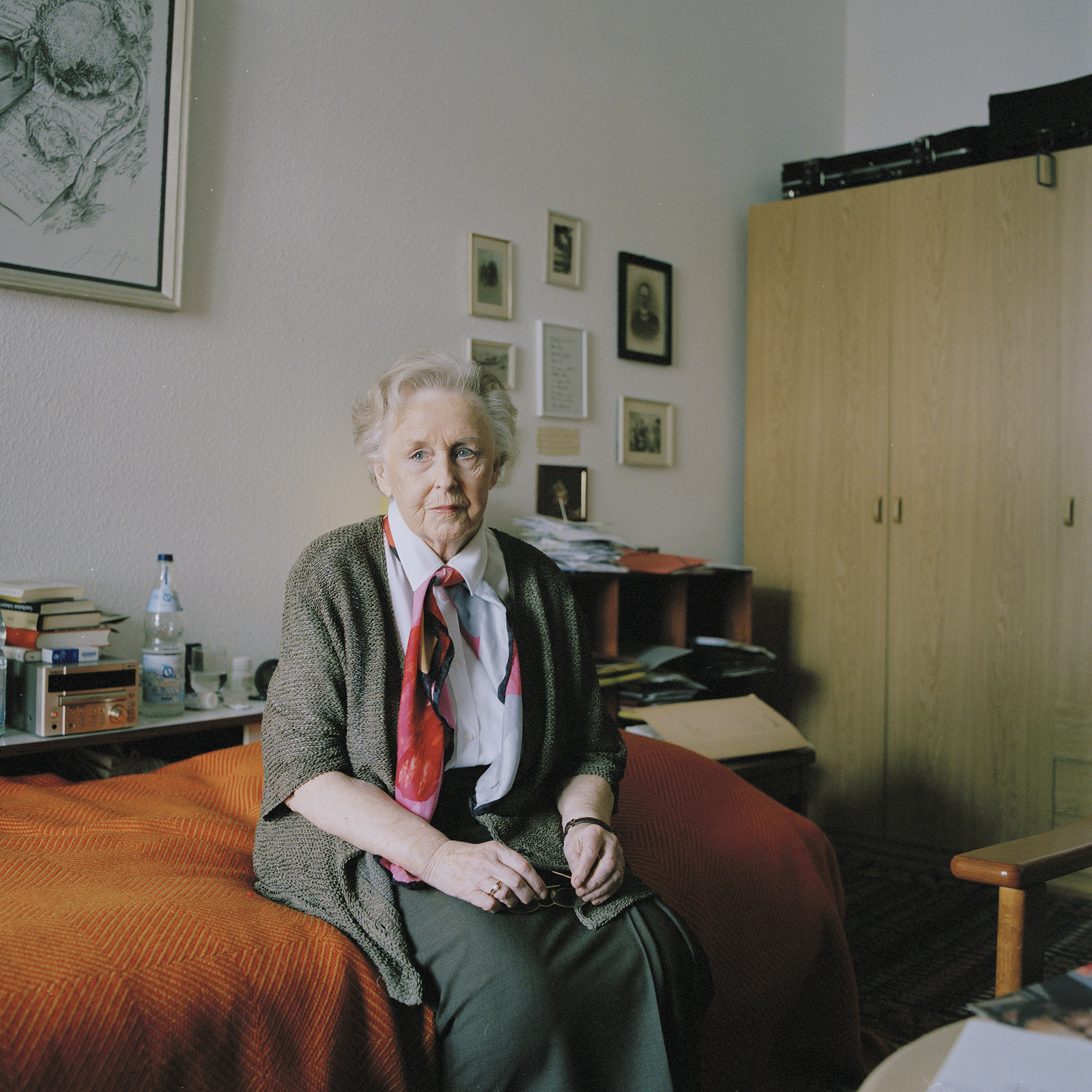
- Carola Stern photographed by Oliver Mark, Berlin 2004
- Born: Erika Assmus; 14 November 1928; Ahlbeck, Island of Usedom, Pomerania, Germany
- Died: 19 January 2006 (aged 77); Berlin, Germany
- Occupations: Spy writer journalist broadcaster
- Spouse: Heinz Zöger (m. 1968; died 2000)

Carola Stern ( 14 November 1925 – 19 January 2006) was the name under which Erika Assmus reinvented herself as a serious journalist and (subsequently) author and politically committed television presenter, after she was obliged to relocate at short notice from East Germany to West Germany in 1951.

She was a co-founder of the German section of the Human Rights organisation, Amnesty International.

She was held in high regard by her fellow writers, and was the vice-president of the energetic German Section of PEN International between 1987 and 1995, after which she became a PEN "Honorary President".

== Biography ==
=== Early years ===
Carola Stern was born at Ahlbeck on the Baltic Island of Usedom, at that time wholly in Germany, on 14 November 1925. Her father, a civil servant, died before she was born. Her widowed mother ran a guest house.

During the Nazi years she was a group leader in the League of German Girls (BDM/"Bund Deutscher Mädel"), membership of which, as sources are quick to point out, was almost universal among girls in small-town Germany at the time. She herself was later hugely self-critical of her "stupid conformity" ("bescheuerte Gläubigkeit") when writing her autobiographical book "In the Nets of Memory" ("In den Netzen der Erinnerung") (1986) as she grew up in the 1930s, while also savagely lamenting the failure of contemporaries to recall their own conformity with the pervasive themes of Nazi Germany.

She successfully completed her schooling in 1944. The end of the war was a disaster for her mother, a committed adherent of National Socialism, but Erika was by now critical of the politicians' slogans exhorting the people to hold out as the end approached.

As World War II ended she joined the general flight towards the west. Between September 1945 and January 1947 she worked as a librarian at the Rabe Missile Research Institute in Bleicherode, a small town in Thuringia where the Soviets had gathered together rocket specialists from the former Peenemünde Army Research Center, which had itself been destroyed and evacuated when the German military had begun to contemplate the possibility of defeat.

=== Espionage, discovery and flight ===
In 1947 she found herself sought out by a "certain Mr Becker" who was interested in the Rabe Institute and offered to get hold of cancer drugs for her mother who was hospitalized in Berlin. She was recruited as an agent by the Counterintelligence Corps of the U.S. Army (CIC), which mandated her to infiltrate the Free German Youth (FDJ /"Freie Deutsche Jugend"), which was effectively at this time a Communist youth organisation.

She later joined East Germany's ruling SED (Socialist Unity Party of Germany)/Sozialistische Einheitspartei Deutschlands) and accepted a job as a lecturer at the party's prestigious Karl Marx Academy (Parteihochschule Karl Marx), which at that time was accommodated in the Hakeburg, a domineering former manor house in Kleinmachnow, a suburb on the south-western fringes of Berlin. Her spying activities for the CIC were discovered by a girl friend and reported to the East German authorities. Assmus faced an interrogation by the Party Control Commission at The academy after which, on 21 June 1951, she fled to West Berlin.

=== In The West as a student and a writer ===
Between 1951 and 1959 she became a student, studying Politics at what was then a stand-alone institution, the German Academy for Politics (Deutsche Hochschule für Politik) and at the Free University of Berlin. During these years she was subjected to two attempted kidnappings by agents from the infamous East German Ministry for State Security (Ministerium für Staatssicherheit / MfS / Stasi).

She also embarked on a career as a writer, initially working as a journalist. She wrote numerous pieces about the German Democratic Republic (East Germany), its ruling SED (Party) and the members of its new ruling class. Initially, for her own protection, her work was published anonymously, identified only by a line of three asterisks/stars. Later she wrote under the pseudonym Carola Stern, a name which frequently led her readers to believe, wrongly, that she was Jewish. The German word "Stern" translates into English as "Star", and is therefore believed to have referred to the little asterisks/stars used to conceal her identity for her earlier published pieces.

=== A broadening literary and public career ===
Quotation

"When I look back over my life, and think about the many things I have done, I always say: the smartest thing I did in my life was to found Amnesty International in the Federal Republic"

Carola Stern

"Wenn ich auf mein Leben zurückblicke und denke, was ich alles gemacht habe, sage ich immer: Das Vernünftigste, was ich in meinem Leben getan habe, war amnesty international in der Bundesrepublik zu gründen."

Carola Stern

She worked as an editor with the Cologne publishing house Kiepenheuer & Witsch between 1960 and 1970, also continuing to write extensively in her own right. Her work was unashamedly political and she wrote from social-democratic perspective, focusing on matters such as human rights, women's and domestic issues, while at the same time continuing to write extensively as an expert on the inner workings of the "GDR" (die "DDR").

In 1961 Carola Stern was one of three people, together with Gerd Ruge and Felix Rexhausen, who founded the German section of Amnesty International, herself taking on the chairmanship. She was supported by a future West German President, the (by now SPD politician Gustav Heinemann and his wife Hilda, as well as the theologian Helmut Gollwitzer and his wife Brigitte.

Between 1970 and 1985 she became a radio editor and gained prominence as a regular commentator on German National Television (much of which was and is also based in Cologne). Even before this she was an energetic public advocate of détente between the two Germanies.

=== Advocacy of human rights and freedoms ===
A letter appeared in West Germany's popular news magazine Stern on 6 June 1971 under the self-explanatory headline "We had an abortion!" ("Wir haben abgetrieben!"). The letter was organised by the feminist campaigner Alice Schwarzer and signed by 374 women including Carola Stern. At the time abortion was, and till 1992 remained under most circumstances, criminalized in West Germany. Stern's regular television appearances made her a particularly high-profile signatory of the abortion letter, and the West German Broadcasting operation (Westdeutscher Rundfunk) was deluged with complaints about the "political whore" ("Polit-Nutte").

From 1976 she became a co-producer, together with Heinrich Böll and Günter Grass, of a journal called "L '76" (and renamed "L '80" four years later) which, among other things, offered a platform for Czech dissident writers who had been obliged to leave Czechoslovakia after that country underwent a Soviet invasion in August 1968. She continued to head up and participate in political features and discussions on National Television. In 1978, working this time with Erhard Eppler und Johannes Rau, and taking inspiration from the life of the recently deceased Gustav Heinemann (1899–1976), she established the "Gustav Heinemann Initiative for Human Rights and Peace" / GHI ("Gustav Heinemann-Initiative für Menschenrechte und Frieden").

=== Later years ===
Carola Stern retired from television in 1985 but continued writing books, and she retained the campaigning habit. In 2000, with Hartmut von Hentig and Günter Grass, she signed a demand that compensation should not be further delayed for victims of the Nazi forced labour policies.

== Personal ==
Carola Stern: Recognition
- 1970 Jakob Kaiser Prize (broadcasting/reportage)
- 1972 Carl von Ossietzky Medal (peace and human rights)
- 1988 Nordrhein-Westfalen Prize (cultural, scientific or general)
- 1994 Hermann Kesten Prize (literary prize for support of persecuted authors)
- 1995 Hermann Sinsheimer Prize (literature)
- 1998 Roswitha Prize (literature – women only)
- 1998 Louise Schroeder Medal (peace, democracy, social justice)
- 2001 Order of Merit of the Federal Republic of Germany

Carola Stern married the television journalist Heinz Zöger in 1968. As a former Communist Zöger had suffered persecution during the Nazi period. His advocacy of reforms as an influential journalist in East Germany during the late 1950s had nevertheless left him arrested there as an enemy of the (Communist) state, and in 1959 he had fled to West Germany.

Zöger was originally from Leipzig, but their remains are buried together in Usedom, the island where she was born.

== In memoriam ==
In the coastal resort of Bansin on the Island of Usedom some of Stern's belongings are on display at the Hans Werner Richter House. The local council of her own birthplace nearby, Ahlbeck, had already, while she was still alive, rejected the idea of setting up a memorial to her.

On 28 January 2008, the German section of PEN International announced the creation of the Darmstadt based Carola Stern Foundation. Objectives of the foundation are to support threatened and persecuted writers along with their families, and to facilitate their integration in Germany.

== Publications ==
- 1954: Die SED. – Handbuch über den Aufbau, die Organisation und Funktion des Parteiapparats der SED.
- 1957: Porträt einer bolschewistischen Partei. – Entwicklung, Funktion und Situation der SED. Wie konnte die SED alle anderen gesellschaftlich relevanten Gruppen aus der Macht verdrängen?
- 1964: Ulbricht. Eine politische Biographie. – Darstellung der Frühgeschichte der SED.
- 1971: Lexikon zur Geschichte und Politik im 20. Jahrhundert – as co-producer
- 1975: Willy Brandt. rororo Monographien Nr. 50.232, ISBN 3-499-50232-1.
- 1979: Zwei Christen in der Politik – Gustav Heinemann und Helmut Gollwitzer. – Gustav Heinemann gewidmet.
- 1979: Wendepunkte der deutschen Geschichte. – produced together with Heinrich A. Winkler.
- 1980: Strategien für die Menschenrechte.
- 1981: amnesty international – Wer schweigt, wird mitschuldig. – als Herausgeberin.
- 1986: Isadora Duncan und Sergej Jessenin. Der Dichter und die Tänzerin. – rororo Taschenbücher Nr. 22.531, ISBN 3-499-22531-X.
- 1986: In den Netzen der Erinnerung. Lebensgeschichten zweier Menschen. – rororo Taschenbücher Nr. 12.227, ISBN 3-499-12227-8.
- 1990: "Ich möchte mir Flügel wünschen." Das Leben der Dorothea Schlegel. rororo Taschenbücher Nr. 13.368, ISBN 3-499-13368-7.
- 1994: Der Text meines Herzens. Das Leben der Rahel Varnhagen. – rororo Taschenbücher Nr. 13.901, ISBN 3-499-13901-4.
- 1998: Die Sache, die man Liebe nennt. Das Leben der Fritzi Massary. – 2000: rororo Taschenbücher Nr. 22.529, ISBN 3-499-22529-8.
- 2000: Männer lieben anders. Helene Weigel und Bertolt Brecht. – Rowohlt, Berlin, ISBN 3-87134-411-7.
- 2001: Doppelleben. – Autobiografie, Kiepenheuer & Witsch, Köln, ISBN 3-46202981-9.
- 2003: Alles, was ich in der Welt verlange. Das Leben der Johanna Schopenhauer. – Kiepenheuer & Witsch, Köln, ISBN 3-462-03319-0.
- 2004: "Uns wirft nichts mehr um." Eine Lebensreise, aufgezeichnet von Thomas Schadt. – Rowohlt, Reinbek, ISBN 3-498-06380-4.
- 2005: Eine Erdbeere für Hitler: Deutschland unterm Hakenkreuz. – Book for young people written together with Ingke Brodersen.
- 2005: Auf den Wassern des Lebens. – Doppelbiographie von Gustaf Gründgens und Marianne Hoppe. Verlag Kiepenheuer und Witsch, Köln, 19.90Euro, 400 Seiten; ISBN 3-462-03604-1.
- 2006: Kommen Sie, Cohn! – zusammen mit Ingke Brodersen, Verlag Kiepenheuer und Witsch, Köln, 16.90Euro, 192 pages. Doppelbiographie und deutsch-jüdische Familiengeschichte des Verlegers Friedrich Cohn und der Schriftstellerin Clara Viebig. Her last book, which appeared posthumously ISBN 3-462-03724-2.

== Some memberships ==
- 1961–1970 Deputy chair then chair of the Federal Republic of Germany's section of Amnesty International.
- 1970–1972 International Executive Committee of Amnesty International.
- from 1972 Member of PEN International: West German Section.
- 1987–1995 Vice-president PEN International, German Section.
- from 1995 Honorary president PEN International, German Section.
- from 1997 Patron of the newly established Berlin based de:Varnhagen GesellschaftVarnhagen Society
- Advisory board member Against forgetting – For democracy (Gegen Vergessen – Für Demokratie)
- Member Social Democratic Party of Germany (SPD / Sozialdemokratische Partei Deutschlands)
- Former member Socialist Unity Party of Germany (SED /Sozialistische Einheitspartei Deutschlands)
