= Vineta Festival =

The Vineta Festival (German: Vineta-Festspiele) is an annual theatre festival in Germany which began in 1997. The festival takes its name from Vineta, a mythical city said to have been on the southern Baltic Sea located on the island of Usedom. The city is said to have been seen rising from the sea on the beach of Koserow by a young shepherd one Easter morning. A troupe of actors, many of them students at the Theatre Academy of Zinnowitz, participate in the yearly festival.

The performances incorporate theatre with dance, modern music and laser light shows and are given on the beach at Zinnowitz.

The 2015 festival started on 19 June under the artistic directorship of Wolfgang Bordel and the musical directorship of Wolfgang Schmiedt. The opening show attracted approximately 20,000 spectators despite intermittent heavy rain.
