= Schloonsee =

Lake in Germany

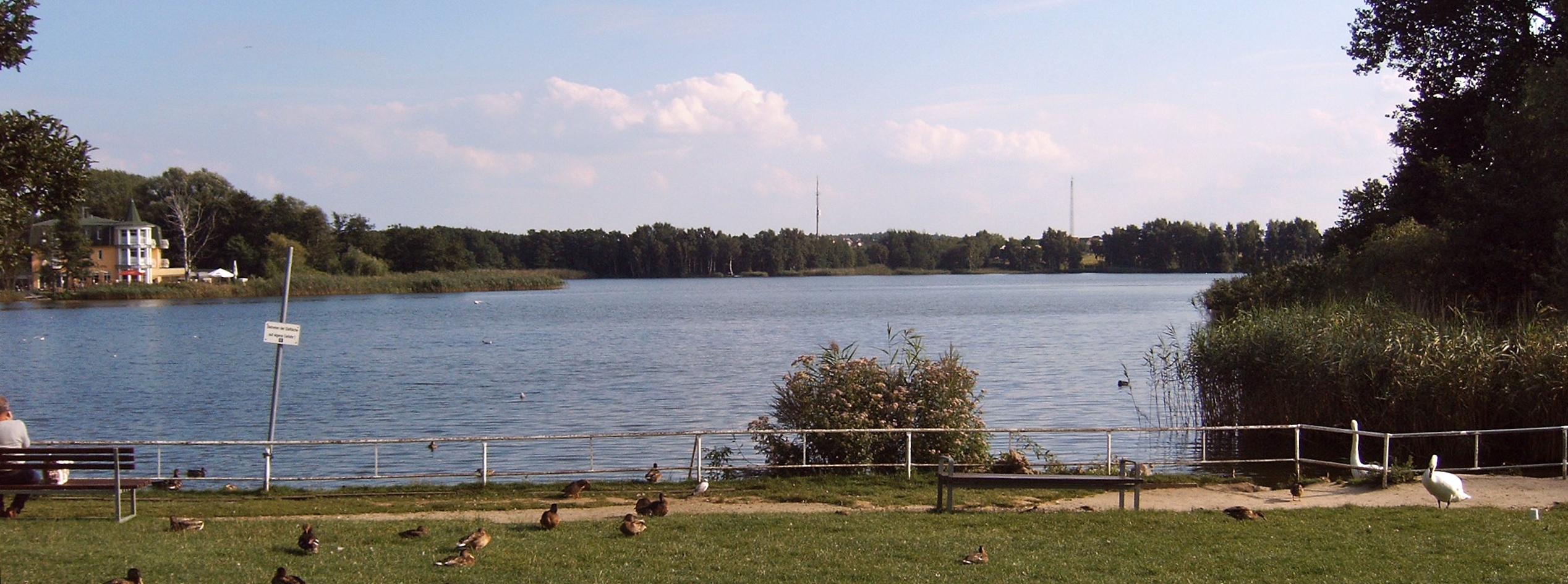
- Schloonsee, seen from Waldstraße in Bansin

- Location within Mecklenburg-Vorpommern
- Location: Mecklenburg-Vorpommern
- Coordinates: 53°57′59.90172″N 14°8′45.02975″E
- Basin countries: Germany
- Surface area: 0.14 km^{2} (0.054 sq mi)
- Average depth: 3.0 m (9.8 ft)
- Surface elevation: 0 m (0 ft)

Schloonsee is a lake in Mecklenburg-Vorpommern, Germany. It belongs to Bansin on Usedom island. At an elevation of 0 m, its surface area is 0.14 km².
