= Observation Tower Ahlbeck =

Coordinates: 53°56′43.5″N 14°10′40.2″E

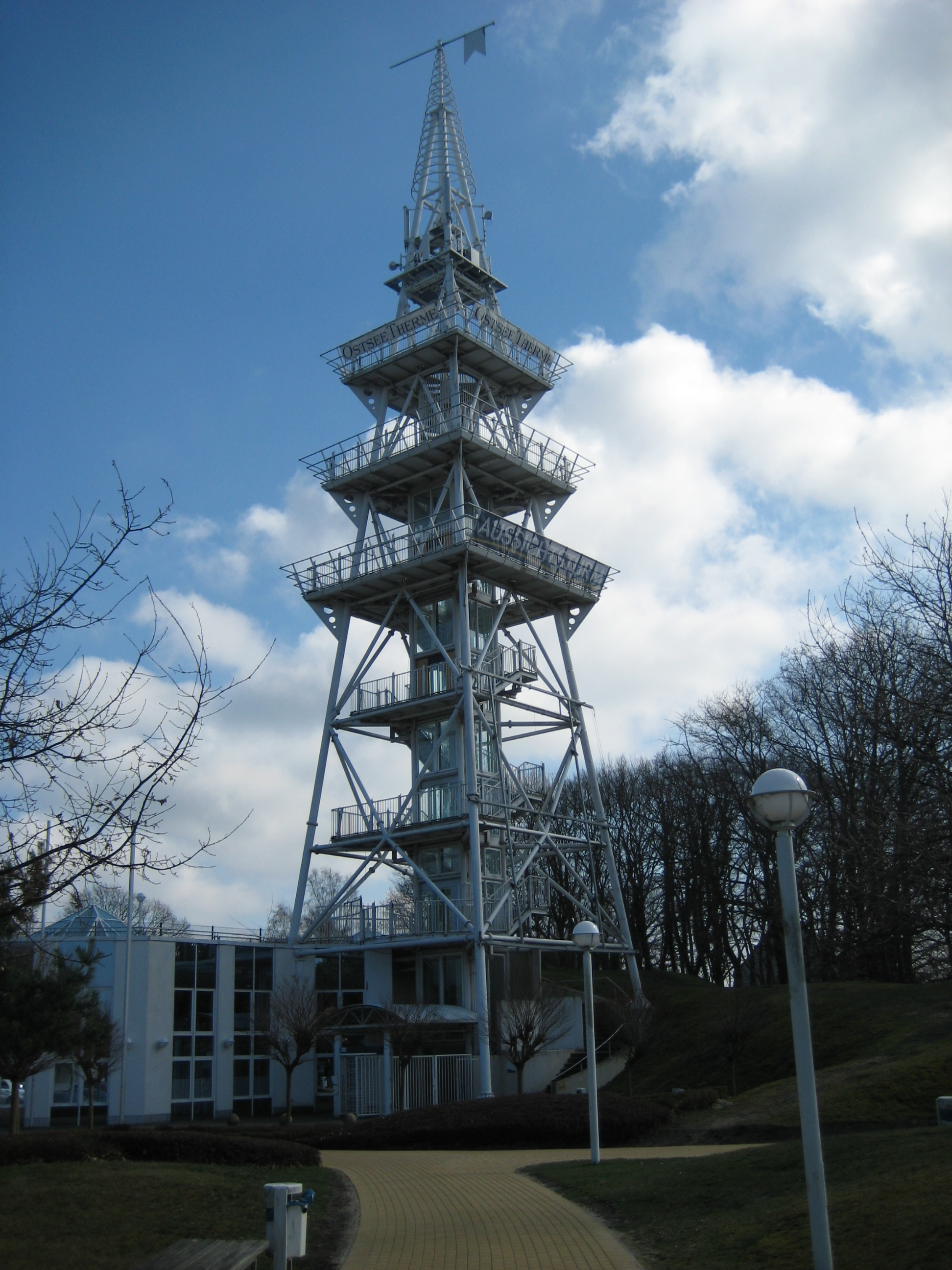
Observation tower in Ahlbeck, Mecklenburg-Vorpommern, Germany

The Observation Tower Ahlbeck is a 50-metre-tall (160 ft) observation tower with three observation decks, at Ahlbeck on the island of Usedom in Germany. The structure is a steel framework tower. There is a fourth platform above the observation platforms on which aerials for mobile phone services are located.

== See also ==
- List of towers
