= Zinnowitz =

- Municipality
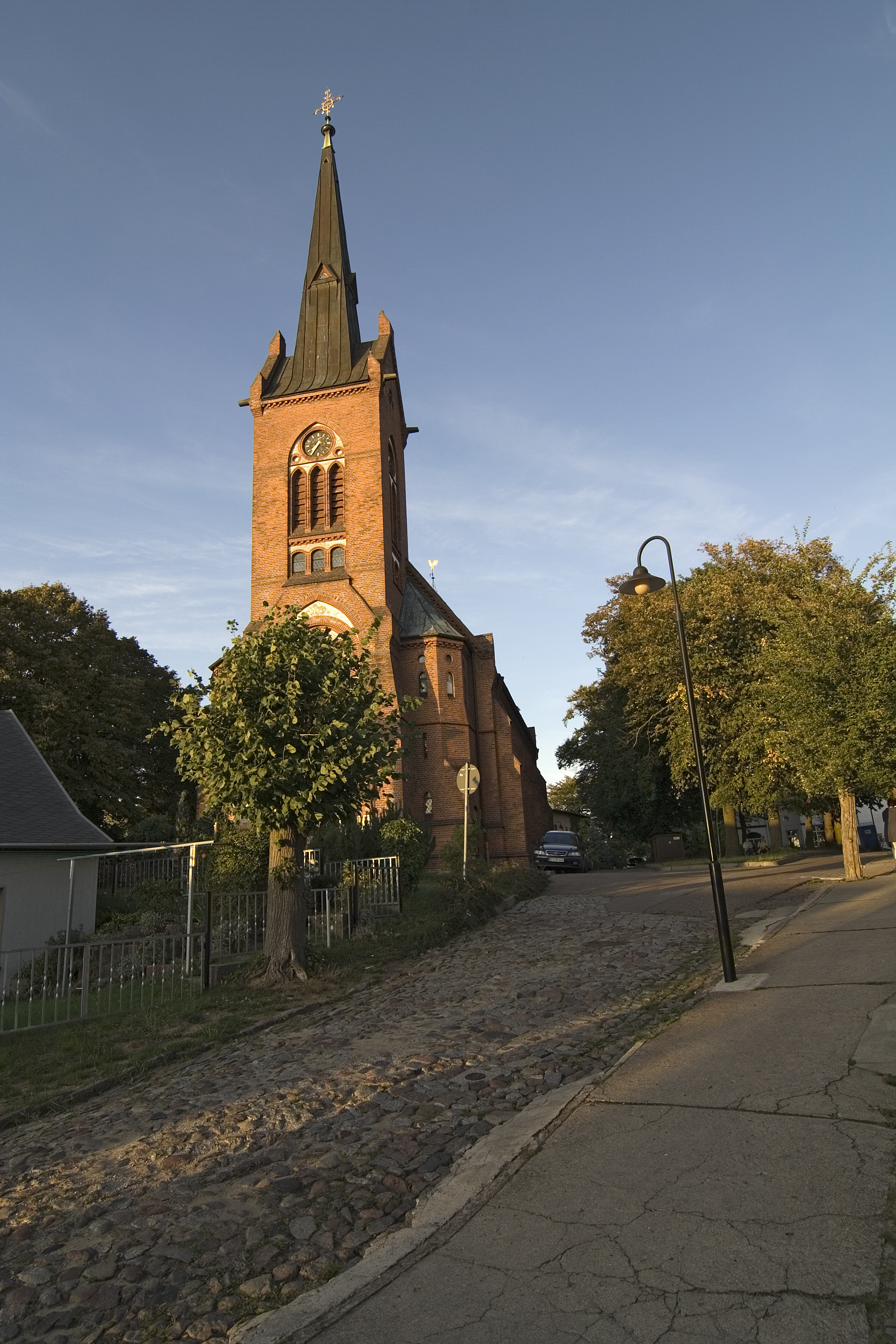
- Protestant Church

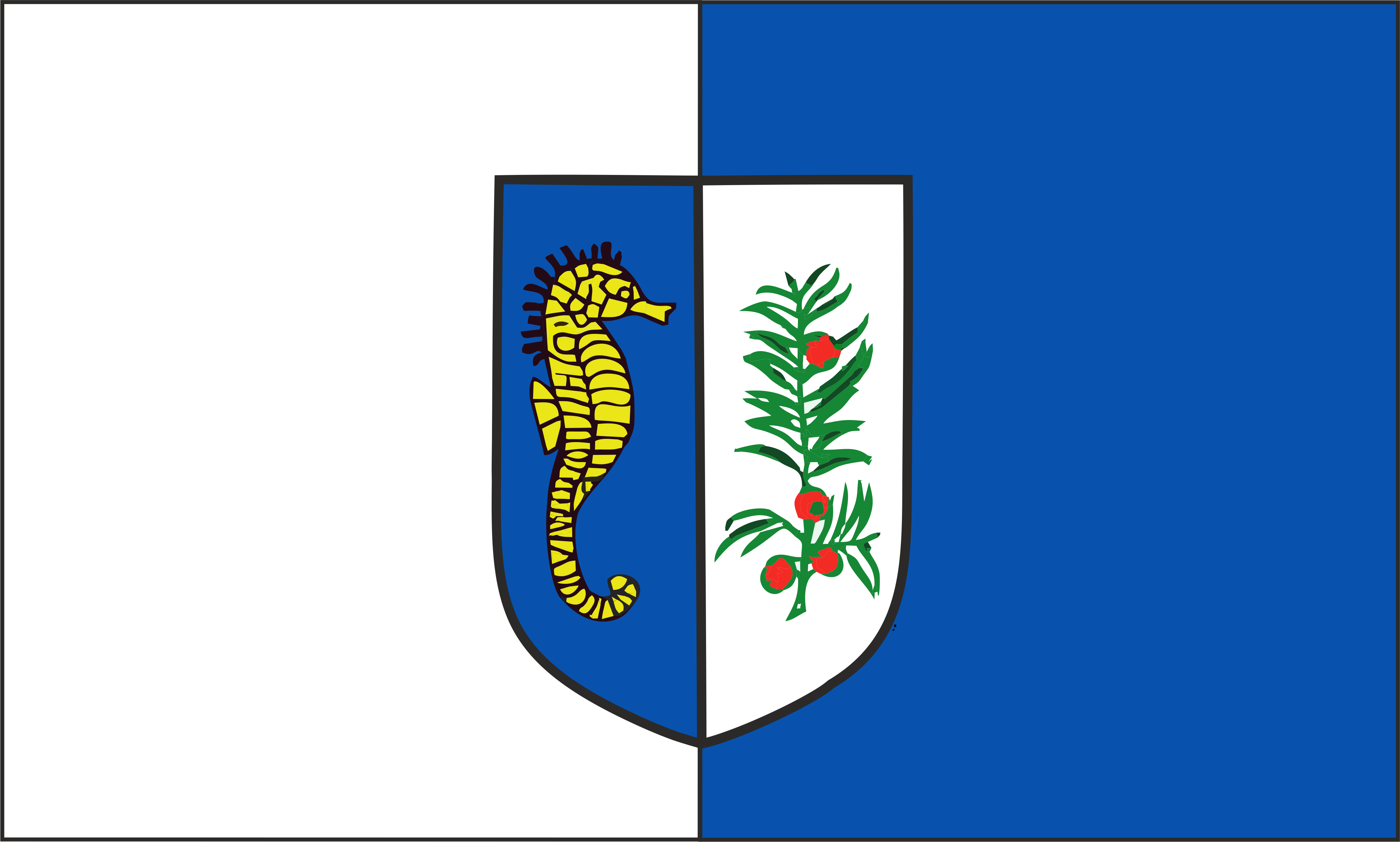
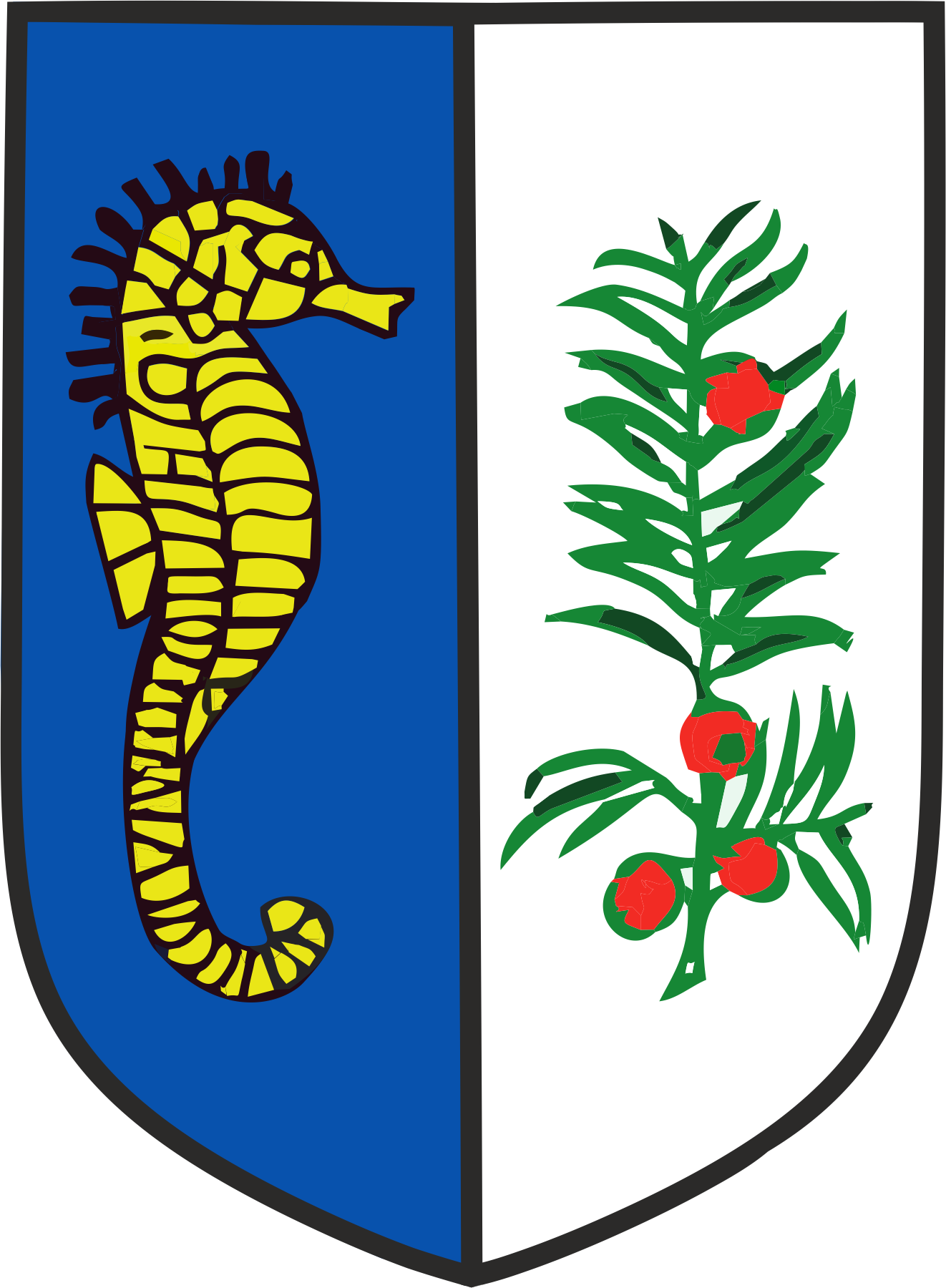
- Flag Coat of arms

- Location of Zinnowitz within Vorpommern-Greifswald district
- Interactive map of Zinnowitz
- Location within Germany Location within Mecklenburg-Vorpommern
- Coordinates: 54°04′35″N 13°54′41″E
- Country: Germany
- State: Mecklenburg-Vorpommern
- District: Vorpommern-Greifswald
- Municipal assoc.: Usedom-Nord

Government
  - Mayor: Carsten Michalk

Area
  - Total: 9.04 km^{2} (3.49 sq mi)
- Elevation: 5 m (16 ft)

Population (2025-12-31)
  - Total: 4,114
  - Density: 455/km^{2} (1,180/sq mi)
- Time zone: UTC+01:00 (CET)
  - Summer (DST): UTC+02:00 (CEST)
- Postal codes: 17454
- Dialling codes: 038377
- Vehicle registration: VG
- Website: www.zinnowitz.de

Zinnowitz is a semi-urban Spa (resort) municipality in Mecklenburg-Vorpommern on the northern German island of Usedom on the Baltic Sea. The municipality has rail connections to Wolgast and Ahlbeck.

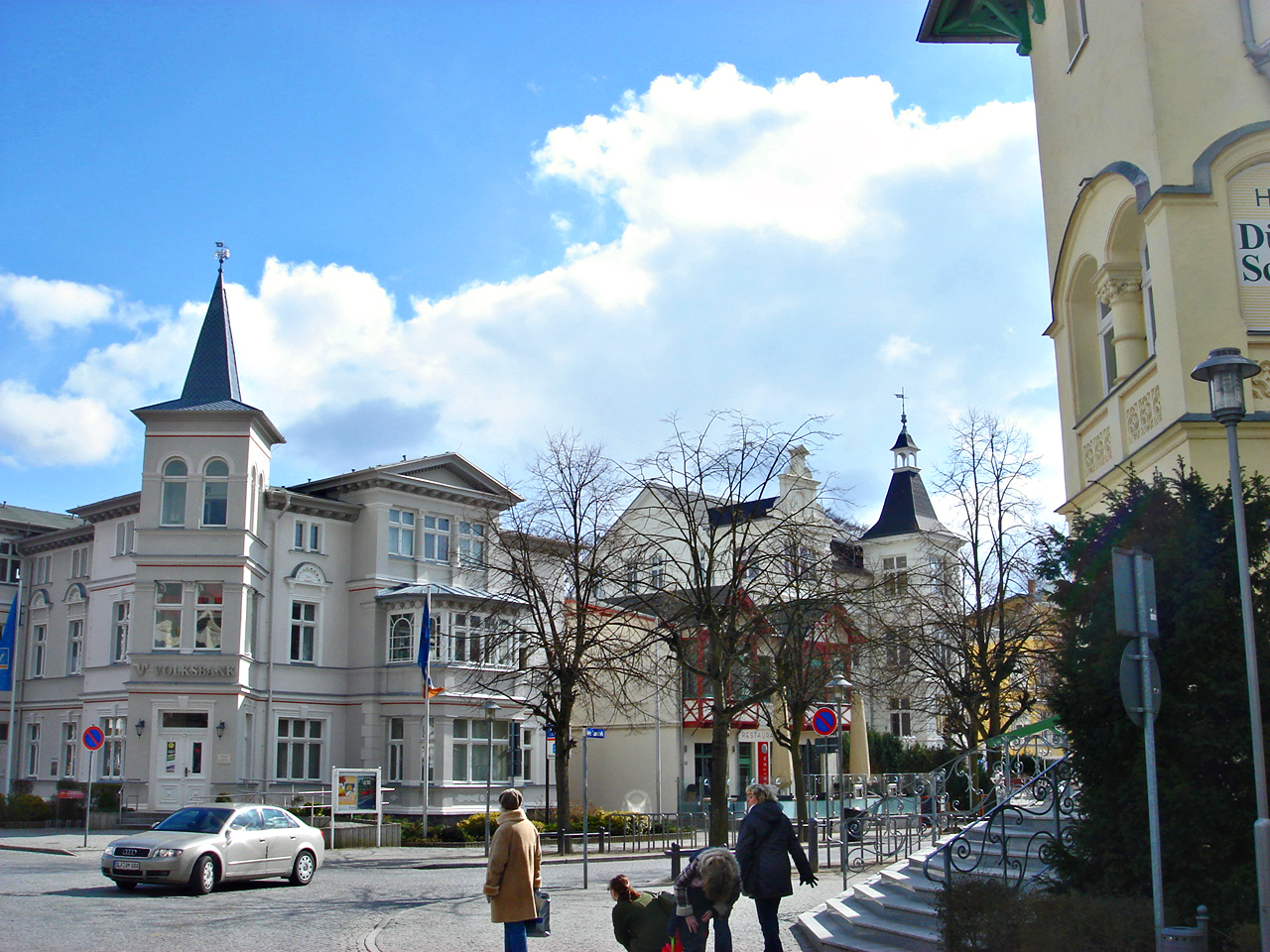
Resort hotels in the Bäderarchitektur style in Zinnowitz (Neue Strandstraße)

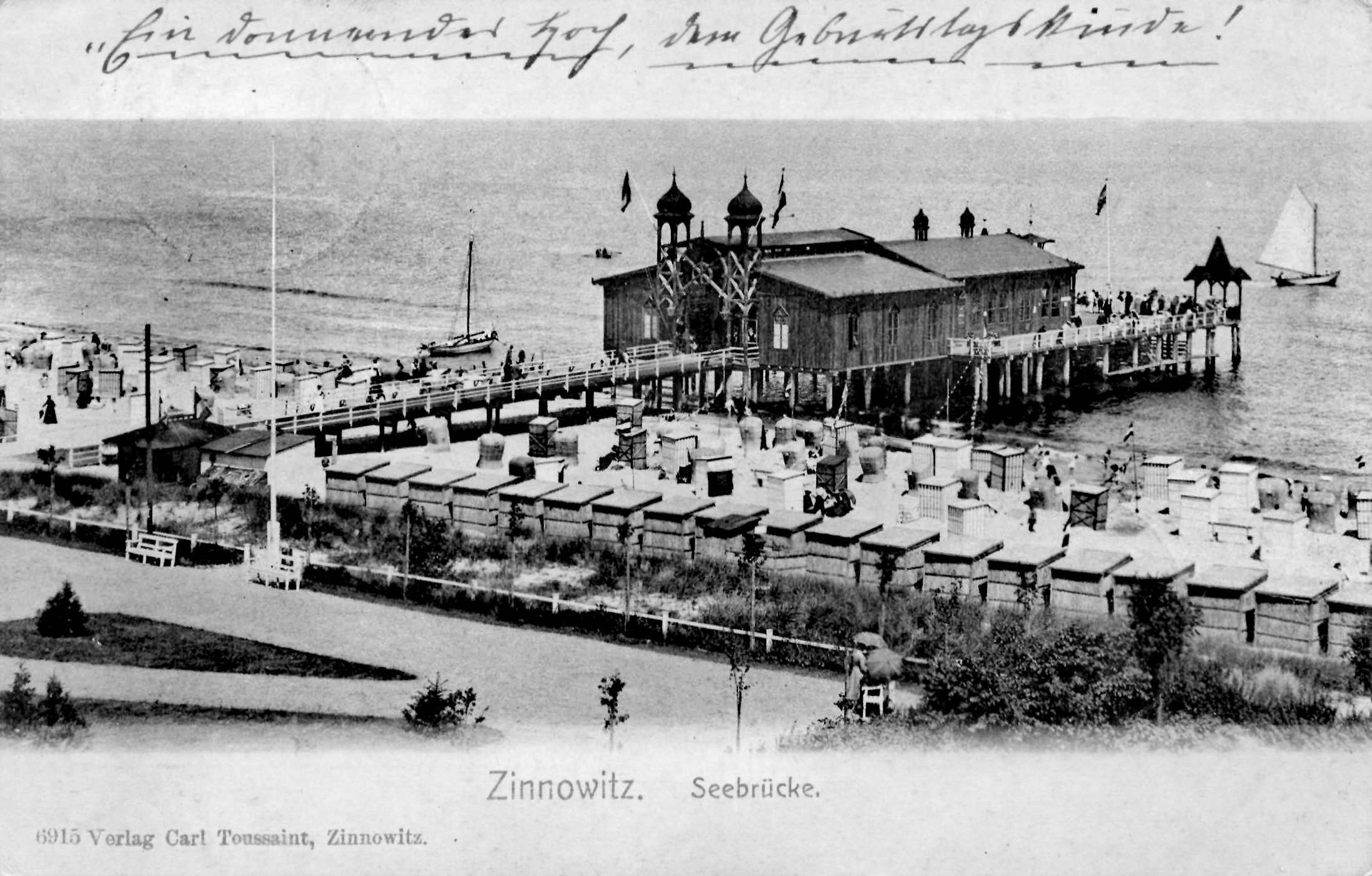
The historic pier of Zinnowitz, 1906

== Climate ==
Zinnowitz has an oceanic climate that is moderated by the Baltic Sea. Extreme temperatures are rare. The municipality has repeatedly scored the highest amount of sunshine in Germany.

Climate data for Zinnowitz, 1985-2015 normals
Month	Jan	Feb	Mar	Apr	May	Jun	Jul	Aug	Sep	Oct	Nov	Dec	Year
Record high °C (°F)	13.7 (56.7)	17.7 (63.9)	20.2 (68.4)	26.9 (80.4)	29.4 (84.9)	37.1 (98.8)	33.6 (92.5)	36.5 (97.7)	29.4 (84.9)	23.7 (74.7)	18.7 (65.7)	15.2 (59.4)	37.1 (98.8)
Mean daily maximum °C (°F)	3 (37)	4 (39)	7 (45)	12 (54)	17 (63)	20 (68)	22 (72)	22 (72)	18 (64)	13 (55)	7 (45)	3 (37)	12 (54)
Daily mean °C (°F)	1.0 (33.8)	2.0 (35.6)	4.5 (40.1)	7.0 (44.6)	9.0 (48.2)	17.0 (62.6)	19.0 (66.2)	19.0 (66.2)	15.0 (59.0)	10.5 (50.9)	5.5 (41.9)	1.5 (34.7)	9.3 (48.7)
Mean daily minimum °C (°F)	−1 (30)	0 (32)	2 (36)	6 (43)	10 (50)	14 (57)	16 (61)	16 (61)	12 (54)	8 (46)	4 (39)	0 (32)	7 (45)
Record low °C (°F)	−9.1 (15.6)	−16.1 (3.0)	−15.8 (3.6)	−6.3 (20.7)	−2.5 (27.5)	3.1 (37.6)	4.8 (40.6)	5.2 (41.4)	−0.8 (30.6)	−4.9 (23.2)	−5.3 (22.5)	−13.1 (8.4)	−16.1 (3.0)
Average precipitation mm (inches)	43 (1.7)	38 (1.5)	30 (1.2)	17 (0.7)	33 (1.3)	40 (1.6)	52 (2.0)	45 (1.8)	49 (1.9)	39 (1.5)	38 (1.5)	38 (1.5)	462 (18.2)
Average precipitation days	20	16	13	9	12	10	12	13	13	15	12	17	162
Mean monthly sunshine hours	40	89	151	250	240	271	257	240	172	115	46	33	1,904
Source: timeanddate Deutscher Wetterdienst

== History ==
The settlement of Zinnowitz is first mentioned under the Slavic name Tzys in 1309 in a deed of donation by Bogislaw IV, duke of Pomerania, to the Crumminer monastery. When the monastery was dissolved in 1563, Tzys reverted to Pomerania. At the end of the Thirty Years' War, in 1648, the island of Usedom on which Zinnowitz is situated fell to Sweden, which changed the municipality's name to Zitz.

In the middle of the 18th century, Zitz became part of Prussia. In 1751 the municipality was renamed Zinnowitz. When the Prussian state fell into financial need because of the Napoleonic Wars, it sold Zinnowitz to a businessman, the merchant F. W. Krause of nearby Swinemünde, who in turn sold it in 32 parcels it to a group of colonists. In June 1851 Zinnowitz was designated an official spa.

Josef Alois Kessler, the last Volga German Bishop, retired and died here.

In GDR times, Zinnowitz was the most important bathing resort for Freier Deutscher Gewerkschaftsbund tourism.

Zinnowitz is one of a couple of possible sites for the mythological sunken medieval city of Vineta. The legend is played out during the summer on the resort's open-air stage.

In the forest between Zinnowitz and Zempin, some remnants of the launching pads for testing V1 missiles can still be found. They were used between 1943 and 1945 as part of the nearby Peenemünde rocket testing facilities.

== See also ==
- Vineta Festival
