= Amber Spas =

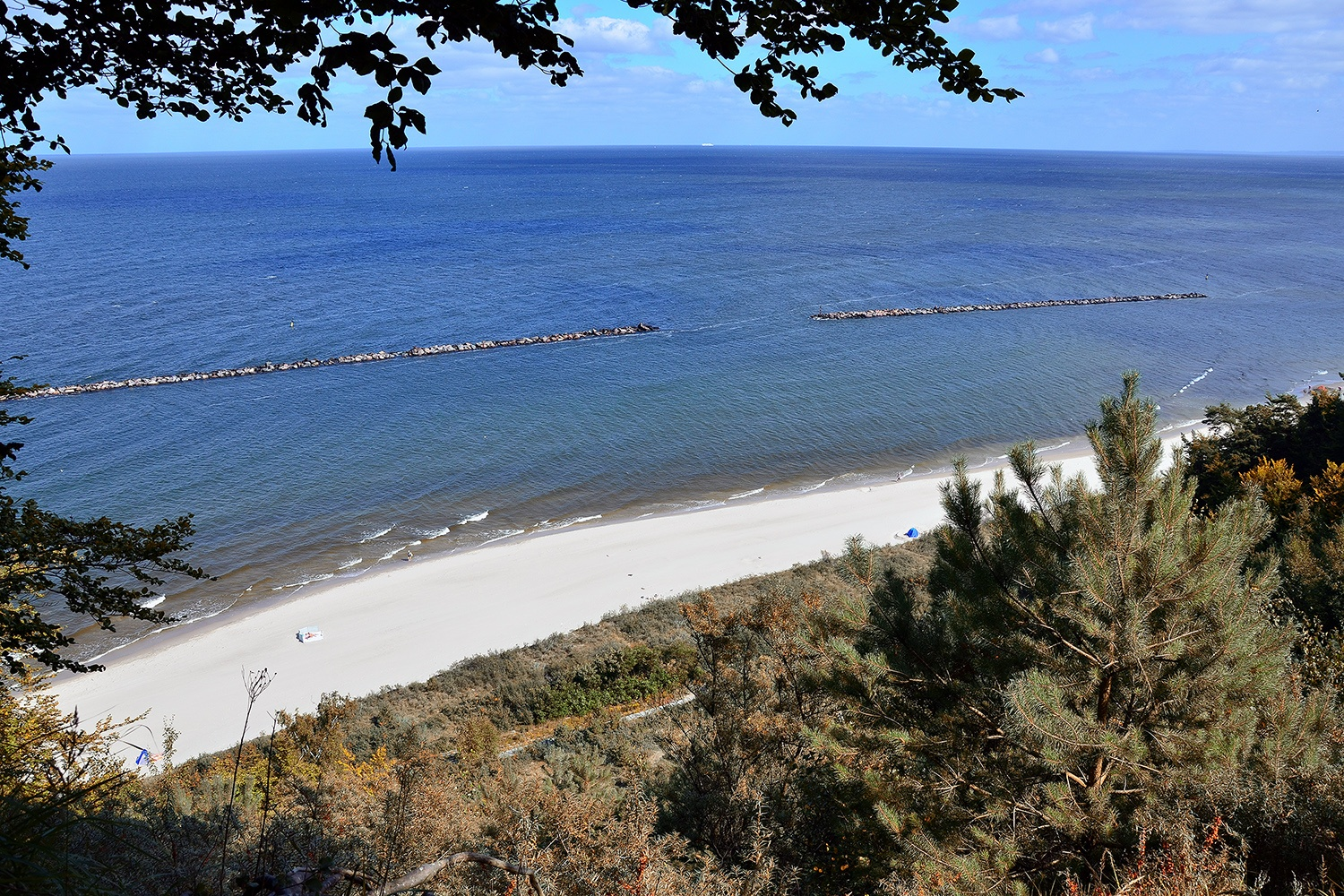
View towards the beach of Koserow, from the steep coast at Streckelsberg.

The Amber Spas (German: Bernsteinbäder) are four German seaside resorts on the island of Usedom, that originally formed an administrative unit called Amt Insel Usedom-Mitte:

- Koserow – Ostseebad
- Loddin – Ostseebad
- Ückeritz – Ostseebad
- Zempin – Ostseebad
