= Resort architecture =

Architectural style

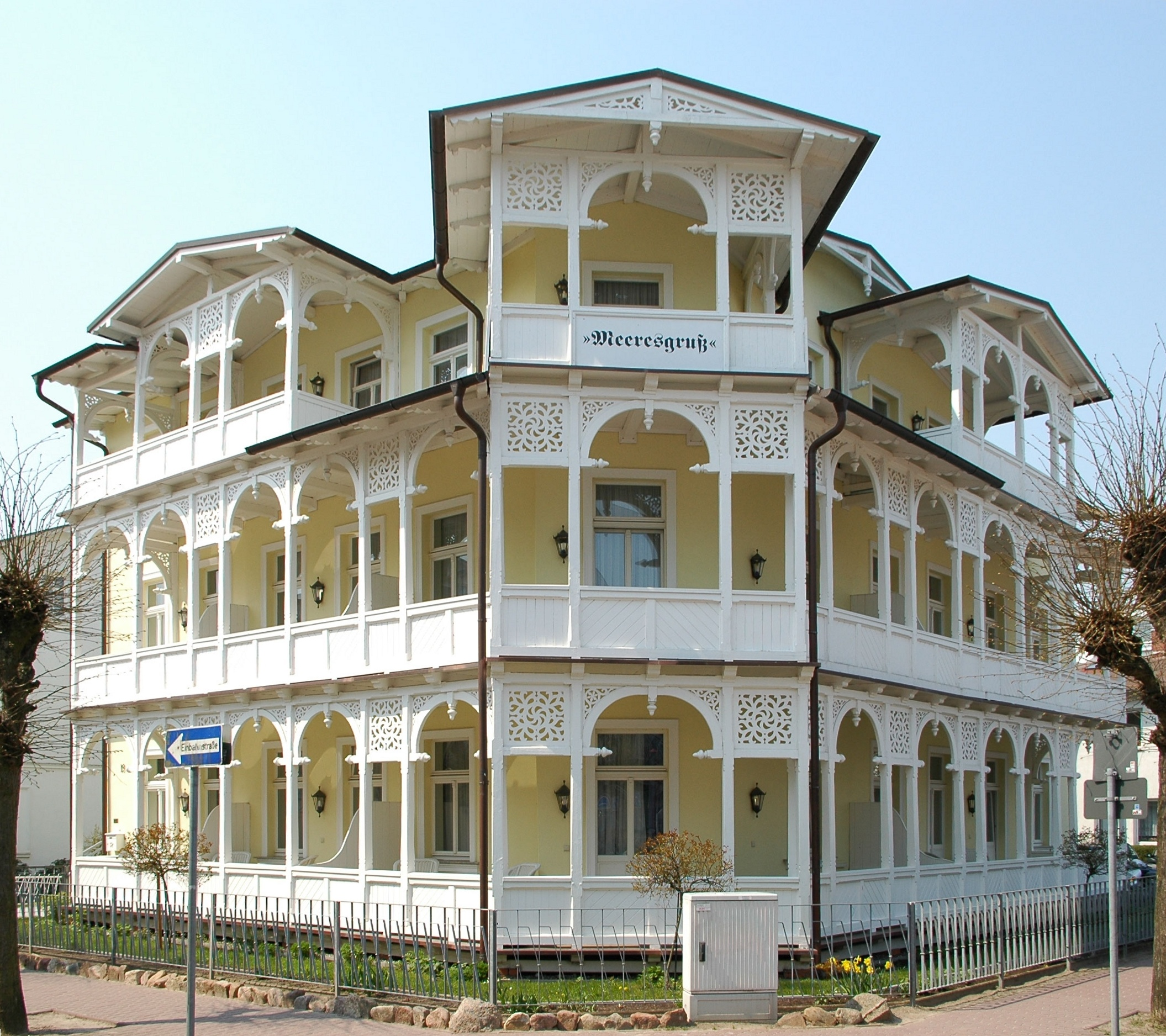
Villa Meeresgruss ("Sea Greeting") in Binz, Rügen Island - a typical mansion in German resort architecture style

Resort architecture (German: Bäderarchitektur) is an architectural style that is especially characteristic of spas and seaside resorts on the German Baltic coast. The style evolved since the foundation of Heiligendamm in 1793, and flourished especially around the year 1870, when resorts were connected to big cities via railway lines. Until today, many buildings on the German coasts are built in the style or feature distinct elements of resort architecture.

Single free-standing mansions featuring resort architecture are called Bädervilla (plural Bädervillen), translating as Resort Mansion or Spa Villa.

The architecture of inland health spas in Central Europe (i.e. those away from the coast), in Thuringia, the Czech Republic or Switzerland for instance, is generally referred to as spa architecture (Kurarchitektur).

== History ==
The architectural style of resort architecture was initially developed since the foundation of Heiligendamm in Mecklenburg in 1793, the first continental European seaside resort, as a style mixture that should appeal to the upper class, like the aristocracy and businessmen of Europe.

The style especially received a boost with the railway lines connecting the then booming seaside resorts of Germany to European metropolitan areas in the late 19th and early 20th century. It can be a variation of several styles with new elements, including historicism and Art Nouveau, for instance. It is often characterised by two to four storey buildings whose façades are often decorated with balconies, gables and verandas. In larger villas there are occasionally central avants-corps. Arched or rectangular windows predominate, occasionally flanked by half-columns or blind pilasters. Triangular gables and occasionally also curved gables or small turrets close off the ends of the attics. What is special about this form of architecture is its basic composition in classical styles that are very freely combined and which may be mixed with Art Nouveau ornamentation, for instance on the capitals.

The most common colour is white, which is why the health spas are occasionally described as "white pearls". As a result, the rare examples in colour, for example, painted in Bordeaux red, olive green, beige or blue, set amongst their white counterparts, are very striking. Overall the buildings appear rather delicate and are often built of wood with a core of stone.

Among the best-known examples today are those found on the Baltic coast on the island of Rügen, for instance in Sellin, Binz or Göhren. Heiligendamm near Bad Doberan is the oldest German seaside spa; numerous buildings from the early spa era can be found there.

Entire ensembles in white with occasionally coloured buildings are found in the parish of Heringsdorf on the island of Usedom. As well as in Kühlungsborn. One of the oldest buildings featuring the resort style was built by Georg Bernhard von Bülow in 1845 in Heringsdorf, Villa Achterkerke. One of the art-historically most important buildings (due to its glass mosaic), is the Villa Oechsler in Heringsdorf, built in 1883 by Antonio Salviati.

The Wolgaster Holzbau company was internationally known for their chalet-inspired resort architecture wooden mansions. They were the first in the world to build prefabricated houses in the 19th century, in places such as Ahlbeck, Bansin, Binz and Heringsdorf.

== German seaside resorts with notable resort architecture ==
Most important coastal areas with seaside resorts in Germany:

- Baltic Sea: islands of Fehmarn, Hiddensee, Rügen, Usedom; Rostock, peninsula of Fischland, Darss and Zingst
- North Sea: East Frisian Islands and North Frisian Islands

Selection of German seaside resorts along the Baltic Sea and the North Sea coastlines, with major ensembles of resort architecture:

=== Baltic Sea ===
- Ahlbeck (Usedom)
- Ahrenshoop
- Bansin
- Binz
- Boltenhagen
- Fehmarn
- Glücksburg
- Göhren
- Graal-Müritz
- Heiligendamm
- Heringsdorf
- Kühlungsborn
- Laboe
- Lubmin
- Sassnitz
- Sellin
- Timmendorfer Strand
- Travemünde
- Ueckermünde
- Warnemünde
- Zingst
- Zinnowitz
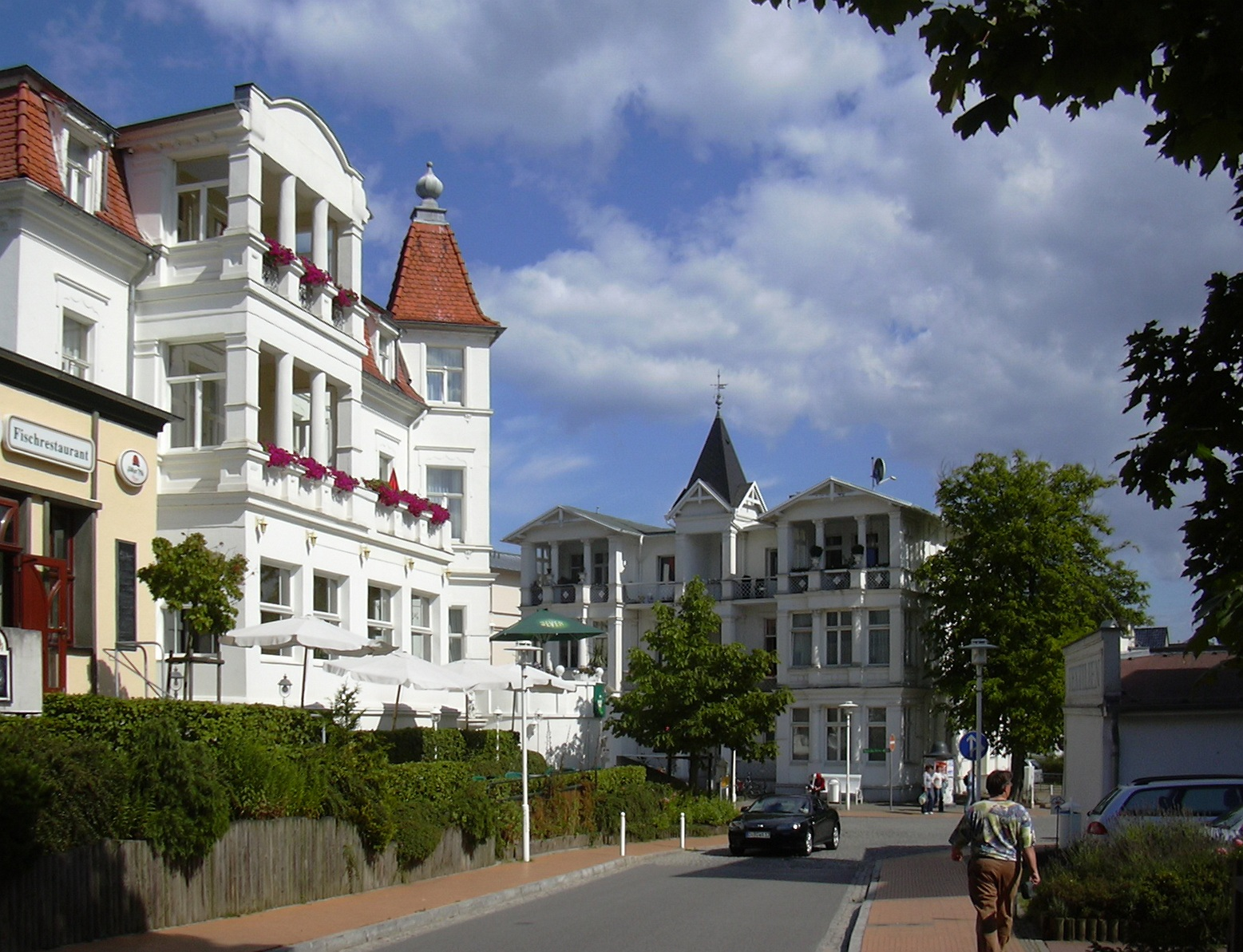
Resort architecture in Bansin

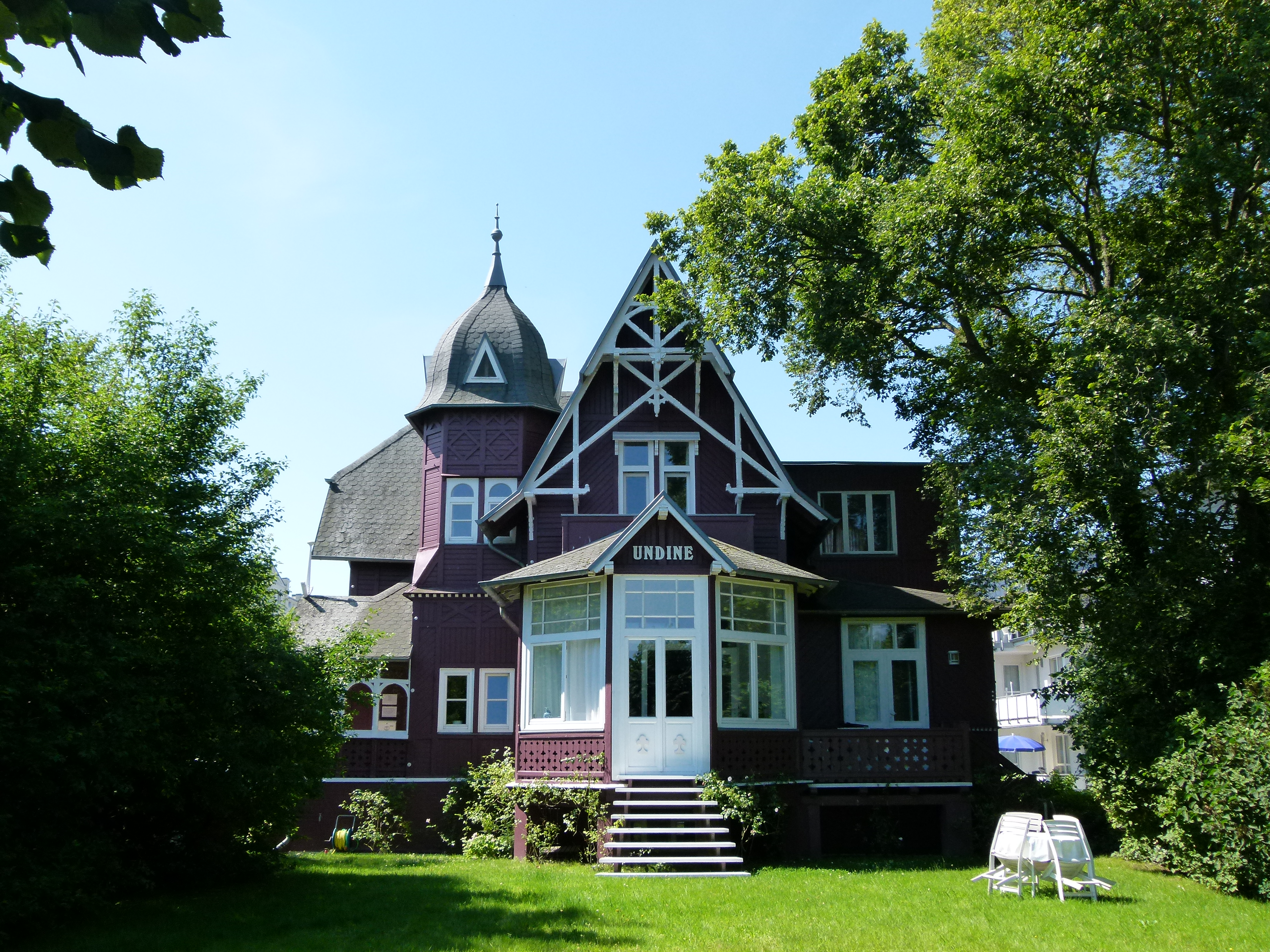
Villa Undine in Binz, built in 1885 by Wolgaster Holzbau, one of the first prefabricated buildings in the world - and an example of chalet-inspired resort architecture

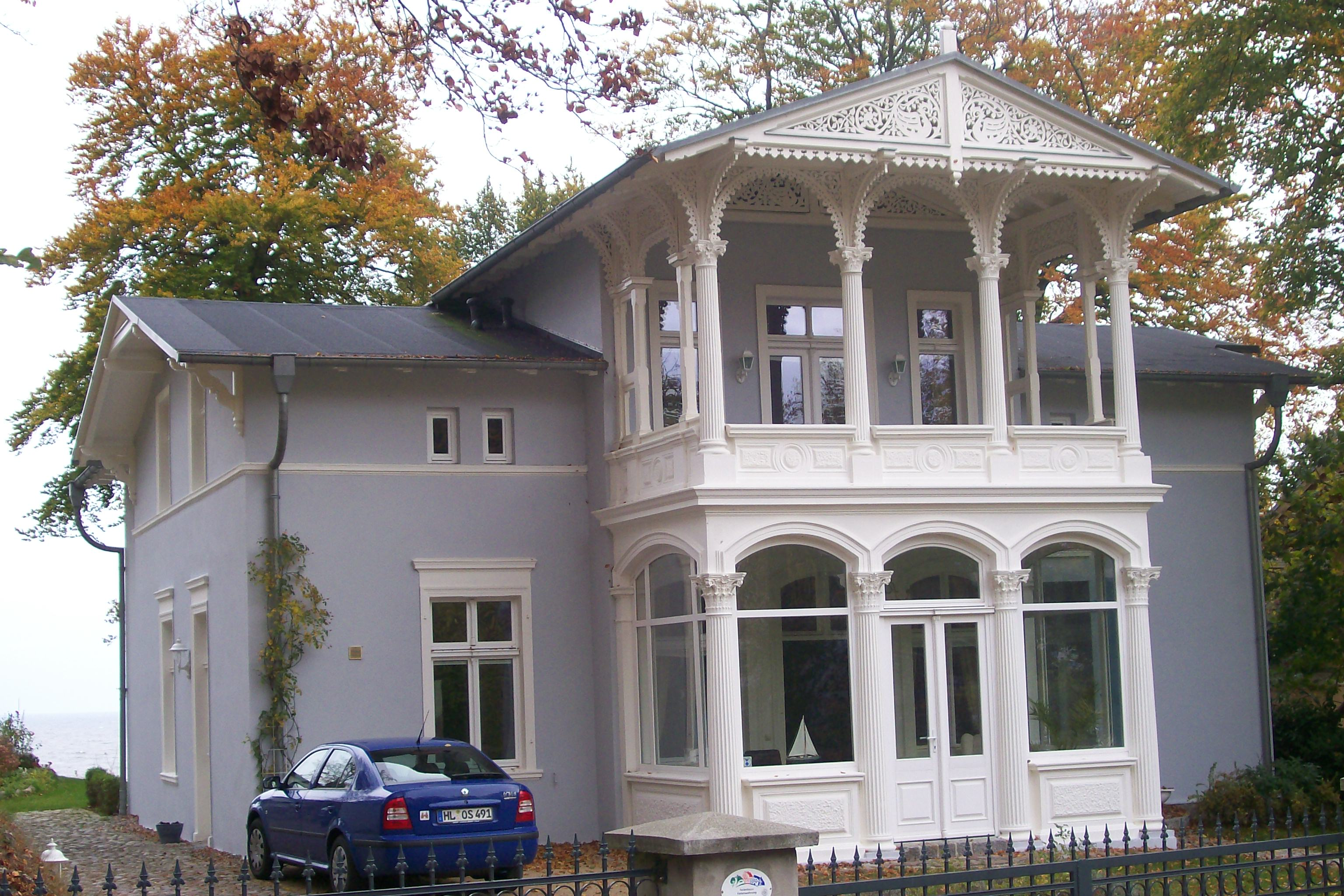
Villa Achterkerke in Heringsdorf, built 1845

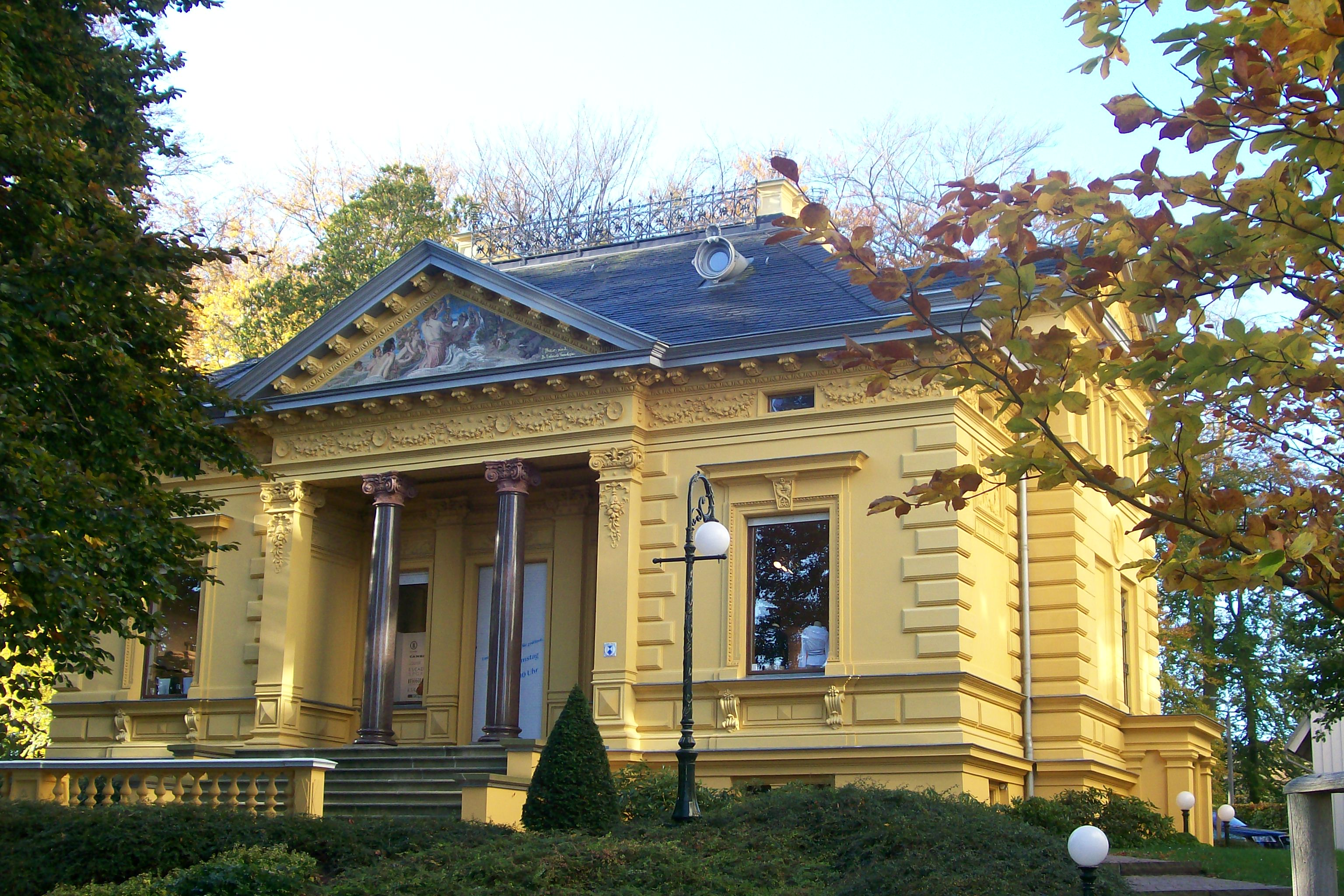
Villa Oechsler (1883) in Heringsdorf with glass mosaic by Antonio Salviati

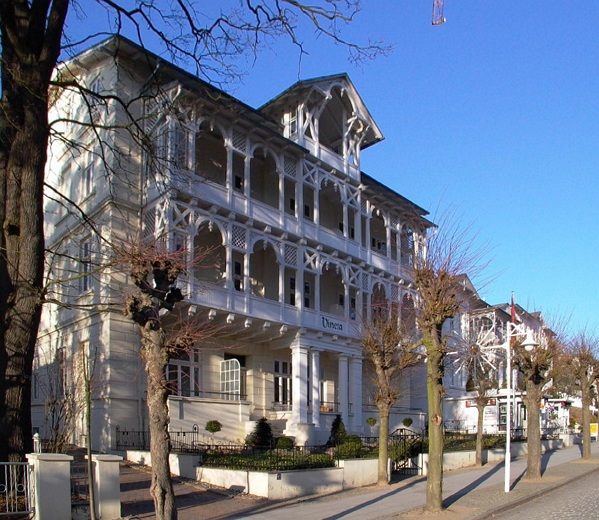
Villa Vineta from the year 1902 in Wilhelmstraße in the seaside resort of Sellin (Rugia)

=== North Sea ===
- Cuxhaven
- Nebel
- Spiekeroog
- Sylt
- Wangerooge
- Westerland
- Wyk auf Föhr

== Other seaside resorts with notable resort architecture ==
The formerly mostly German regions of eastern Pomerania, Pomerelia and East Prussia are part of Poland, the Baltic states and Russia today. Notable examples of resort architecture are to be found in seaside spas all along the Baltic coast in these regions.

=== Latvia ===
- Jūrmala
- Liepāja

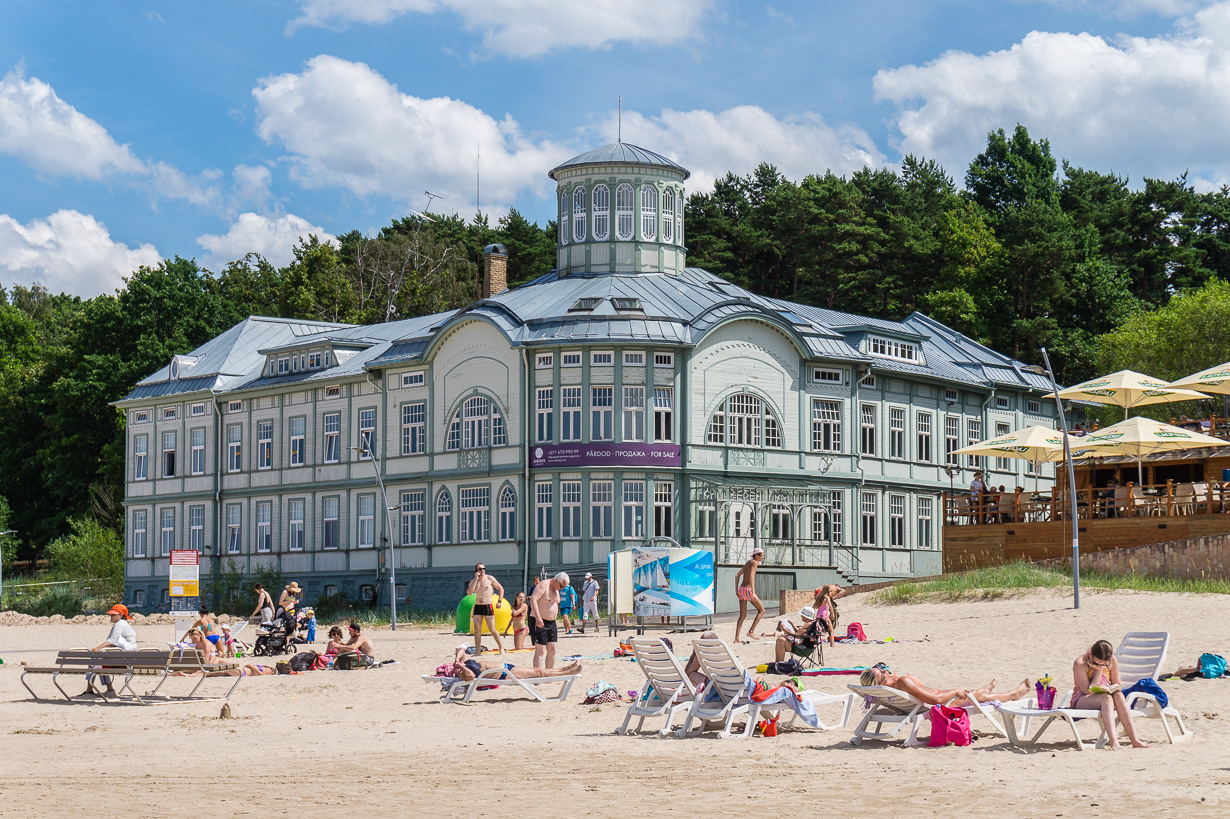
Beach House in Jūrmala, Latvia built around 1900

=== Lithuania ===
- Juodkrantė (Schwarzort)
- Klaipėda (Memel, with Mellneraggen)
- Neringa (Preil)
- Nida (Nidden)
- Palanga (Polangen)

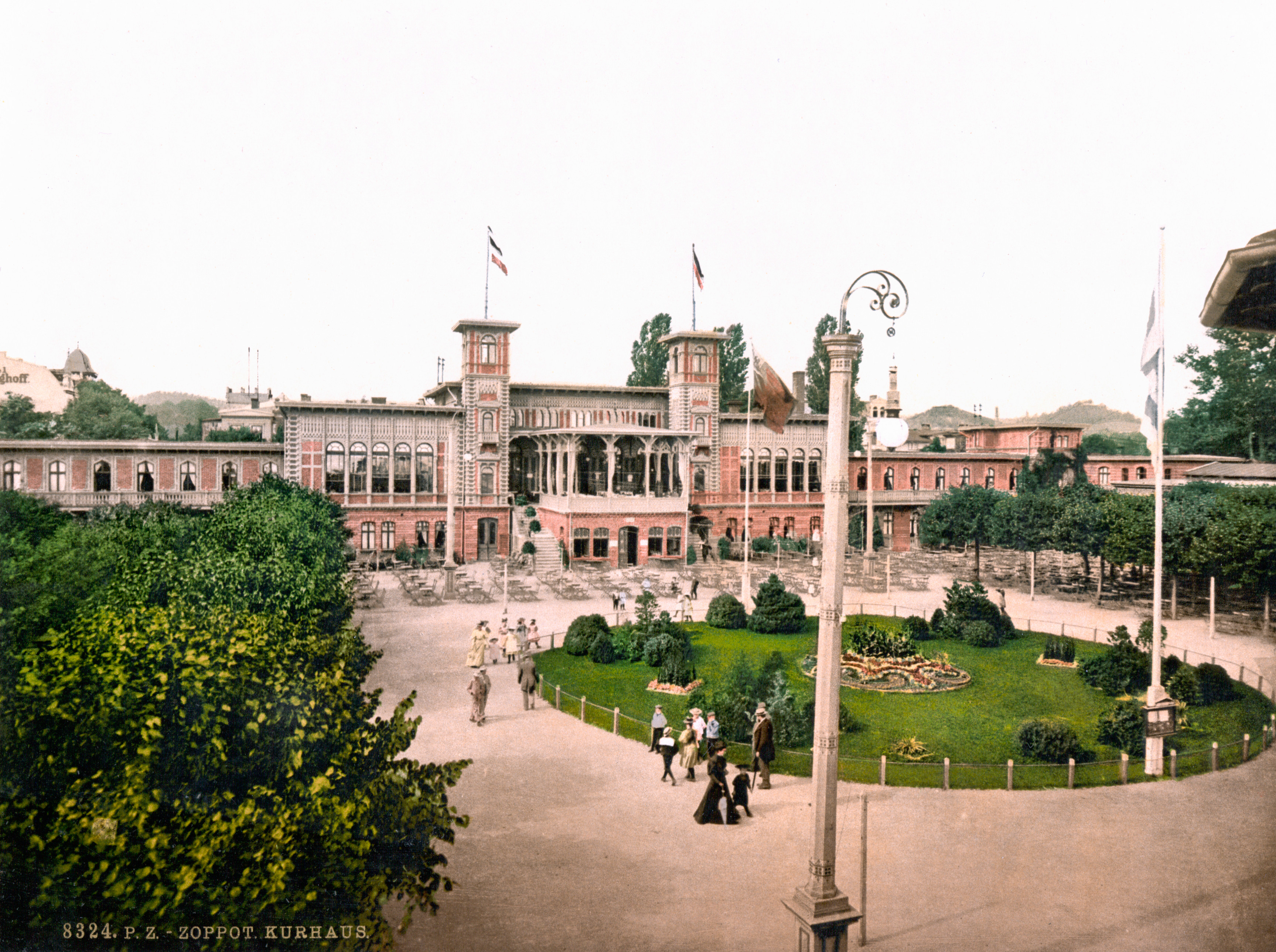
Kurhaus Sopot (Zoppot) near Gdańsk (Danzig) around 1900

=== Estonia ===
- Pärnu
- Haapsalu

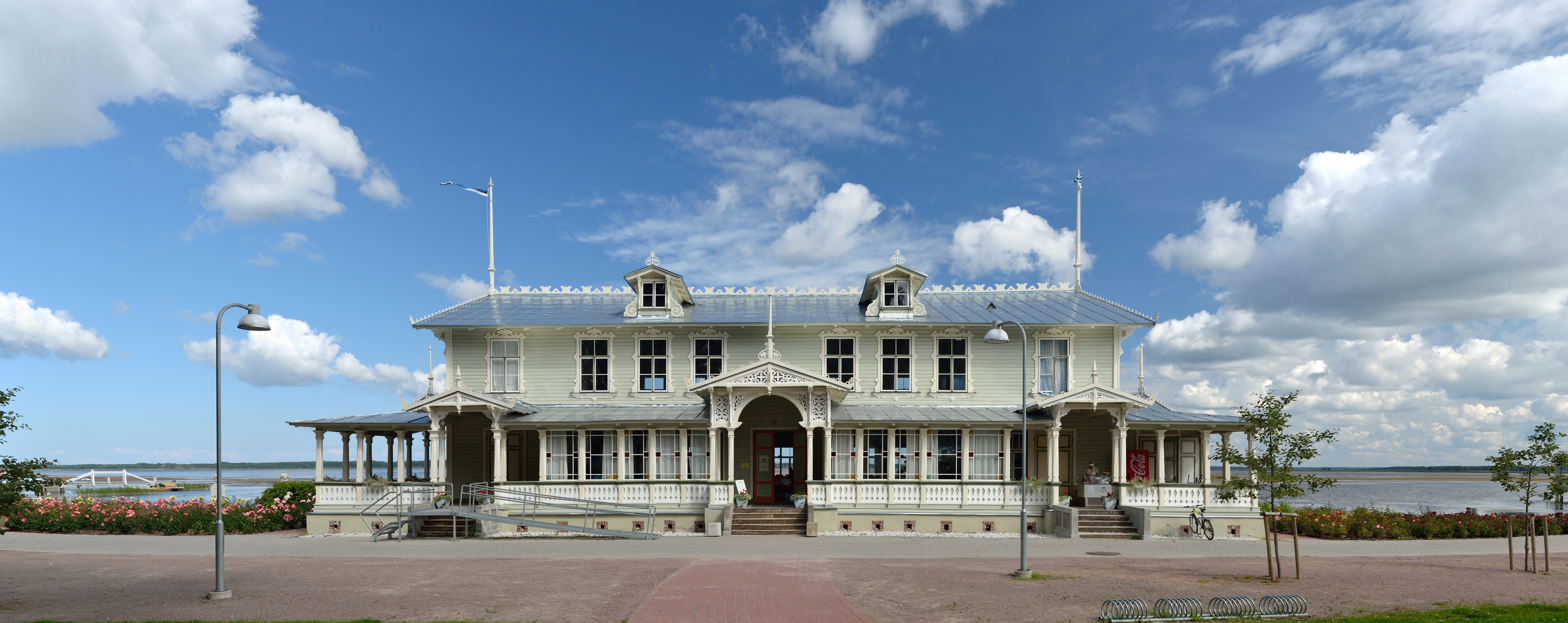
Resort hall in Haapsalu, Estonia

=== Poland ===
- Dziwnów (Dievenow)
- Łeba (Leba)
- Kamień Pomorski (Cammin in Pommern)
- Kołobrzeg (Kolberg)
- Międzyzdroje (Misdroy)
- Mielno (Groß Möllen)
- Sopot (Zoppot)
- Świnoujście (Swinemünde)
- Ustka (Stolpmünde)
- Ustronie Morskie (Henkenhagen)
- Władysławowo (Großendorf)

=== Russia ===
- Jantarny (Palmnicken)
- Rybachy (Rossitten)
- Svetlogorsk (Rauschen)
- Zelenogradsk (Cranz, with Priboi/Rosehnen)

=== Romania ===
- Baile Herculane (Herkulesbad)
- Borsec (Bad Borseck)
- Buziaș (Bad Busiasch)
- Govora
- Sinaia
- Slanic Moldova (Moldenmarkt)
- Sovata

== See also ==
- Arcachon villa
- Mar del Plata style

== Literature ==
- Susanne Grötz, Ursula Quecke (Hrsg.): Balnea. Architekturgeschichte des Bades. Jonas Verlag für Kunst und Literatur, Marburg 2006, ISBN 3-89445-363-X.
- Reno Stutz, Thomas Grundner: Bäderarchitektur in Mecklenburg-Vorpommern. Hinstorff, Rostock 2004, ISBN 3-356-01033-6 (Edition Kulturlandschaft Mecklenburg-Vorpommern).
- Wolfgang Schneider, Torsten Seegert: Pommersche Bäderarchitektur. Entstehung und Entwicklung. Ostseebad Binz. Heimat-Bild-Verlag, Gifhorn 2003, ISBN 3-9810092-0-7.
- Wilhelm Hüls, Ulf Böttcher: Bäderarchitektur. Hinstorff Verlag, Rostock 1998, ISBN 3-356-00791-2.
