= Ahlbeck, Heringsdorf =

District in Mecklenburg-Vorpommern, Germany

- Ortsteil of Heringsdorf
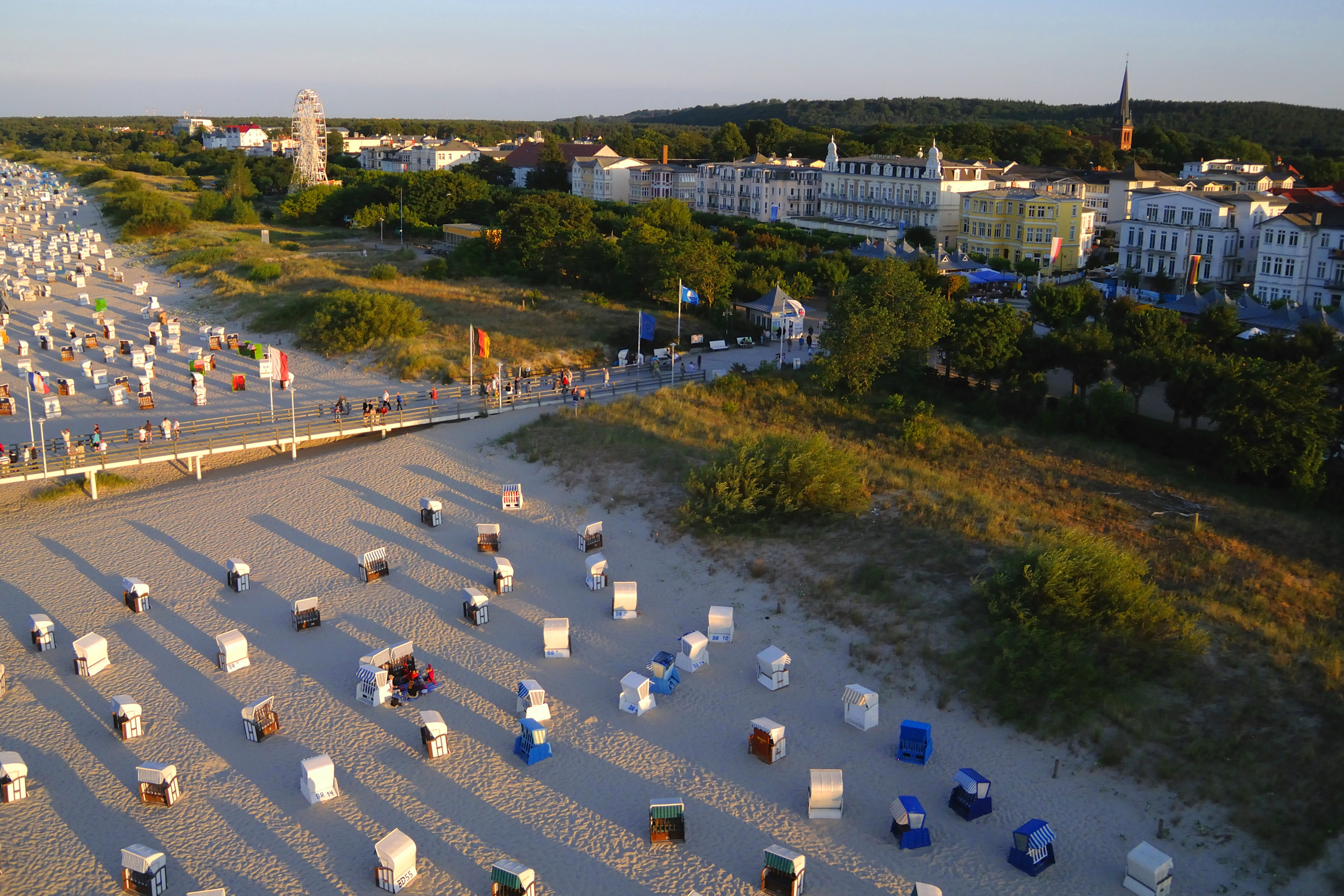
- Seaside

- Flag Coat of arms
- Interactive map of Ahlbeck, Heringsdorf
- Location within Germany Location within Mecklenburg-Vorpommern
- Coordinates: 53°56′N 14°11′E
- Country: Germany
- State: Mecklenburg-Vorpommern
- District: Vorpommern-Greifswald
- Municipality: Heringsdorf

Population (2003)
  - Total: 3,395
- Time zone: UTC+01:00 (CET)
  - Summer (DST): UTC+02:00 (CEST)

Ahlbeck is a village (Ortsteil) of the Heringsdorf municipality on the island of Usedom on the Baltic coast. It is the easternmost of the so-called Kaiserbäder ("Imperial Spas") seaside resorts on the German part of the island, next to the border with Poland and the city of Świnoujście, connected by the longest beach promenade in Europe spanning more than 12 km (7 mi) from Bansin to Świnoujście.

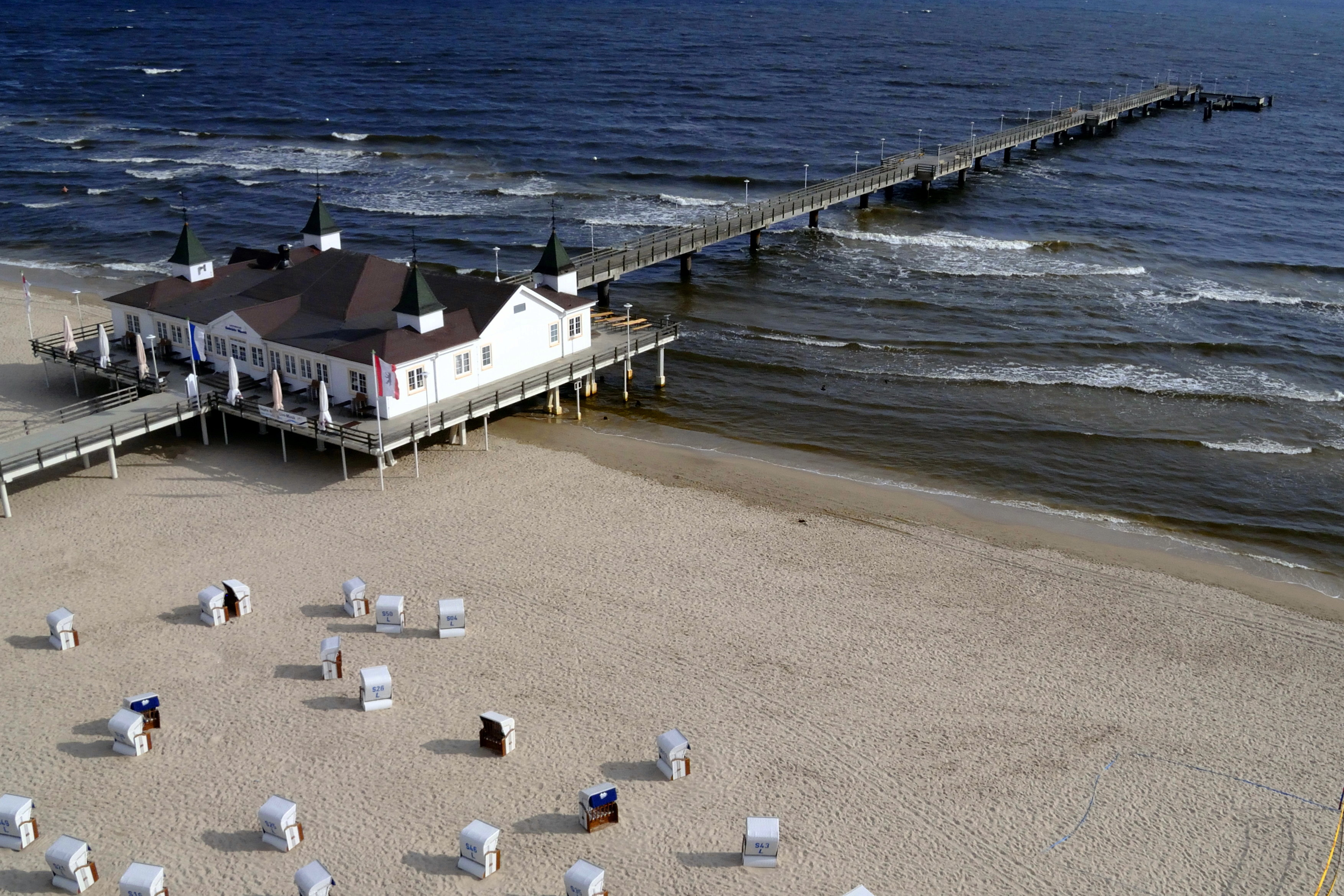
Ahlbeck pier

== History ==
First mentioned as Ahlebeck (Low German for 'eel creek') in 1693, fishermen settled the side after Usedom had passed from Sweden to Prussia upon the 1720 Treaty of Stockholm. In the 19th century, the settlement quickly rose to a stylish seaside resort.

== Sights ==
Major attractions include the famous 280 m (920 ft) long Seebrücke and the oldest preserved pier in Germany. Ahlbeck has numerous scenic houses and mansions in the German Gründerzeit style of resort architecture. The bathing resort OstseeTherme is a popular tourist attraction; close to it, there is the architecturally noteworthy Observation Tower Ahlbeck with three observation decks and an elevator.

== People ==
- Carola Stern (1925-2006), German journalist and writer
