= Heringsdorf =

Kaiserbad Heringsdorf
- Municipality
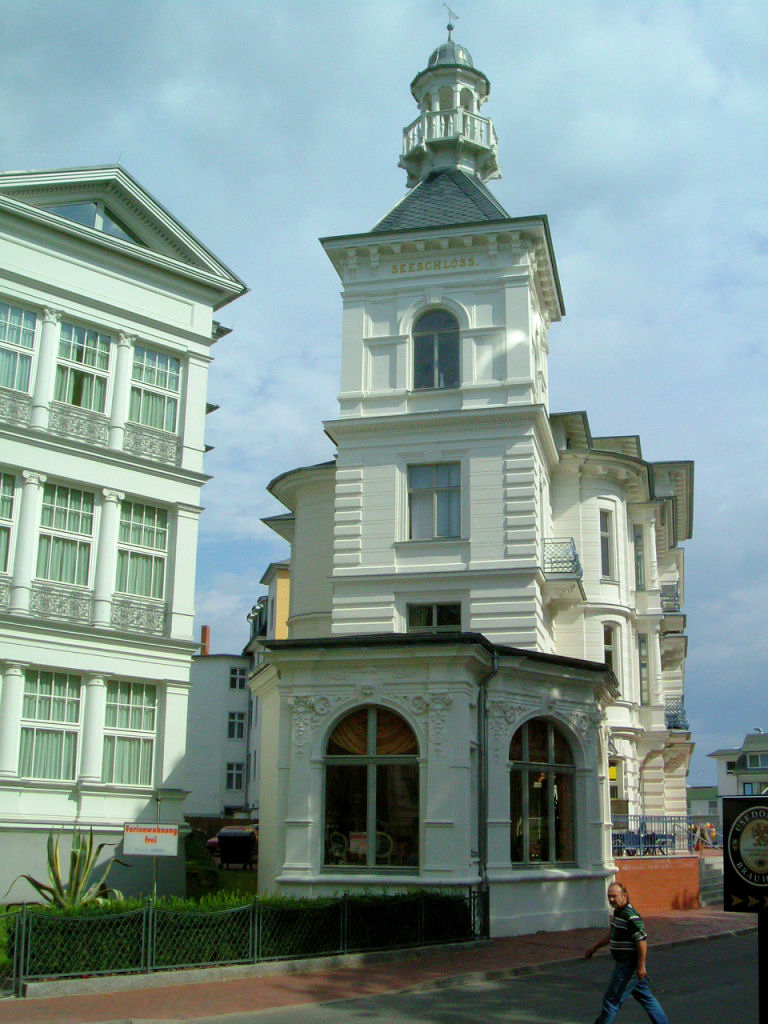
- Resort architecture (Bäderarchitektur) in Heringsdorf

- Coat of arms

- Location of Kaiserbad; Heringsdorf within Vorpommern-Greifswald district
- Interactive map of Kaiserbad; Heringsdorf
- Location within Germany Location within Mecklenburg-Vorpommern
- Coordinates: 53°58′N 14°10′E
- Country: Germany
- State: Mecklenburg-Vorpommern
- District: Vorpommern-Greifswald
- Subdivisions: 4

Government
  - Mayor: Laura Isabelle Marisken (Ind.)

Area
  - Total: 37.66 km^{2} (14.54 sq mi)
- Elevation: 5 m (16 ft)

Population (2025-12-31)
  - Total: 7,274
  - Density: 193.1/km^{2} (500.3/sq mi)
- Time zone: UTC+01:00 (CET)
  - Summer (DST): UTC+02:00 (CEST)
- Postal codes: 17419, 17424, 17429
- Dialling codes: 038378
- Vehicle registration: VG
- Website: http://gemeinde-ostseebad-heringsdorf.de/

Heringsdorf is a semi-urban municipality and a popular seaside resort on Usedom Island in Western Pomerania, Germany. It is also known by the name Kaiserbad (English: Emperor's Spa).

The municipality was formed in January 2005 out of the former municipalities of Heringsdorf, Ahlbeck and Bansin. Until January 2006, the municipality was called Dreikaiserbäder, literally meaning Three Imperial Spas, a reference to several vacation visits of the German emperor Wilhelm II until 1918.

For the same reason, the fine sandy beach stretching about 12 km (7.5 mi) from Bansin over Heringsdorf to Ahlbeck and Swinemünde (nowadays a Polish spa), is also called Kaiserstrand (Imperial Beach). The continuous Baltic Sea beach of Usedom Island has an overall length of exactly 40 km (25 mi) and an average width of 40 m (130 ft).

Tourism is the dominant economic sector of the Imperial Spas, with an increasing number of hotels and vacation homes every year.

== Overview ==
Heringsdorf is located on the Baltic Sea coast of the island of Usedom, about 10 km as the crow flies northwest of Świnoujście.

Heringsdorf has been one of the most popular resorts on the German Baltic shore since its foundation. It consists of three parts: Ahlbeck on the Polish border, Heringsdorf proper (central part) and Bansin in the west. These three Kaiserbäder were the favourite spas of the German Emperors, and also called the bathtub of Berlin. They feature clean beaches and numerous scenic houses and mansions in the distinct style of Bäderarchitektur (resort architecture).

== Partner municipalities ==
Heringsdorf is partnered with other towns and municipalities, namely Beckum in North Rhine-Westphalia (Germany), Folgaria in Italy, La Celle-Saint-Cloud in France; as well as Grodków, Tolkmicko and the neighbouring Świnoujście in Poland. In addition, Heringsdorf is in frequent contact with Djerba in Tunisia and the embassy of Morocco in Berlin.

== Transport ==
The area is served by Heringsdorf Airport. Heringsdorf Station is the hub and headquarters of the Usedomer Bäderbahn.

== Images ==
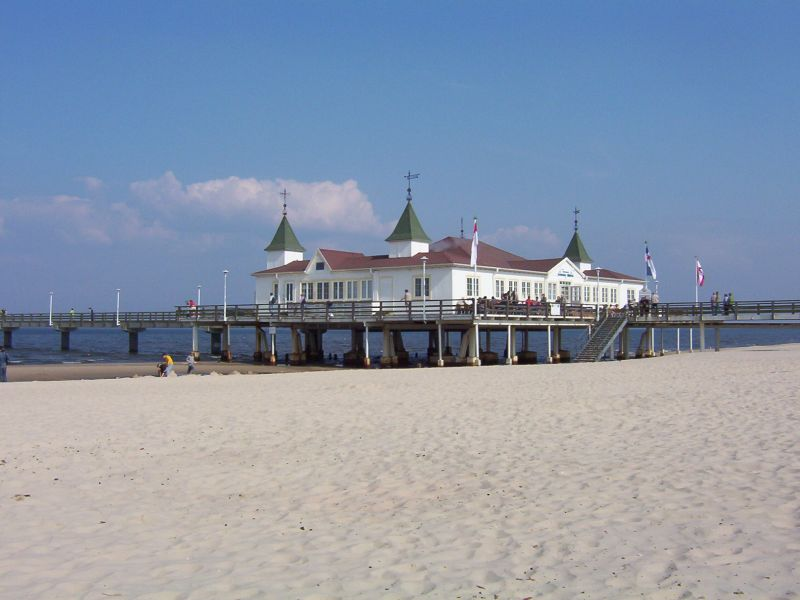
Ahlbeck pier

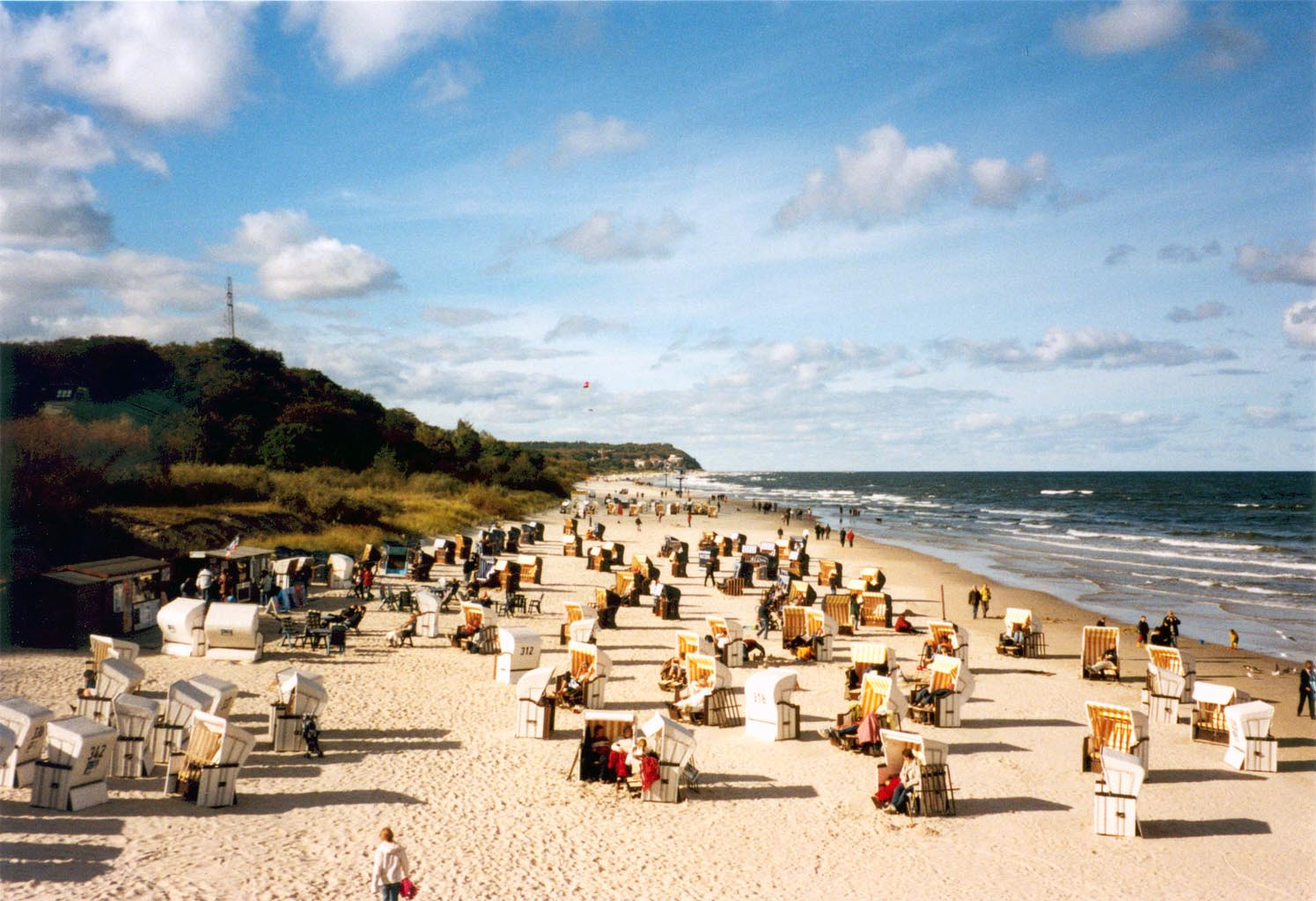
Beach of Heringsdorf

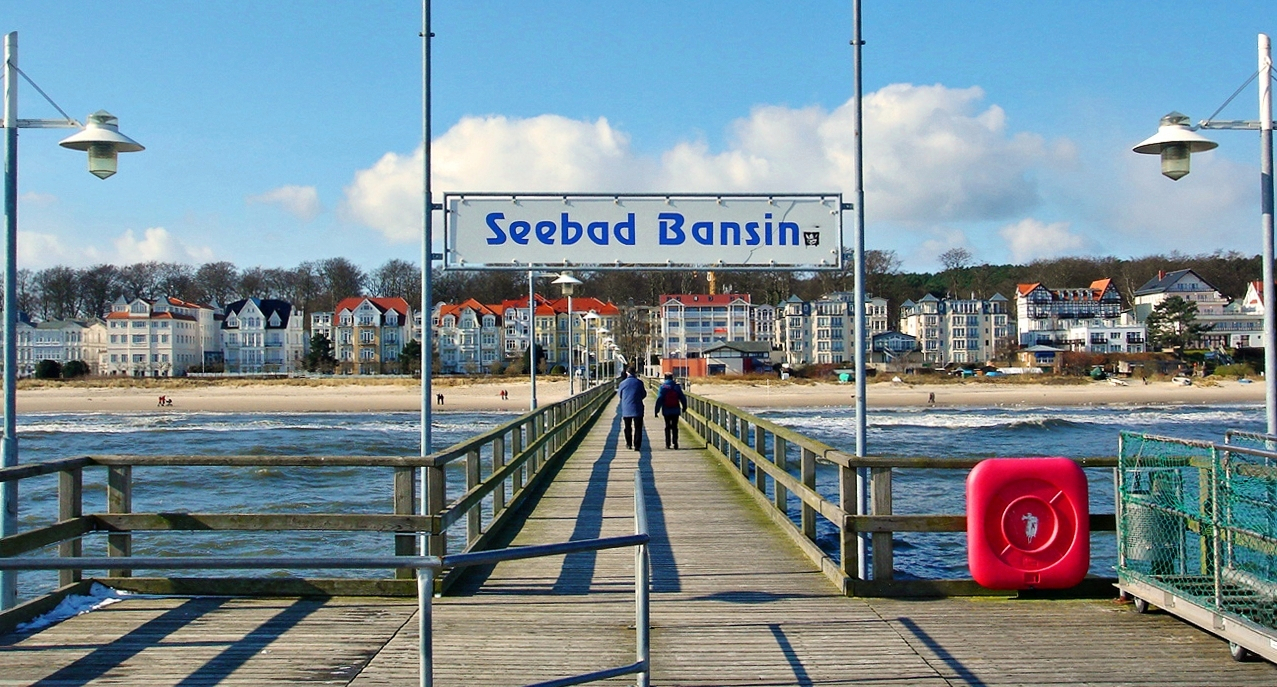
Bansin promenade seen from the pier

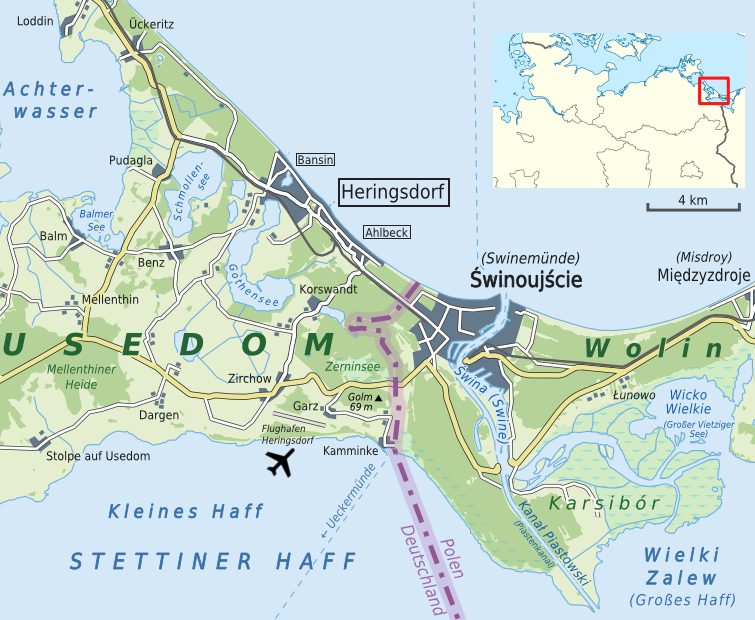
Map of Heringsdorf including Ahlbeck and Bansin and neighbouring city of Świnoujście in Poland

== See also ==
- Heringsdorf Airport
