= Bansin =

Part of Heringsdorf, Mecklenburg-Vorpommern, Germany

Coordinates: 53°58′N 14°09′E

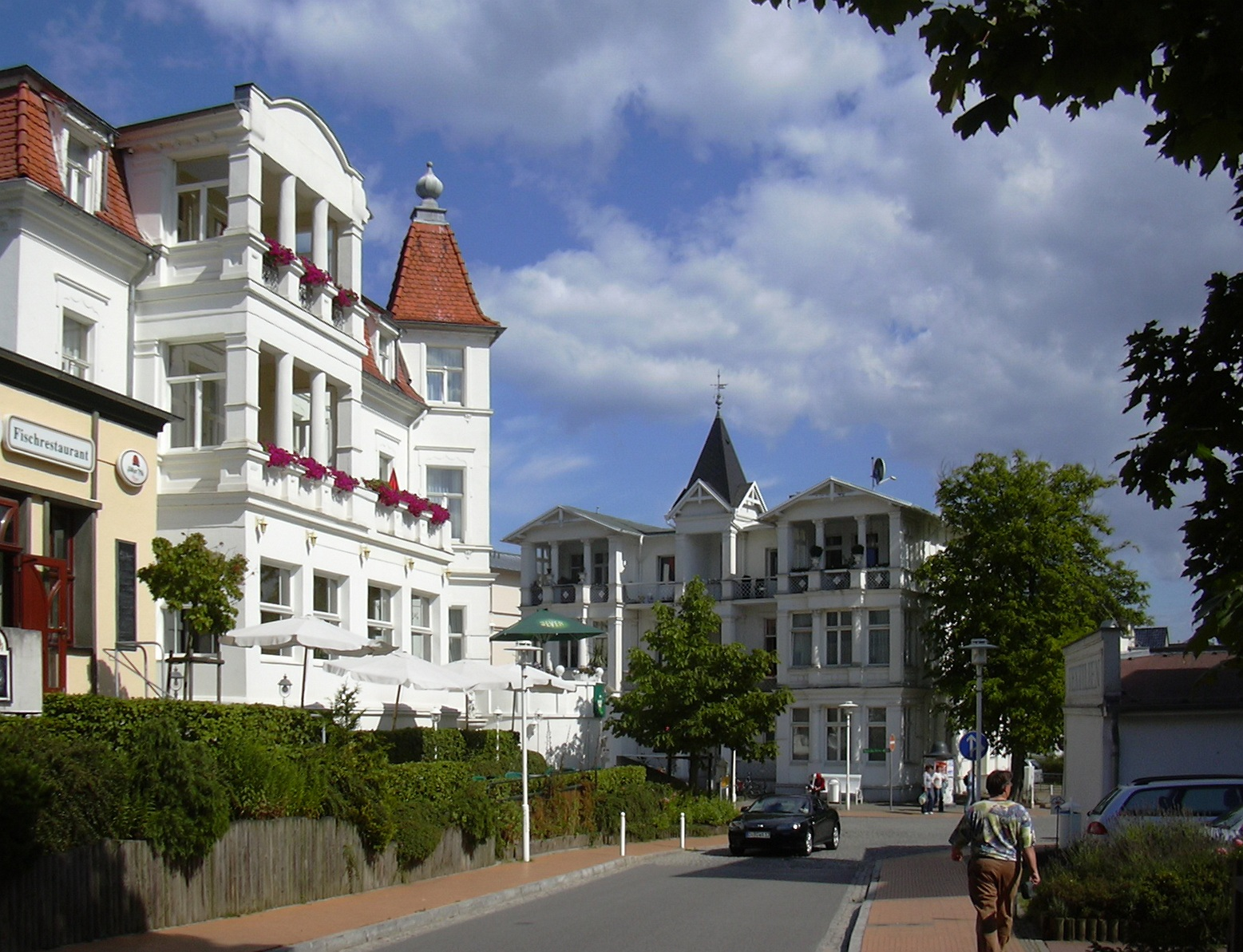
Typical Resort architecture (Bäderarchitektur) in Bansin

Bansin forms the westernmost part of the seaside resort town of Heringsdorf in Mecklenburg-Western Pomerania, Germany, on the east coast of Usedom island, about five miles by rail northwest of Świnoujście. Bansin is one of the most popular resorts on the German Baltic shore as part of the Heringsdorf municipality.

Besides the sandy beaches at the Baltic Sea coast, Bansin is close to the lakes Schloonsee, Schmollensee, Gothensee, as well as Grosser and Kleiner Krebssee.

The German Emperor Wilhelm II visited Bansin several times for vacation. One of the famous people who owned a summer home in Bansin was the astronomer Friedrich Simon Archenhold.
