= Streckelsberg =

Coordinates: 54.052467°N 14.01378°E

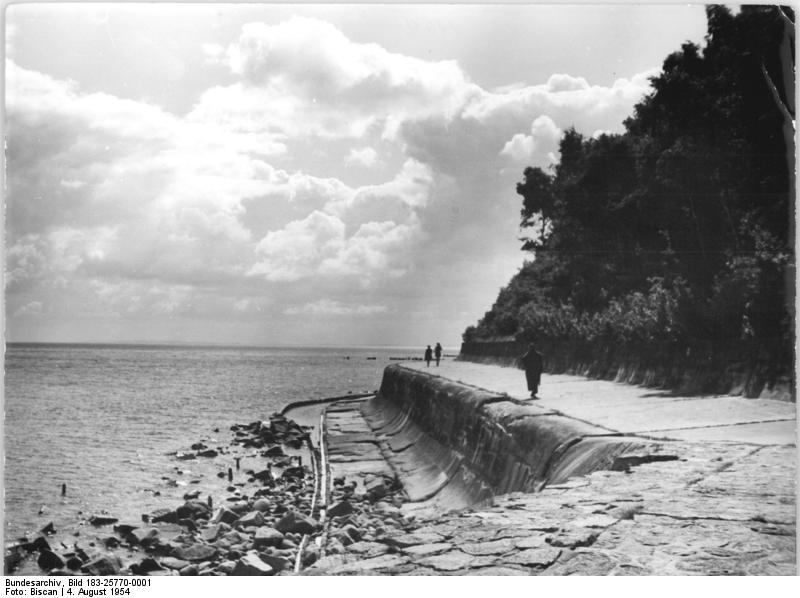
View of the Streckelsberg in 1954

The Streckelsberg is an approximately 58-metre high coastal cliff on the island of Usedom in North Germany. After the Golm and the Kückelsberg, the Streckelsberg is the third highest elevation on the island. The Streckelsberg is located half a kilometre southeast of the former fishing village and present-day seaside resort of Koserow directly on the Baltic Sea shore. To the southeast is the village of Kölpinsee; the B 111 federal road and Usedomer Bäderbahn railway run past the hill to the southwest.

== Geology ==
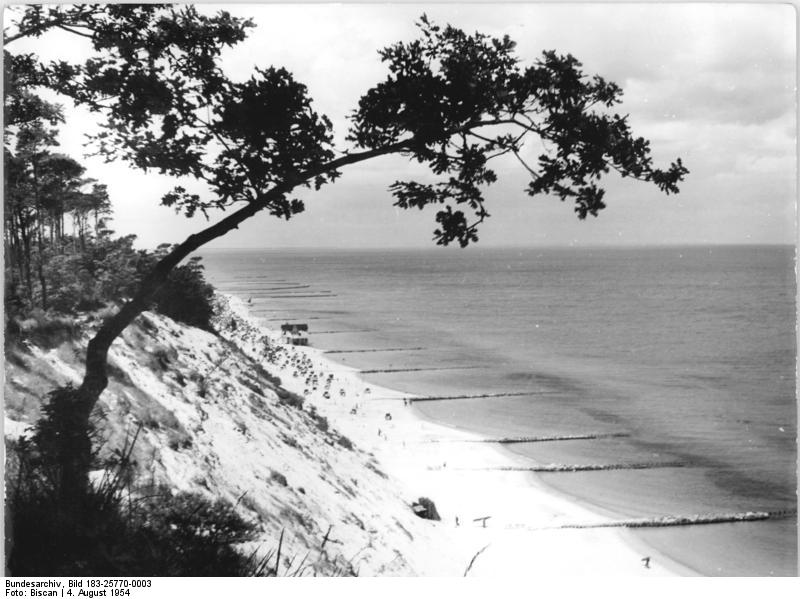
View from Streckelsberg in 1954

The Streckelsberg was formed during the last ice age as a push moraine. At that time over 16,000 years ago large parts of central and northern Europe were covered by a massive ice sheet. During the gradual retreat of the ice, there were repeated smaller advances of the glacier that led to the formation of moraines. The Streckelsberg was formed during such an advance, when the glacier pushed loose sedimentary rock in front of it, piling it up. When the ice retreated further, the first Baltic proglacial lake was formed from the meltwaters and rising sea levels, later the Yoldia Sea and Ancylus Lake were created and, ultimately, the Baltic Sea in its present shape. Originally, the Streckelsberg was much larger than it is today, both in terms of size and height. Through erosion processes the Streckelsberg soon shrank, particularly as a result of breakers from the Baltic Sea. Wave and wind erosion has reduced the Streckelsberg by 250 metres (820 ft) in the last 300 years. This process still continues, despite coastal protection measures taken in 1995, including groynes, two breakwaters, a triple protective wall and the dumping of artificial sand. In strong storms, parts of the cliff frequently break off and slump down onto the beach.

== Geological history of the island of Usedom and the Streckelsberg ==
The landscape of Northern Germany was formed as a result of several cold stages. Huge masses of ice advanced from Scandinavia to central Germany. In doing so they moved rocks of all sizes (glacial erratics) ahead of them into what is present-day Germany. The island of Usedom was created a result of the latest ice age, the Weichselian Glaciation, which reached its climax about 18,000 years ago. After huge ice masses (inland ice sheets) had melted, characteristic landforms were left behind. These are the ground moraines (areas that had been pushed ahead of the advancing ice masses), the terminal moraines (heaps of rock and earth material pushed up and compressed into hills at the southern edge of the inland ice block into hills) and the sandur (sands washed out of the terminal moraines as the ice melted, which were deposited on the southern side of the terminal moraines). The Streckelsberg is such a terminal moraine, with an area of sandur to the south as far as the Achterwasser lagoon. The Baltic Sea on the north side of the Streckelsberg can be regarded as a giant terminal moraine lake. 7000 to 5000 years ago the island did not exist in its current form. Only the terminal moraines, also known as island or geest cores stuck out from the waters of the Baltic Sea. The Baltic Sea carried off material from these island cores with the force of waves and prevailing currents, depositing it on their leeward sides, so that spits began to be formed. These spits grew as more material was deposited to form sand bars, so that the area between the island cores fully silted up. Examples of such sedimentation zones are the Pudaglasenke and the lowland area between Peenemünde and Zinnowitz, and between Zinnowitz and Koserow.

== Flora ==
The vegetation of the area is divided into layers like any natural habitat in the temperate climatic zone. On the field layer are mosses and fungi (penny bun or cep, honey fungus), in addition there is the herbaceous layer, which is characterized by various species depending on the season. In spring when the soil is warmed up quickly by sunlight, spring flowers like hepatica appear, which conjure up blue carpets on the forest floor, followed by anemone. As the temperatures rise, leaves sprout on the trees. The level of sunlight under the trees reduces and species such as Spring Vetchling, Lily of the Valley, May Lily, Moschatel, Herb Paris and Woodruff appear, which flourish under conditions of low light. As the foliage becomes denser, shade-loving summer flowers appear. The first ones are the remaining native orchids of our deciduous forests. On the Streckelsberg: Common Twayblade, Lesser Butterfly-orchid, Bird's-nest Orchid and Red helleborine. Rather less colourful summer flowers in the beech woods are the Small Balsam, Common Figwort, Wood Avens, Wall Lettuce, Baneberry and Enchanter's-nightshade. Characteristic grasses of the herbaceous layer of the beech forest are False Brome, Wood Melick and Giant Fescue. The overlying shrub layer consists of bushes and saplings, such as Elder, Rowan, Fly Honeysuckle, Common Honeysuckle, Dewberry, Raspberry, Blackthorn, Common Ivy, Alpine Currant, Hazel, Goat Willow, Bird Cherry, three species of wild rose, Common Buckthorn and Viburnum. There are also young trees of the species Norway Maple, sycamore and Silver Birch. The tree layer is dominated by beech trees that are more than 180 years old and, on the slopes of the hill, by equally ancient Scots Pines.

== Afforestation of the Streckelsberg by Senior Forester Schrödter ==
Senior Forester (Oberförster) Schrödter afforested the Streckelsberg in 1818 and 1819 in its present form with beech trees in order to better protect the hill and the village of Koserow behind it from the harsh sea winds and from drifting sand. Schrödter was born in 1753 in Klein Behnitz (in the March of Brandenburg). After several years of training he became a royal court and district hunter (Hofjäger and Revierjäger). From 1810 he was the district forester in Zinnowitz. After the afforestation of the Streckelsberg, he became the senior forester in the Neupudagla Forest District in 1819. He died in 1828.

The Wolgast Gazette (Wolgaster Anzeiger), No. 61 of 21 May 1900, reported that: "Schrödter rendered great service in the spheres of forestry and sand dunes. He knew, in a masterly way how to anchor and cultivate the bare, infertile sands on the beach at Koserow, with which the wind played games. In particular, he did a great job of afforesting the Streckelsberg at the seaside resort of Koserow, which is now protected by the woods against the harsh sea winds and unwelcome sand drifts. The Schrödter Stone (Schrödterstein), an undressed granite rock has, in gold letters on a polished plate the words:

Senior Forester Schrödter afforested the Streckelsberg in 1818 and 1819

== Fauna ==
The wildlife of the area corresponds to the various layers of vegetation. On and in the earth live the sand lizard and common lizard, the mole, the common shrew, the tundra vole and red fox. In the tree layer the beech marten and red squirrel may be seen. The herb and shrub layer are home to many species of songbird. The main bird species on the Streckelsberg are the robin wren, great tit, blue tit, chiffchaff, red-breasted flycatcher, willow warbler, blackcap and lesser whitethroat. The somewhat larger blackbird and song thrush also live on the Streckelsberg. In the tree layer there are golden oriole, chaffinch, stock dove, tawny owl, wood pigeon, hooded crow and goshawk. Bats also have their summer homes in tree hollows and cracks. Depending on the biodiversity of the flora, many insect species live on Streckelsberg. In addition to various butterflies there are also beetles, including the capricorn beetle, sawyer and longhorn beetle, whose larvae live on dead wood.

Waterfowl

From the walking trail on the top of the cliffs on the Streckelsberg a wide variety of water birds may be seen including: Mallard, black-headed gull, common gull, herring gull, great black-backed gull, great crested grebe, coot, cormorant and mute swan. Regular migrants from their breeding grounds north of Usedom that may be seen in shallow water are the tufted duck, scaup, eider duck, goldeneye, long-tailed duck, red-breasted merganser and common merganser.

== Nature conservation ==
On 12 December 1957 Streckelsberg was designated as a nature reserve, which today is the Usedom Island Nature Park. The state of the terrain is classified as satisfactory, because parts of it are used for forestry

== Koserow Observation Tower ==
The Koserow Observation Tower was a Wehrmacht observation tower on the Streckelsberg built in the late 1930s for observers of air raids (e.g., on the ports of Swinemünde and Szczecin). The tower's observation deck later had a cinetheodolite for the optical tracking of missile tests from Peenemünde-West (e.g., V-1 flying bomb) and the Peenemünde Army Research Center (V-2 rocket).

== Sources ==
- Umweltministerium Mecklenburg-Vorpommern (publ.): Streckelsberg 260. In: Die Naturschutzgebiete in Mecklenburg-Vorpommern. Demmler-Verlag, Schwerin 2003, pp. 166 f.
