= List of spa towns in Germany =

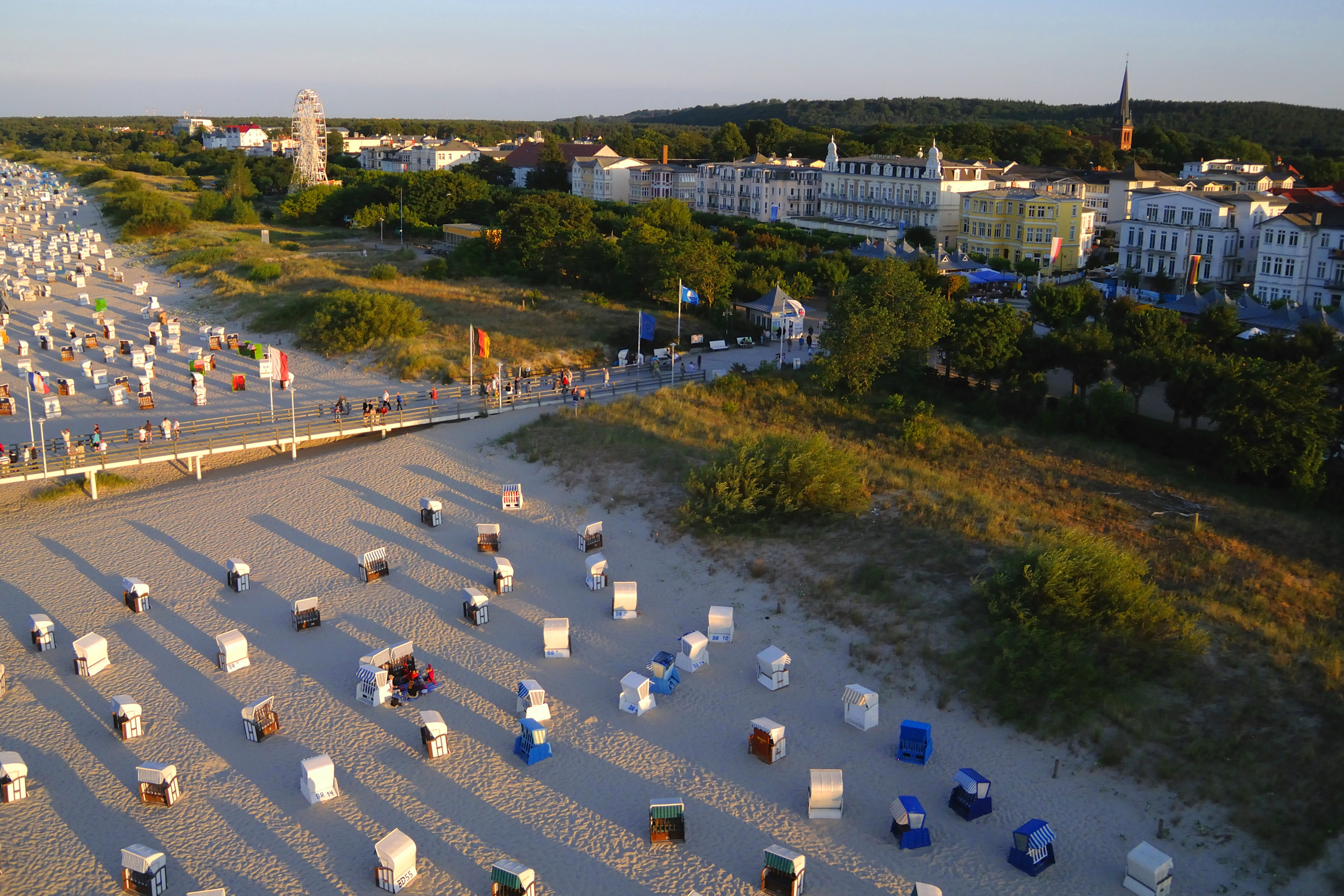
Ahlbeck, a typical Baltic seaside resort (island of Usedom)

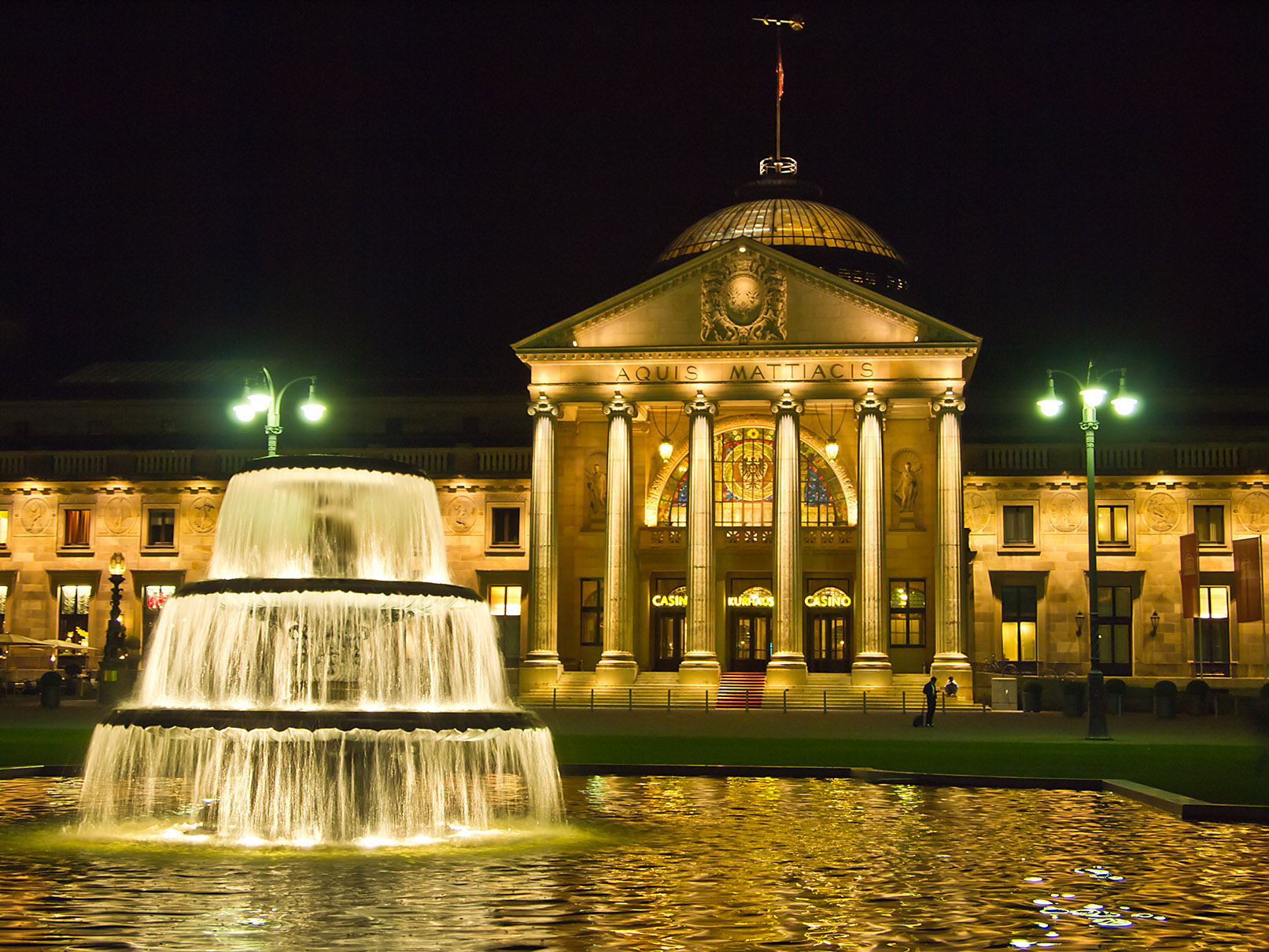
Kurhaus in Wiesbaden, Germany's biggest spa city

The following is a list of spa towns in Germany. As of 2026, there are 350 officially recognized spa towns across the country, including three that have been designated by UNESCO as Great Spa Towns of Europe (Bad Ems, Baden-Baden, and Bad Kissingen).

The word Bad (English: bath) is normally used as a prefix (Bad Vilbel) or a suffix (Marienbad, Wiesbaden) to denote the town in question is a spa town. In any case, Bad as a prefix is an official designation and requires governmental authorization (which may also be suspended if a town fails to maintain the required standards).

The word Kurort is also used, meaning a place for a cure. However not all Kurorte are spa towns; there are also Kurorte which are visited for their pure air (Luftkurorte, for example).

This list is alphabetical, the states of the spa towns are added, as well as their official German category designation (Heilbad, Seebad etc.).

For seaside resorts, see List of seaside resorts in Germany.

== A ==
- Aachen (Aachen has been officially certified as "Bad Aachen", but for alphabetical reasons usually declines to use the prefix)
- Aalen
- Ahlbeck
- Ahrenshoop, Mecklenburg-Vorpommern – Ostseeheilbad
- Alexisbad
- Altenau, Lower Saxony – Heilklimatischer Kurort
- Altenberg, Saxony – Kneippkurort
- Aulendorf

== B ==
- Baabe, Mecklenburg-Vorpommern – Ostseebad
- Bad Abbach, Bavaria – Mineralheilbad, Moorheilbad
- Bad Aibling, Landkreis Rosenheim, Bayern – Moorheilbad
- Bad Alexandersbad, Landkreis Wunsiedel im Fichtelgebirge, Bayern – Mineralheilbad, Moorheilbad
- Bad Arolsen, Landkreis Waldeck-Frankenberg, Hessen – Heilbad
- Bad Bayersoien, Landkreis Garmisch-Partenkirchen, Bayern – Moorheilbad
- Bad Bederkesa, Landkreis Cuxhaven, Niedersachsen – Ort mit Moor-Kurbetrieb
- Bad Bellingen, Landkreis Lörrach, Baden-Württemberg – Heilbad
- Bad Belzig, Landkreis Potsdam-Mittelmark, Brandenburg – Thermalsoleheilbad
- Bad Bentheim, Landkreis Grafschaft Bentheim, Niedersachsen – Moorheilbad, Mineralheilbad
- Bad Bergzabern, Landkreis Südliche Weinstraße, Rheinland-Pfalz – Kneippheilbad, Heilklimatischer Kurort
- Bad Berka, Landkreis Weimarer Land, Thüringen – Ort mit Heilquellenkurbetrieb
- Bad Berleburg, Kreis Siegen-Wittgenstein, Nordrhein-Westfalen – Kneippheilbad
- Bad Berneck im Fichtelgebirge, Landkreis Bayreuth, Bayern – Kneippheilbad
- Bad Bertrich, Landkreis Cochem-Zell, Rheinland-Pfalz – Thermal-Mineralheilbad
- Bad Bevensen, Landkreis Uelzen, Niedersachsen – Jod-Sole-Heilbad
- Bad Birnbach, Landkreis Rottal-Inn, Bayern – Heilbad
- Bad Blankenburg, Landkreis Saalfeld-Rudolstadt, Thüringen – Heilbad
- Bad Bocklet, Landkreis Bad Kissingen, Bayern – Mineralheilbad, Moorheilbad
- Bad Bodendorf, Stadt Sinzig, Landkreis Ahrweiler, Rheinland-Pfalz – Mineralheilbad
- Bad Bodenteich, Landkreis Uelzen, Niedersachsen – Kneippkurort
- Bad Boll, Gemeinde Bad Boll, Landkreis Göppingen, Baden-Württemberg – Heilquellen-Kurbetrieb
- Bad Brambach, Vogtlandkreis, Sachsen – Mineralheilbad
- Bad Bramstedt, Kreis Segeberg, Schleswig-Holstein – Solebad, Moorbad
- Bad Breisig, Landkreis Ahrweiler, Rheinland-Pfalz – Mineralheilbad
- Bad Brückenau, Landkreis Bad Kissingen, Bayern – Mineralheilbad, Moorheilbad
- Bad Buchau, Landkreis Biberach, Baden-Württemberg – Moorheilbad, Mineralheilbad
- Bad Camberg, Landkreis Limburg-Weilburg, Hessen – Kneippheilbad
- Bad Cannstatt, Stadt Stuttgart, Baden-Württemberg – Heilquellen-Kurbetrieb
- Bad Colberg, Landkreis Hildburghausen, Thüringen – Heilbad
- Bad Ditzenbach, Landkreis Göppingen, Baden-Württemberg – Thermal-Mineralheilbad
- Bad Doberan, Landkreis Rostock, Mecklenburg-Vorpommern – Heilbad
- Bad Driburg, Kreis Höxter, Nordrhein-Westfalen – Moorheilbad, Mineralheilbad
- Bad Düben, Landkreis Nordsachsen, Sachsen – Moorheilbad
- Bad Dürkheim, Landkreis Bad Dürkheim, Rheinland-Pfalz – Heilbad
- Bad Dürrheim, Schwarzwald-Baar-Kreis, Baden-Württemberg – Soleheilbad, Heilklimatischer Kurort, Kneippkurort
- Bad Eilsen, Landkreis Schaumburg, Niedersachsen – Ort mit Heilquellen-Kurbetrieb
- Bad Elster, Vogtlandkreis, Sachsen – Mineral- und Moorheilbad
- Bad Ems, Rhein-Lahn-Kreis, Rheinland-Pfalz – Heilbad
- Bad Emstal, Landkreis Kassel, Hessen – Mineralheilbad
- Bad Endbach, Landkreis Marburg-Biedenkopf, Hessen – Kneippheilbad
- Bad Endorf, Landkreis Rosenheim, Bayern – Jod-Thermalbad
- Bad Essen, Landkreis Osnabrück, Niedersachsen – Ort mit Sole-Kurbetrieb
- Bad Fallingbostel, Landkreis Heidekreis, Niedersachsen – Kneippheilbad
- Bad Faulenbach, Stadt Füssen, Landkreis Ostallgäu, Bayern – Mineralheilbad, Moorheilbad, Kneippkurort
- Bad Feilnbach, Landkreis Rosenheim, Bayern – Moorheilbad
- Bad Frankenhausen, Kyffhäuserkreis, Thüringen – Soleheilbad
- Bad Fredeburg, Stadt Schmallenberg, Hochsauerlandkreis, Nordrhein-Westfalen – Kneippheilbad
- Bad Freienwalde, Landkreis Märkisch-Oderland, Brandenburg – Moorheilbad
- Bad Füssing, Landkreis Passau, Bayern – Thermal-Mineralheilbad
- Bad Gandersheim, Landkreis Northeim, Niedersachsen – Heilbad
- Bad Godesberg, city of Bonn, North Rhine-Westphalia
- Bad Gögging, Stadt Neustadt an der Donau, Landkreis Kelheim, Bayern – Schwefelheilbad, Moorheilbad
- Bad Gottleuba, Stadt Bad Gottleuba-Berggießhübel, Landkreis Sächsische Schweiz-Osterzgebirge, Sachsen – Moorheilbad
- Bad Griesbach, Landkreis Passau, Bayern – Heilbad
- Bad Grönenbach, Landkreis Unterallgäu, Bayern – Kneippheilbad
- Bad Grund, Landkreis Osterode am Harz, Niedersachsen – Ort mit Heilstollen-Kurbetrieb
- Bad Harzburg, Landkreis Goslar, Niedersachsen – Soleheilbad
- Bad Heilbrunn, Landkreis Bad Tölz-Wolfratshausen, Bayern – Mineralheilbad
- Bad Hermannsborn, Stadt Bad Driburg, Kreis Höxter, Nordrhein-Westfalen – Heilquellen-Kurbetrieb
- Bad Herrenalb, Landkreis Calw, Baden-Württemberg – Mineralheilbad, Heilklimatischer Kurort
- Bad Hersfeld, Landkreis Hersfeld-Rotenburg, Hessen – Heilbad
- Bad Hindelang, Landkreis Oberallgäu, Bayern – Kneippheilbad, Heilklimatischer Kurort
- Bad Holzhausen, Stadt Preußisch Oldendorf, Kreis Minden-Lübbecke, Nordrhein-Westfalen – Heilbad
- Bad Hönningen, Landkreis Neuwied, Rheinland-Pfalz – Thermal-Mineralheilbad
- Bad Homburg vor der Höhe, Hochtaunuskreis, Hessen – Heilbad
- Bad Hopfenberg, Stadt Petershagen, Kreis Minden-Lübbecke, Nordrhein-Westfalen – Moorheilbad
- Bad Iburg, Landkreis Osnabrück, Niedersachsen – Kneippkurort
- Bad Imnau, Stadt Haigerloch, Zollernalbkreis, Baden-Württemberg – Heilquellen-Kurbetrieb
- Bad Karlshafen, Landkreis Kassel, Hessen – Soleheilbad
- Bad Kissingen, Landkreis Bad Kissingen, Bayern – Heilquellen-Kurbetrieb, Moorheilbad
- Bad Klosterlausnitz, Saale-Holzland-Kreis, Thüringen - Moorheilbad
- Bad König, Odenwaldkreis, Hessen – Thermalheilbad
- Bad Königshofen im Grabfeld, Landkreis Rhön-Grabfeld, Bayern – Mineralheilbad
- Bad Kösen, Burgenlandkreis, Sachsen-Anhalt – Soleheilbad
- Bad Kötzting, Landkreis Cham, Bayern – Kneippheilbad
- Bad Kohlgrub, Landkreis Garmisch-Partenkirchen, Bayern – Moorheilbad
- Bad Kreuznach, Landkreis Bad Kreuznach, Rheinland-Pfalz – Mineralheilbad, Radonheilbad
- Bad Krozingen, Landkreis Breisgau-Hochschwarzwald, Baden-Württemberg – Mineral-Thermalheilbad
- Bad Laasphe, Kreis Siegen-Wittgenstein, Nordrhein-Westfalen – Kneippheilbad
- Bad Laer, Landkreis Osnabrück, Niedersachsen – Soleheilbad
- Bad Langensalza, Unstrut-Hainich-Kreis, Thüringen – Heilbad
- Bad Lausick, Landkreis Leipzig, Sachsen – Mineralheilbad
- Bad Lauterberg, Landkreis Osterode am Harz, Niedersachsen – Kneippheilbad
- Bad Liebenstein, Wartburgkreis, Thüringen – Mineralheilbad
- Bad Liebenwerda, Landkreis Elbe-Elster, Brandenburg – Moorheilbad
- Bad Liebenzell, Landkreis Calw, Baden-Württemberg – Heilbad
- Bad Lippspringe, Kreis Paderborn, Nordrhein-Westfalen – Heilbad, Heilklimatischer Kurort
- Bad Lobenstein, Saale-Orla-Kreis, Thüringen – Moorbad
- Bad Malente-Gremsmühlen, Gemeinde Malente, Kreis Ostholstein, Schleswig-Holstein – Kneippheilbad, Heilklimatischer Kurort
- Bad Marienberg (Westerwald), Westerwaldkreis, Rheinland-Pfalz – Kneippheilbad
- Bad Meinberg, Stadt Horn-Bad Meinberg, Kreis Lippe, Nordrhein-Westfalen – Heilbad
- Bad Mergentheim, Main-Tauber-Kreis, Baden-Württemberg – Mineralheilbad
- Bad Münder am Deister, Landkreis Hameln-Pyrmont, Niedersachsen – Ort mit Heilquellen-Kurbetrieb
- Bad Münster am Stein-Ebernburg, Landkreis Bad Kreuznach, Rheinland-Pfalz – Radonheilbad, Heilklimatischer Kurort
- Bad Münstereifel, Kreis Euskirchen, Nordrhein-Westfalen – Kneippheilbad
- Bad Muskau, Landkreis Görlitz, Sachsen – Ort mit Moorkurbetrieb
- Bad Nauheim, Wetteraukreis, Hessen – Thermal-Mineralbad
- Bad Nenndorf, Landkreis Schaumburg, Niedersachsen – Moorheilbad, Mineralheilbad
- Bad Neuenahr-Ahrweiler, Landkreis Ahrweiler, Rheinland-Pfalz – Mineralbad
- Bad Neustadt an der Saale, Landkreis Rhön-Grabfeld, Bayern – Solheilbad, Moorheilbad
- Bad Niedernau, Stadt Rottenburg am Neckar, Landkreis Tübingen, Baden-Württemberg – Mineralheilbad, Moorheilbad
- Bad Oeynhausen, Kreis Minden-Lübbecke, Nordrhein-Westfalen – Mineralheilbad
- Bad Orb, Main-Kinzig-Kreis, Hessen – Heilbad
- Bad Peterstal-Griesbach, Ortenaukreis, Baden-Württemberg – Mineralheilbad, Moorheilbad, Kneippkurort
- Bad Pyrmont, Landkreis Hameln-Pyrmont, Niedersachsen – Mineralheilbad, Moorheilbad
- Bad Rappenau, Landkreis Heilbronn, Baden-Württemberg – Soleheilbad
- Bad Reichenhall, Landkreis Berchtesgadener Land, Bayern – Soleheilbad
- Bad Rilchingen, Regionalverband Saarbrücken, Saarland - Thermalsole - Mineralbad
- Bad Rippoldsau-Schapbach, Landkreis Freudenstadt, Baden-Württemberg – Mineralbad, Moorbad
- Bad Rodach, Landkreis Coburg, Bayern – Heilbad
- Bad Rotenfels, Stadt Gaggenau, Landkreis Rastatt, Baden-Württemberg – Heilquellen-Kurbetrieb
- Bad Rothenfelde, Landkreis Osnabrück, Niedersachsen – Soleheilbad
- Bad Saarow, Gemeinde Bad Saarow-Pieskow, Landkreis Oder-Spree, Brandenburg – Thermalsoleheilbad, Moorheilbad
- Bad Sachsa, Landkreis Osterode am Harz, Niedersachsen – Heilklimatischer Kurort
- Bad Säckingen, Landkreis Waldshut, Baden-Württemberg – Heilbad
- Bad Salzdetfurth, Landkreis Hildesheim, Niedersachsen – Moorheilbad, Soleheilbad
- Bad Salzelmen, Stadt Schönebeck, Salzlandkreis, Sachsen-Anhalt – Soleheilbad
- Bad Salzhausen, Stadt Nidda, Wetteraukreis, Hessen – Heilbad
- Bad Salzig, Stadt Boppard, Rhein-Hunsrück-Kreis, Rheinland-Pfalz – Mineralheilbad
- Bad Salzschlirf, Landkreis Fulda, Hessen – Mineralheilbad, Moorheilbad
- Bad Salzuflen, Kreis Lippe, Nordrhein-Westfalen – Mineralheilbad
- Bad Salzungen, Wartburgkreis, Thüringen – Soleheilbad
- Bad Sassendorf, Kreis Soest, Nordrhein-Westfalen – Mineralheilbad, Moorheilbad
- Bad Saulgau, Landkreis Sigmaringen, Baden-Württemberg – Heilbad
- Bad Schandau, Landkreis Sächsische Schweiz-Osterzgebirge, Sachsen – Kneippkurort
- Bad Schlema, Erzgebirgskreis, Sachsen – Heilbad
- Bad Schmiedeberg, Landkreis Wittenberg, Sachsen-Anhalt – Moorheilbad, Mineralheilbad, Kneippkurort
- Bad Schönborn, Landkreis Karlsruhe, Baden-Württemberg – Heilbad
- Bad Schussenried, Landkreis Biberach, Baden-Württemberg – Moorheilbad
- Bad Schwalbach, Rheingau-Taunus-Kreis, Hessen – Mineralheilbad, Moorheilbad
- Bad Schwartau, Kreis Ostholstein, Schleswig-Holstein – Jodsoleheilbad, Moorheilbad
- Bad Sebastiansweiler, Stadt Mössingen, Landkreis Tübingen, Baden-Württemberg – Heilquellen-Kurbetrieb
- Bad Segeberg, Kreis Segeberg, Schleswig-Holstein – Mineralheilbad
- Bad Sobernheim, Landkreis Bad Kreuznach, Rheinland-Pfalz – Felkeheilbad
- Bad Soden am Taunus, Main-Taunus-Kreis, Hessen – Mineral-Soleheilbad
- Bad Soden-Salmünster, Main-Kinzig-Kreis, Hessen – Mineralheilbad
- Bad Sooden-Allendorf, Werra-Meißner-Kreis, Hessen – Soleheilbad
- Bad Staffelstein, Landkreis Lichtenfels, Bayern – Sole-Thermalbad
- Bad Steben, Landkreis Hof, Bayern – Heilbad
- Bad Suderode, Landkreis Harz, Sachsen-Anhalt – Heilbad
- Bad Sulza, Landkreis Weimarer Land, Thüringen – Soleheilbad
- Bad Sülze, Landkreis Vorpommern-Rügen, Mecklenburg-Vorpommern – Heilbad
- Bad Tabarz, Landkreis Gotha, Thüringen – Kneipp-Heilbad
- Bad Teinach, Stadt Bad Teinach-Zavelstein, Landkreis Calw, Baden-Württemberg – Heilbad
- Bad Tennstedt, Unstrut-Hainich-Kreis, Thüringen – Heilbad
- Bad Tölz, Landkreis Bad Tölz-Wolfratshausen, Bayern – Jodbad, Heilklimatischer Kurort
- Bad Überkingen, Landkreis Göppingen, Baden-Württemberg – Heilbad
- Bad Urach, Landkreis Reutlingen, Baden-Württemberg – Heilbad
- Bad Vilbel, Wetteraukreis, Hessen – Heilbad
- Bad Waldliesborn, Stadt Lippstadt, Kreis Soest, Nordrhein-Westfalen – Mineralheilbad
- Bad Waldsee, Landkreis Ravensburg, Baden-Württemberg – Moorheilbad, Kneippkurort
- Bad Weißenstadt, Landkreis Wunsiedel im Fichtelgebirge, Bayern – Heilbad
- Bad Westernkotten, Stadt Erwitte, Kreis Soest, Nordrhein-Westfalen – Soleheilbad, Moorheilbad
- Bad Wiessee, Bavaria – Mineralheilbad
- Bad Wildbad, Landkreis Calw, Baden-Württemberg – Thermalheilbad
- Bad Wildstein, Stadt Traben-Trarbach, Landkreis Bernkastel-Wittlich, Rheinland-Pfalz – Heilbad
- Bad Wildungen, Landkreis Waldeck-Frankenberg, Hessen – Mineralheilbad
- Bad Wilhelmshöhe, Stadt Kassel, Hessen – Thermalsoleheilbad, Kneippheilbad
- Bad Wilsnack, Landkreis Prignitz, Brandenburg – Moorheilbad
- Bad Wimpfen, Landkreis Heilbronn, Baden-Württemberg – Soleheilbad
- Bad Windsheim, Landkreis Neustadt an der Aisch-Bad Windsheim, Bayern – Soleheilbad, Mineralheilbad
- Bad Wörishofen, Landkreis Unterallgäu, Bayern – Kneippheilbad
- Bad Wünnenberg, Kreis Paderborn, Nordrhein-Westfalen – Kneippheilbad
- Bad Wurzach, Landkreis Ravensburg, Baden-Württemberg – Moorheilbad
- Bad Zwesten, Schwalm-Eder-Kreis, Hessen – Heilbad
- Bad Zwischenahn, Landkreis Ammerland, Niedersachsen – Moorheilbad
- Baden-Baden, Baden-Württemberg – Mineralheilbad
- Badenweiler, Landkreis Breisgau-Hochschwarzwald, Baden-Württemberg – Thermalheilbad
- Baltrum, Landkreis Aurich, Niedersachsen – Nordseeheilbad
- Bansin, Gemeinde Heringsdorf, Landkreis Vorpommern-Greifswald, Mecklenburg-Vorpommern – Ostseeheilbad
- Bayrischzell, Landkreis Miesbach, Bayern – Heilklimatischer Kurort
- Berchtesgaden, Landkreis Berchtesgadener Land, Bayern – Heilklimatischer Kurort
- Berg, Stadt Stuttgart, Baden-Württemberg – Heilquellen-Kurbetrieb
- Berggießhübel, Stadt Bad Gottleuba-Berggießhübel, Landkreis Sächsische Schweiz-Osterzgebirge, Sachsen – Kneippkurort
- Bernkastel-Kues, Landkreis Bernkastel-Wittlich, Rheinland-Pfalz – Heilklimatischer Kurort
- Beuren, Landkreis Esslingen, Baden-Württemberg – Erholungsort mit Heilquellen-Kurbetrieb
- Binz, Landkreis Vorpommern-Rügen, Mecklenburg-Vorpommern – Ostseebad
- Bischofsgrün, Landkreis Bayreuth, Bayern – Heilklimatischer Kurort
- Bischofswiesen, Landkreis Berchtesgadener Land, Bayern – Heilklimatischer Kurort
- Blankenburg, Unstrut-Hainich-Kreis, Thüringen – Heilbad
- Blieskastel, Saarpfalz-Kreis, Saarland – Kneippkurort
- Bodenmais, Landkreis Regen, Bayern – Heilklimatischer Kurort
- Boltenhagen, Mecklenburg-Vorpommern – Ostseeheilbad
- Borkum, Landkreis Leer, Niedersachsen – Nordseeheilbad
- Breege, Landkreis Vorpommern-Rügen, Mecklenburg-Vorpommern – Ostseebad
- Brilon, Hochsauerlandkreis, Nordrhein-Westfalen – Kneippkurort
- Buckow, Landkreis Märkisch-Oderland, Brandenburg – Kneippkurort
- Büsum, Kreis Dithmarschen, Schleswig-Holstein – Nordseeheilbad
- Burg auf Fehmarn, Stadt Fehmarn, Kreis Ostholstein, Schleswig-Holstein – Ostseeheilbad
- Burg (Spreewald), Landkreis Spree-Neiße, Brandenburg – Ort mit Heilquellenkurbetrieb
- Burhave, Gemeinde Butjadingen, Landkreis Wesermarsch, Niedersachsen – Nordseebad

== C ==
- Carolinensiel-Harlesiel, Stadt Wittmund, Landkreis Wittmund, Niedersachsen – Nordseebad
- Cuxhaven, Landkreis Cuxhaven, Niedersachsen – Nordseeheilbad

== D ==
- Dahme, Kreis Ostholstein, Schleswig-Holstein – Ostseeheilbad
- Damp, Kreis Rendsburg-Eckernförde, Schleswig-Holstein – Ostseebad
- Dangast, Stadt Varel, Landkreis Friesland, Niedersachsen – Nordseebad, Ort mit Heilquellen-Kurbetrieb
- Daun, Landkreis Vulkaneifel, Rheinland-Pfalz – Heilklimatischer Kurort, Kneippkurort, Mineralbad
- Dierhagen, Landkreis Vorpommern-Rügen, Mecklenburg-Vorpommern – Ostseeheilbad
- Dobel, Landkreis Calw, Baden-Württemberg – Heilklimatischer Kurort
- Dornumersiel, Gemeinde Dornum, Landkreis Aurich, Niedersachsen – Nordseebad

== E ==
- Eckenhagen, Gemeinde Reichshof, Oberbergischer Kreis, Nordrhein-Westfalen – Heilklimatischer Kurort
- Eckernförde, Kreis Rendsburg-Eckernförde, Schleswig-Holstein – Ostseebad
- Ehlscheid, Landkreis Neuwied, Rheinland-Pfalz – Heilklimatischer Kurort
- Bensersiel, Stadt Esens, Landkreis Wittmund, Niedersachsen – Nordseeheilbad
- Eutin, Kreis Ostholstein, Schleswig-Holstein – Heilklimatischer Kurort

== F ==
- Finsterbergen, Stadt Friedrichroda, Landkreis Gotha, Thüringen – Heilklimatischer Kurort
- Fischen im Allgäu, Landkreis Oberallgäu, Bayern – Heilklimatischer Kurort
- Freiburg im Breisgau, Baden-Württemberg Ortsbereich: An den Heilquellen – Ort mit Heilquellenkurbetrieb
- Freudenstadt, Landkreis Freudenstadt, Baden-Württemberg – Heilklimatischer Kurort, Kneippkurort
- Friedrichskoog, Kreis Dithmarschen, Schleswig-Holstein – Nordseeheilbad
- Füssen, Landkreis Ostallgäu, Bayern – Kneippkurort

== G ==
- Garmisch-Partenkirchen, Landkreis Garmisch-Partenkirchen, Bayern – Heilklimatischer Kurort
- Gelting, Kreis Schleswig-Flensburg, Schleswig-Holstein – Kneippkurort
- Gemünd (Schleiden), Stadt Schleiden, Kreis Euskirchen, Nordrhein-Westfalen – Kneippkurort
- Gersfeld (Rhön), Landkreis Fulda, Hessen – Kneippheilbad
- Gladenbach, Landkreis Marburg-Biedenkopf, Hessen – Kneippheilbad
- Glücksburg (Ostsee), Kreis Schleswig-Flensburg, Schleswig-Holstein – Ostseeheilbad
- Göhren, Landkreis Vorpommern-Rügen, Mecklenburg-Vorpommern – Ostseebad
- Graal-Müritz, Landkreis Rostock, Mecklenburg-Vorpommern – Ostseeheilbad
- Grafschaft, Stadt Schmallenberg, Hochsauerlandkreis, Nordrhein-Westfalen – Heilklimatischer Kurort
- Grasellenbach, Kreis Bergstraße, Hessen – Kneippheilbad
- Grömitz, Kreis Ostholstein, Schleswig-Holstein – Ostseeheilbad
- Großenbrode, Kreis Ostholstein, Schleswig-Holstein – Ostseeheilbad

== H ==
- Haffkrug, Gemeinde Scharbeutz, Kreis Ostholstein, Schleswig-Holstein – Ostseeheilbad
- Hahnenklee, Stadt Goslar, Landkreis Goslar, Niedersachsen – Heilklimatischer Kurort
- Hausberge, Stadt Porta Westfalica, Kreis Minden-Lübbecke, Nordrhein-Westfalen – Kneippkurort
- Heikendorf, Kreis Plön, Schleswig-Holstein – Ostseebad
- Heilbad Heiligenstadt, Landkreis Eichsfeld, Thüringen – Soleheilbad
- Heiligendamm, Stadt Bad Doberan, Landkreis Rostock, Mecklenburg-Vorpommern – Ostseeheilbad
- Heiligenhafen, Kreis Ostholstein, Schleswig-Holstein – Ostseeheilbad
- Helgoland, Kreis Pinneberg, Schleswig-Holstein – Nordseeheilbad
- Herbstein, Vogelsbergkreis, Hessen – Heilquellen-Kurbetrieb
- Heringsdorf, Landkreis Vorpommern-Greifswald, Mecklenburg-Vorpommern – Ostseeheilbad
- Hiddesen, Stadt Detmold Kreis Lippe, Nordrhein-Westfalen – Kneippkurort
- Hinterzarten, Landkreis Breisgau-Hochschwarzwald, Baden-Württemberg – Heilklimatischer Kurort
- Hitzacker, Landkreis Lüchow-Dannenberg, Niedersachsen – Kneippkurort
- Höchenschwand, Landkreis Waldshut, Baden-Württemberg – Heilklimatischer Kurort
- Hörnum (Sylt), Kreis Nordfriesland, Schleswig-Holstein – Nordseebad
- Hoheneck, Stadt Ludwigsburg, Landkreis Ludwigsburg, Baden-Württemberg – Heilquellen- Kurbetrieb
- Hohwacht (Ostsee), Kreis Plön, Schleswig-Holstein – Ostseeheilbad
- Holm, Stadt Schönberg (Holstein), Kreis Plön, Schleswig-Holstein – Heilbad
- Hopfen am See, Stadt Füssen, Landkreis Ostallgäu, Bayern – Kneippkurort
- Horumersiel-Schillig, Gemeinde Wangerland, Landkreis Friesland, Niedersachsen – Nordseeheilbad

== I ==
- Insel Hiddensee, Landkreis Vorpommern-Rügen, Mecklenburg-Vorpommern – Ostseebad
- Insel Poel, Landkreis Nordwestmecklenburg, Mecklenburg-Vorpommern – Ostseebad
- Isny im Allgäu, Landkreis Ravensburg, Baden-Württemberg – Heilklimatischer Kurort

== J ==
- Jordanbad, Stadt Biberach an der Riß, Landkreis Biberach, Baden-Württemberg – Kneippkurort
- Juist, Landkreis Aurich, Niedersachsen – Nordseeheilbad

== K ==
- Kampen (Sylt), Kreis Nordfriesland, Schleswig-Holstein – Nordseebad
- Karlshagen, Landkreis Vorpommern-Greifswald, Mecklenburg-Vorpommern – Ostseebad
- Kellberg, Gemeinde Thyrnau, Landkreis Passau, Bayern – Mineralquellen-Kurbetrieb
- Kellenhusen (Ostsee), Kreis Ostholstein, Schleswig-Holstein – Ostseeheilbad
- Kleve, Kreis Kleve, North Rhine-Westphalia – Mineralquelle-Kurhotel
- Königsfeld im Schwarzwald, Schwarzwald-Baar-Kreis, Baden-Württemberg – Heilklimatischer Kurort, Kneippkurort
- Königstein im Taunus, Hochtaunuskreis, Hessen – Heilklimatischer Kurort
- Koserow, Landkreis Vorpommern-Greifswald, Mecklenburg-Vorpommern – Ostseebad
- Kreuth, Landkreis Miesbach, Bayern – Heilklimatischer Kurort
- Krumbad, Stadt Krumbach (Schwaben), Landkreis Günzburg, Bayern – Peloid-Kurbetrieb + Kneippkurbetrieb
- Kühlungsborn, Landkreis Rostock, Mecklenburg-Vorpommern – Ostseeheilbad
- Kyllburg, Eifelkreis Bitburg-Prüm, Rheinland-Pfalz – Kneippkurort

== L ==
- Ostseebad Laboe, Kreis Plön, Schleswig-Holstein – Ostseebad
- Lahnstein, Rhein-Lahn-Kreis, Rheinland-Pfalz – Heiquellen-Kurbetrieb
- Langeoog, Landkreis Wittmund, Niedersachsen – Nordseeheilbad
- Lenzkirch, Landkreis Breisgau-Hochschwarzwald, Baden-Württemberg – Heilklimatischer Kurort
- Liegau-Augustusbad - Heiquellen
- Lindenfels, Kreis Bergstraße, Hessen – Heilklimatischer Kurort
- List (Sylt), Kreis Nordfriesland, Schleswig-Holstein – Nordseebad
- Loddin, Landkreis Vorpommern-Greifswald, Mecklenburg-Vorpommern – Ostseebad
- Lubmin, Landkreis Vorpommern-Greifswald, Mecklenburg-Vorpommern – Ostseebad

== M ==
- Manderscheid, Landkreis Bernkastel-Wittlich, Rheinland-Pfalz – Heilklimatischer Kurort, Kneippkurort
- Marktschellenberg, Landkreis Berchtesgadener Land, Bayern – Heilklimatischer Kurort
- Masserberg, Landkreis Hildburghausen, Thüringen – Heilklimatischer Kurort
- Mettnau, Stadt Radolfzell, Landkreis Konstanz, Baden-Württemberg – Kneippkurort
- Mölln, Kreis Herzogtum Lauenburg, Schleswig-Holstein – Kneippkurort
- Murnau am Staffelsee, Landkreis Garmisch-Partenkirchen, Bayern – Moor-Kurbetrieb

== N ==
- Naumburg (Hessen), Landkreis Kassel, Hessen – Kneippkurort
- Nebel, Kreis Nordfriesland, Schleswig-Holstein – Nordseebad
- Neubulach, Landkreis Calw, Baden-Württemberg – Heilklimatischer Kurort, Heilstollenkurbetrieb
- Neuharlingersiel, Landkreis Wittmund, Niedersachsen – Nordseeheilbad
- Neukirchen (Knüll), Schwalm-Eder-Kreis, Hessen – Kneippheilbad
- Neustadt in Holstein, Kreis Ostholstein, Schleswig-Holstein – Ostseebad
- Nieblum, Kreis Nordfriesland, Schleswig-Holstein – Nordseebad
- Nieheim, Kreis Höxter, Nordrhein-Westfalen – Heilklimatischer Kurort
- Niendorf (Ostsee), Timmendorfer Strand, Kreis Ostholstein, Schleswig-Holstein – Ostseeheilbad
- Nienhagen, Landkreis Rostock, Mecklenburg-Vorpommern – Ostseebad
- Nonnweiler, Landkreis Sankt Wendel, Saarland – Heilklimatischer Kurort
- Norddeich, Stadt Norden, Landkreis Aurich, Niedersachsen – Nordseeheilbad
- Norddorf auf Amrum, Kreis Nordfriesland, Schleswig-Holstein – Nordseeheilbad
- Norderney, Landkreis Aurich, Niedersachsen – Nordseeheilbad
- Nordstrand, Kreis Nordfriesland, Schleswig-Holstein – Nordseeheilbad
- Nümbrecht, Oberbergischer Kreis, Nordrhein-Westfalen – Heilklimatischer Kurort

== O ==
- Oberstaufen, Landkreis Oberallgäu, Bayern – Heilklimatischer Kurort, Schroth-Heilbad
- Oberstdorf, Landkreis Oberallgäu, Bayern – Heilklimatischer Kurort, Kneippkurort
- Obertal-Buhlbach, Gemeinde Baiersbronn, Landkreis Freudenstadt, Baden-Württemberg – Heilklimatischer Kurort
- Olsberg, Hochsauerlandkreis, Nordrhein-Westfalen – Kneippkurort
- Orscholz, Gemeinde Mettlach, Landkreis Merzig-Wadern, Saarland – Heilklimatischer Kurort
- Otterndorf, Landkreis Cuxhaven, Samtgemeinde Hadeln, Niedersachsen, Nordseebad
- Ottobeuren, Landkreis Unterallgäu, Bayern – Kneippkurort
- Oy-Mittelberg, Landkreis Oberallgäu, Bayern – Kneippkurort

== P ==
- Pellworm, Kreis Nordfriesland, Schleswig-Holstein – Nordseeheilbad
- Prerow, Landkreis Vorpommern-Rügen, Mecklenburg-Vorpommern – Ostseebad
- Prien am Chiemsee, Landkreis Rosenheim, Bayern – Kneippkurort

== R ==
- Ramsau bei Berchtesgaden, Landkreis Berchtesgadener Land, Bayern – Heilklimatischer Kurort
- Randringhausen, Stadt Bünde, Kreis Herford, Nordrhein-Westfalen – Erholungsort mit Kurmittelgebiet
- Rantum (Sylt), Kreis Nordfriesland, Schleswig-Holstein – Nordseebad
- Bad Reinhardshausen, Stadt Bad Wildungen, Landkreis Waldeck-Frankenberg, Hessen – Mineralheilbad
- Rengsdorf, Landkreis Neuwied, Rheinland-Pfalz – Heilklimatischer Kurort
- Rerik, Landkreis Rostock, Mecklenburg-Vorpommern – Ostseebad
- Rothenuffeln, Gemeinde Hille, Kreis Minden-Lübbecke, Nordrhein-Westfalen – Erholungsort mit Kurmittelgebiet
- Rottach-Egern, Landkreis Miesbach, Bayern – Heilklimatischer Kurort

== S ==
- Saig, Gemeinde Lenzkirch, Landkreis Breisgau-Hochschwarzwald, Baden-Württemberg – Heilklimatischer Kurort
- Salzgitter-Bad, Stadt Salzgitter, Niedersachsen – Ort mit Sole-Kurbetrieb
- Sasbachwalden, Ortenaukreis, Baden-Württemberg – Heilklimatischer Kurort, Kneippkurort
- Scharbeutz, Kreis Ostholstein, Schleswig-Holstein – Ostseeheilbad
- Scheidegg, Landkreis Lindau (Bodensee), Bayern – Heilklimatischer Kurort, Kneippkurort
- Schieder, Stadt Schieder-Schwalenberg, Kreis Lippe, Nordrhein-Westfalen – Kneippkurort
- Schlangenbad, Rheingau-Taunus-Kreis, Hessen – Heilbad
- Schluchsee, Landkreis Breisgau-Hochschwarzwald, Baden-Württemberg – Heilklimatischer Kurort
- Schömberg, Landkreis Calw, Baden-Württemberg – Heilklimatischer Kurort, Kneippkurort im Schwarzwald
- Schönau am Königssee, Landkreis Berchtesgadener Land, Bayern – Heilklimatischer Kurort
- Schönberg (Holstein), Kreis Plön, Schleswig-Holstein – Ostseebad
- Schönhagen, Gemeinde Brodersby, Kreis Rendsburg-Eckernförde, Schleswig-Holstein – Ostseebad
- Schönmünzach-Schwarzenberg, Gemeinde Baiersbronn, Landkreis Freudenstadt, Baden-Württemberg – Kneippkurort
- Schönwald im Schwarzwald, Schwarzwald-Baar-Kreis, Baden-Württemberg – Heilklimatischer Kurort
- Schwangau, Landkreis Ostallgäu, Bayern – Heilklimatischer Kurort
- Seebruch, Stadt Vlotho, Kreis Herford, Nordrhein-Westfalen – Luftkurort mit Kurmittelgebiet
- Sellin, Landkreis Vorpommern-Rügen, Mecklenburg-Vorpommern – Ostseebad
- Senkelteich, Stadt Vlotho, Kreis Herford, Nordrhein-Westfalen – Luftkurort mit Kurmittelgebiet
- Sibyllenbad, Marktgemeinde Bad Neualbenreuth, Landkreis Tirschenreuth, Bayern – Heilquellen-Kurbetrieb
- Siegsdorf, Landkreis Traunstein, Bayern – Heilquellenkurbetrieb
- Sierksdorf, Kreis Ostholstein, Schleswig-Holstein – Ostseebad
- Sohl, Stadt Bad Elster, Vogtlandkreis, Sachsen – Mineral- und Moorheilbad
- Soltau, Landkreis Heidekreis, Niedersachsen – Ort mit Sole-Kurbetrieb
- Spiekeroog, Landkreis Wittmund, Niedersachsen – Nordseeheilbad
- St. Blasien, Landkreis Waldshut, Baden-Württemberg – Heilklimatischer Kurort, Kneippkurort
- Sankt Peter-Ording, Kreis Nordfriesland, Schleswig-Holstein – Nordseeheilbad, Schwefelbad
- Strande, Kreis Rendsburg-Eckernförde, Schleswig-Holstein – Ostseebad
- Stützerbach, Ilm-Kreis, Thüringen – Kneippkurort
- Sülzhayn, Stadt Ellrich, Landkreis Nordhausen, Thüringen – Heilklimatischer Kurort
- Sylt-Ost, Kreis Nordfriesland, Schleswig-Holstein – Seebad

== T ==
- Tecklenburg, Kreis Steinfurt, Nordrhein-Westfalen – Kneippkurort
- Tegernsee, Landkreis Miesbach, Bayern – Heilklimatischer Kurort
- Templin, Landkreis Uckermark, Brandenburg – Thermalsoleheilbad
- Thiessow, Landkreis Vorpommern-Rügen, Mecklenburg-Vorpommern – Ostseebad
- Timmendorfer Strand, Kreis Ostholstein, Schleswig-Holstein – Ostseeheilbad
- Titisee-Neustadt, Landkreis Breisgau-Hochschwarzwald, Baden-Württemberg – Heilklimatischer Kurort
- Todtmoos, Landkreis Waldshut, Baden-Württemberg – Heilklimatischer Kurort
- Tossens, Gemeinde Butjadingen, Landkreis Wesermarsch, Niedersachsen – Nordseebad
- Trassenheide, Landkreis Vorpommern-Greifswald, Mecklenburg-Vorpommern – Ostseebad
- Travemünde, Stadt Lübeck, Schleswig-Holstein – Ostseeheilbad
- Treuchtlingen, Landkreis Weißenburg-Gunzenhausen, Bayern – Heilquellen-Kurbetrieb
- Triberg im Schwarzwald, Schwarzwald-Baar-Kreis, Baden-Württemberg – Heilklimatischer Kurort

== U ==
- Überlingen, Bodenseekreis, Baden-Württemberg – Kneippheilbad
- Ückeritz, Landkreis Vorpommern-Greifswald, Mecklenburg-Vorpommern – Ostseebad
- Ueckermünde, Landkreis Vorpommern-Greifswald, Mecklenburg-Vorpommern – Seebad
- Usseln, Gemeinde Willingen (Upland), Landkreis Waldeck-Frankenberg, Hessen – Heilklimatischer Kurort
- Utersum, Kreis Nordfriesland, Schleswig-Holstein – Nordseebad

== V ==
- Vallendar, Landkreis Mayen-Koblenz, Rheinland-Pfalz – Kneippkurort
- Villingen, Stadt Villingen-Schwenningen, Schwarzwald-Baar-Kreis, Baden-Württemberg – Kneippkurort

== W ==
- Waldbronn, Landkreis Karlsruhe, Baden-Württemberg – Heilquellen-Kurbetrieb
- Wangerooge, Landkreis Friesland, Niedersachsen – Nordseeheilbad
- Waren (Müritz), Landkreis Mecklenburgische Seenplatte, Mecklenburg-Vorpommern - Soleheilbad
- Warmbad, Stadt Wolkenstein, Erzgebirgskreis, Sachsen – Ort mit Heilquellenkurbetrieb
- Warnemünde, Stadt Rostock, Mecklenburg-Vorpommern – Ostseebad
- Weiskirchen, Landkreis Merzig-Wadern, Saarland – Heilklimatischer Kurort, Kneippkurort
- Weissenhäuser Strand, Wangels, Kreis Ostholstein, Schleswig-Holstein – Ostseebad
- Wenningstedt-Braderup (Sylt), Kreis Nordfriesland, Schleswig-Holstein – Nordseeheilbad
- Westerland, Kreis Nordfriesland, Schleswig-Holstein – Nordseeheilbad
- Wiesbaden, Hessen – Mineralbad
- Wiesenbad, Gemeinde Thermalbad Wiesenbad, Erzgebirgskreis, Sachsen (Ort mit Heilquellenkurbetrieb)
- Willingen (Upland), Landkreis Waldeck-Frankenberg, Hessen – Kneippheilbad
- Winterberg, Hochsauerlandkreis, Nordrhein-Westfalen – Heilklimatischer Kurort
- Wittdün auf Amrum, Kreis Nordfriesland, Schleswig-Holstein – Nordseeheilbad
- Wolfegg, Landkreis Ravensburg, Baden-Württemberg – Heilklimatischer Kurort
- Wremen, Landkreis Cuxhaven, Niedersachsen – Nordseebad
- Wustrow, Landkreis Vorpommern-Rügen, Mecklenburg-Vorpommern – Ostseeheilbad
- Wyk auf Föhr, Kreis Nordfriesland, Schleswig-Holstein – Nordseeheilbad

== Z ==
- Zempin, Landkreis Vorpommern-Greifswald, Mecklenburg-Vorpommern – Ostseebad
- Ziegenhagen, Stadt Witzenhausen, Werra-Meißner-Kreis, Hessen – Kneippkurort
- Zingst, Landkreis Vorpommern-Rügen, Mecklenburg-Vorpommern – Seeheilbad
- Zinnowitz, Landkreis Vorpommern-Greifswald, Mecklenburg-Vorpommern – Ostseeheilbad

== See also ==
- Tourism in Germany
- List of spa towns
