= Achterwasser =

Lagoon forming a bay on the Peenestrom river, Germany

Coordinates: 54°0′3″N 13°58′17″E

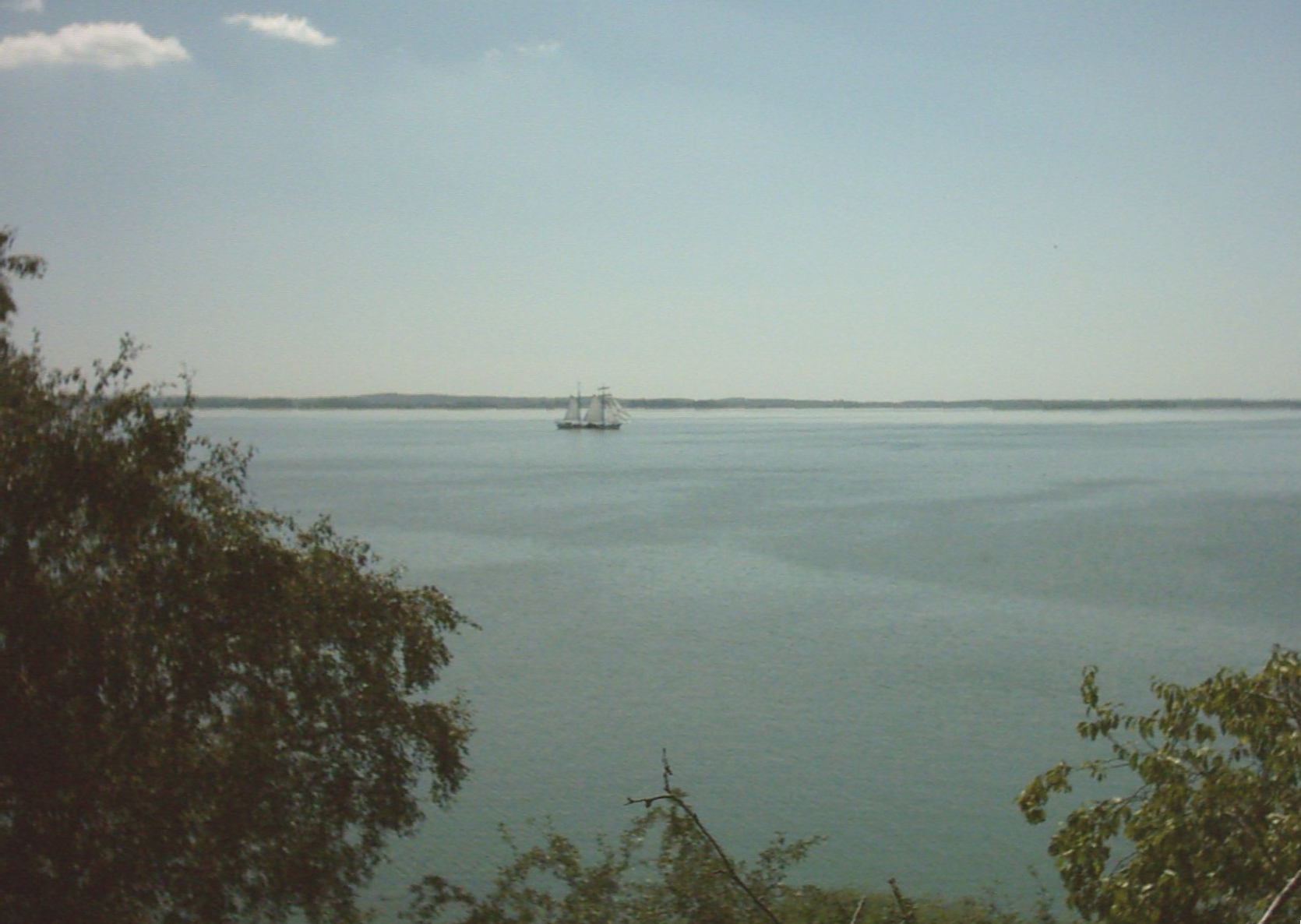
The Achterwasser off the Loddiner Höft

The Achterwasser (Low German achtern = "rear, behind") is a lagoon forming a bay on the Peenestrom river, which flows into the Baltic Sea. This lagoon extends so far into the island of Usedom, that it is only separated from the Baltic Sea by a narrow barrier spit between Ückeritz and Zinnowitz. It is bordered to the north by the peninsula of Gnitz and to the south by the Lieper Winkel. The reed-lined south-eastern bay is called the Balmer See, and the one to the southwest, which can only be accessed with difficulty on its western shore, is the Krienker See.

In past centuries the barrier protecting the lagoon was sometimes breached by the Baltic Sea during storm surges that flooded across the island of Usedom, when the narrowest part of the land bridge between Zempin and Koserow at Rieckgraben (near Lüttenort) was flooded. This land bridge between the Achterwasser and the Baltic Sea is only 300 metres wide.

The Achterwasser is not very deep, and is a popular surfing and sailing area. The beach sand on the Achterwasser on the peninsula of Gnitz is not as fine-grained as that on the Baltic Sea beach of Usedom. The bottom of the Achterwasser is very stony.

On some maps from medieval and early modern times, the lagoon is named as "Lassansches Water" or as plural "Lassansche Waters“. The description is related to the town of Lassan, which as the only town on the Achterwasser possessed the fishing rights for the waters.

== Villages and geographical features on the Achterwasser ==
- Lieper Winkel
- Krienker See (bay) and former Dewicho Manor House (Rittergut Dewichow) on its eastern shore
- Balmer See - bay
- Ückeritz - southern edge
- Loddin and Loddiner Höft
- Koserow- southern edge
- Zempin - southern edge
- Peninsula of Gnitz / Lütow

== Gallery ==
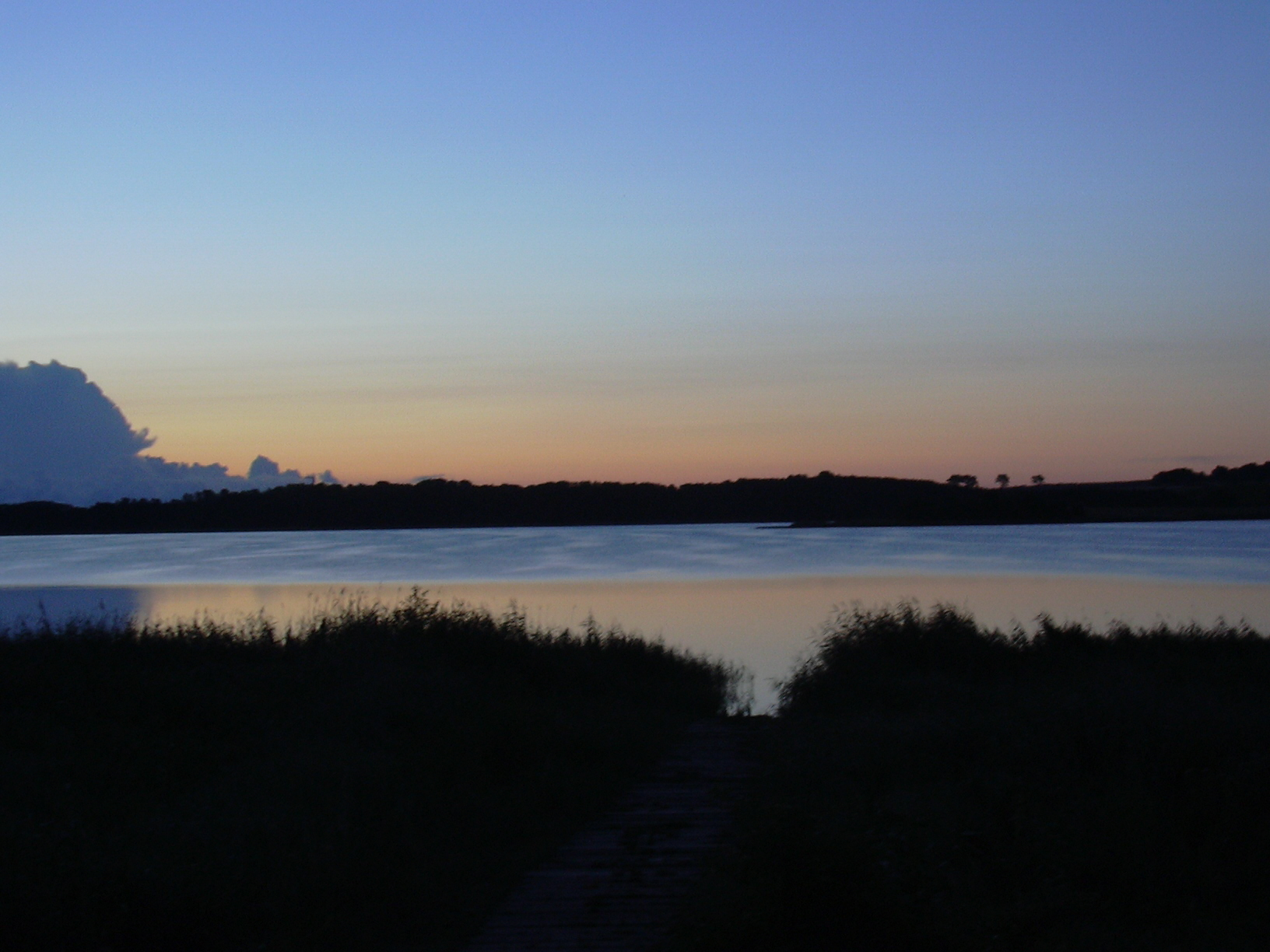
Sunrise on the Balmer See

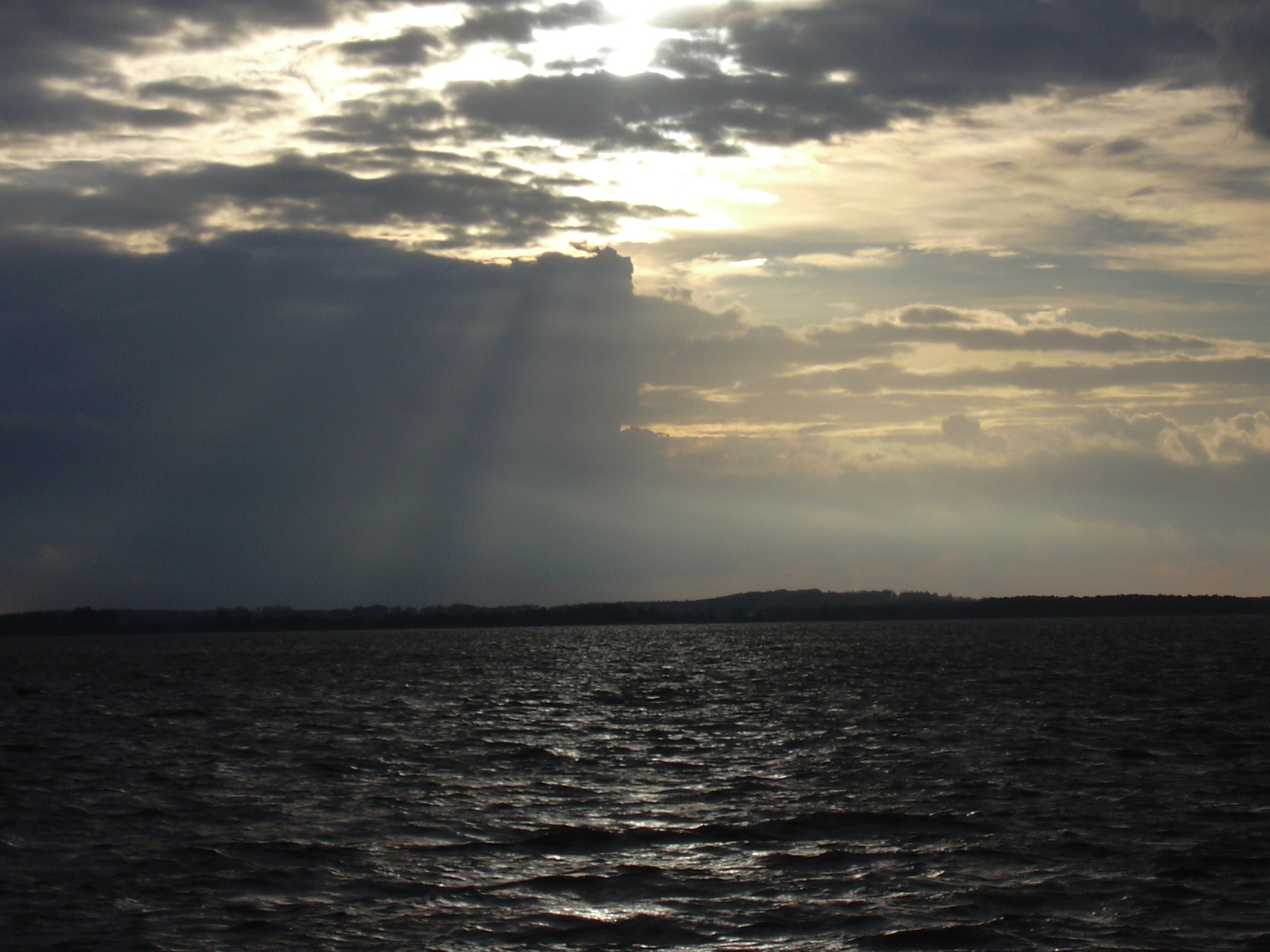
On the Achterwasser off Loddin after rain and storm

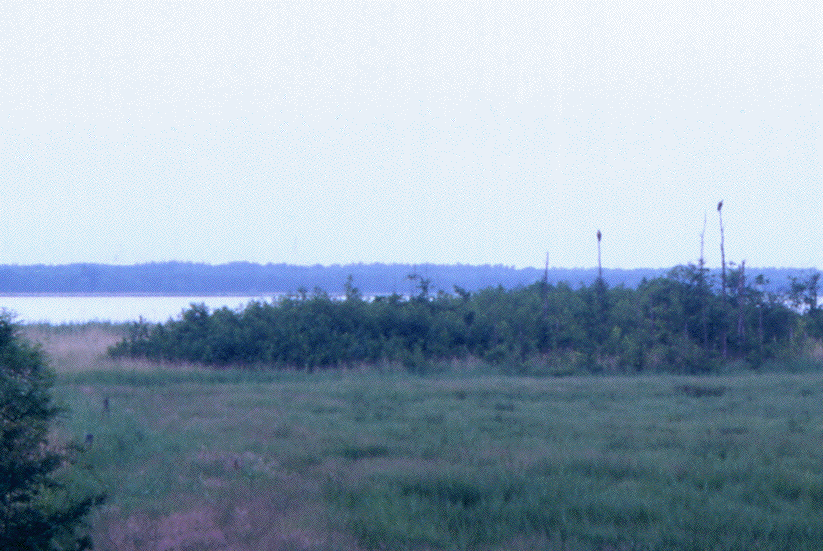
White-tailed eagles resting on dead trees by the shore in the Lieper Winkel
