= B-111 =

B-111 may refer to:

- FB-111A, the bomber variant of the F-111 Aardvark
- Bundesstraße 111, a road in Germany
