= Koserow =

- Municipality
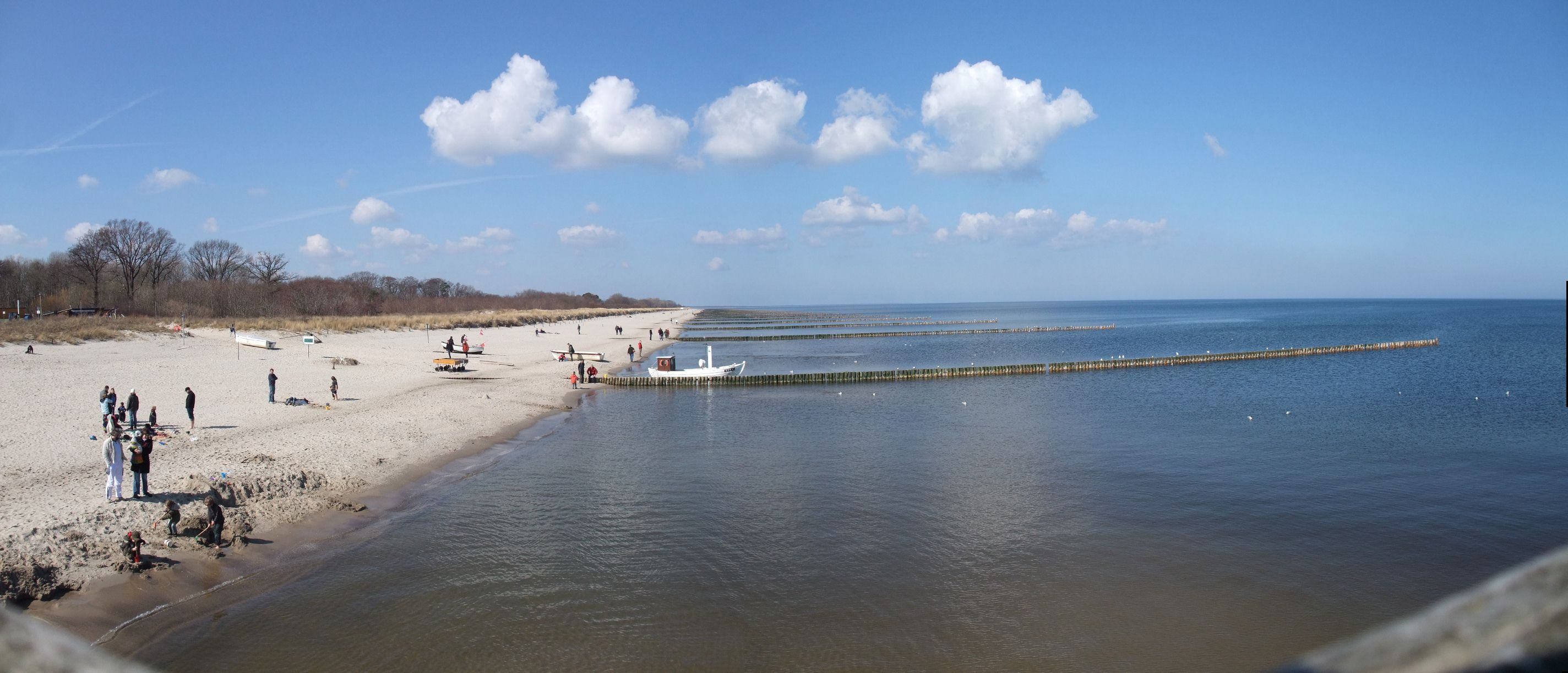
- Koserow Beach seen from the pier

- Location of Koserow within Vorpommern-Greifswald district
- Interactive map of Koserow
- Location within Germany Location within Mecklenburg-Vorpommern
- Coordinates: 54°3′N 14°0′E
- Country: Germany
- State: Mecklenburg-Vorpommern
- District: Vorpommern-Greifswald
- Municipal assoc.: Usedom-Süd

Government
  - Mayor: René König

Area
  - Total: 6.04 km^{2} (2.33 sq mi)
- Elevation: 0 m (0 ft)

Population (2025-12-31)
  - Total: 1,522
  - Density: 252/km^{2} (653/sq mi)
- Time zone: UTC+01:00 (CET)
  - Summer (DST): UTC+02:00 (CEST)
- Postal codes: 17459
- Dialling codes: 038375
- Vehicle registration: VG

Koserow is a municipality on Usedom Island, in the Vorpommern-Greifswald district, in Mecklenburg-Vorpommern, Germany.

A small coastal bathing resort, Koserow lies on an isthmus on the island of Usedom on the Baltic Sea, near the border with Poland. It is located within the Usedom Nature Park and is one of the four so-called Amber Spas on the island, connected by a 12 km long fine sandy beach called Amber Beach. The other three amber spas are Loddin, Ückeritz and Zempin.

As of 2013, Koserow had a population of 1,656.

== History ==
Koserow was first mentioned in the records in 1347 as Cuzerowe (Slavic for "goat" or "blackbird") and is one of the oldest settlements of Wendish origin on the island of Usedom. Koserow church is even older - already in existence by the end of the 13th century; it was built of field stones, has many treasures and is reportedly the oldest church on Usedom's Baltic Sea coast.

The history of the village is steeped in legend and even the dreaded pirate, Klaus Störtebeker, reputedly found a secret hiding place in the caves of Streckelsberg.

The village was sacked during the Thirty Years War and the church bell taken. After the Treaty of Stockholm on 1 February 1720, the island of Usedom and Koserow fell into Prussian possession. After the administrative reform in 1815, Koserow became part to the Prussian province of Pomerania and from 1818 to 1945 was part of the district of Usedom-Wollin.

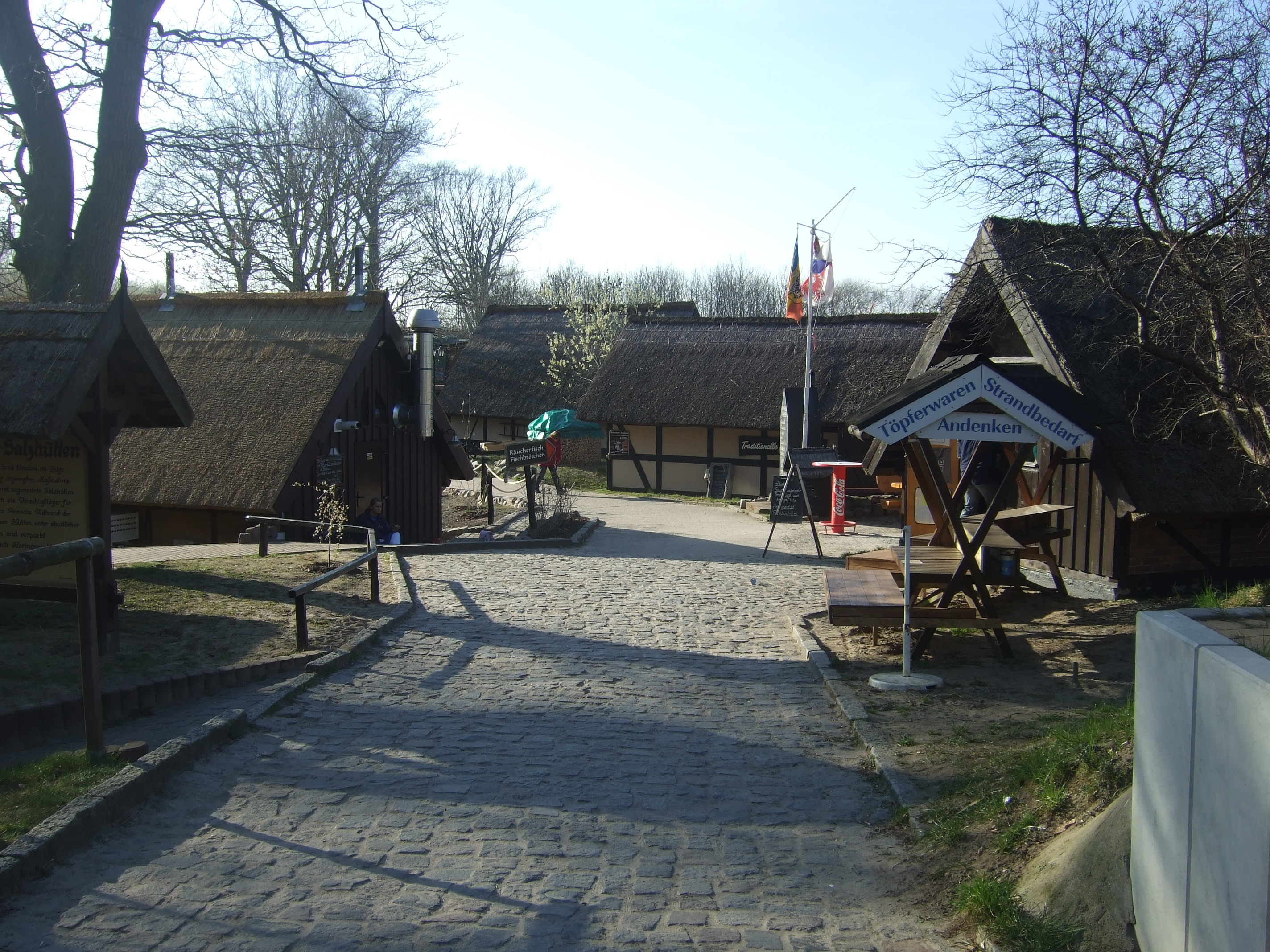
Salt cabins in Koserow

In 1820, the first salt huts were built to preserve the fish caught. Koserow at that time was one of the poorest communities on Usedom. Seaside tourists first began to arrive on foot, by coach or by sailing boat in 1846. Several storm floods hit the area in 1872 and 1874, worsening the economic situation.

For centuries, the economy of the village had been based on fishing and agriculture. Its growth as a resort was slow due to its poor communications, but it took off once the railway reached the island of Usedom in the early 1900s and a network of metal roads was built. Lidos were established for men, women and families and a pier was built. During World War II, the pier was destroyed during an icy winter. Since 1993, the community has once again had a new pier.

Koserow first received a railway connection on 1 June 1911. The town began to flourish as a seaside resort after the construction of the Prussian Northern Railway.

== Geography ==
Local map showing the isthmus Koserow is located on.

Koserow is located at the narrowest point of the isthmus between Nord and Südusedom directly on the B 111, amidst a scenic region between the Baltic Sea and the backwaters. The village is on the slopes of Streckelsberg (about 60 metres (200 ft) above sea level). It is located about 16 kilometres (9.9 mi) east of the seaside resort of Ahlbeck and 6 kilometres (3.7 mi) west of Zinnowitz.

The Koserow shoal lies offshore at a depth of at least 1.75 fathoms. It is about 1 mile N.N.E. of Streckelsberg. Depths of 3.5 to 4.75 fathoms separate the Koserow and Vineta shoals. It is demarcated by a white beacon buoy marked "Koserowbank O." off the shoal's eastern side. Another offshore feature is Koserow Steingrund, a large rock, measuring 1,800 ft (550 m) in length and 600 ft (180 m) in width. It is aligned in an east–west direction and is demarcated by a white spar buoy, marked "Koserow Steingrund N.".

== Administration ==
Koserow's logo

Until 2005 Koserow was the administrative seat of the sub-district (Amt) of Usedom-Mitte. Today it is managed by the Amt of Usedom-Süd which is based in the town of Usedom. The mayor (Bürgermeister) is Herr René König. The Federal Maritime and Hydrographic Agency of Germany operates a station at Koserow.

=== Coat of arms ===
Koserow has a logo but no official coat-of-arms.

== Culture ==
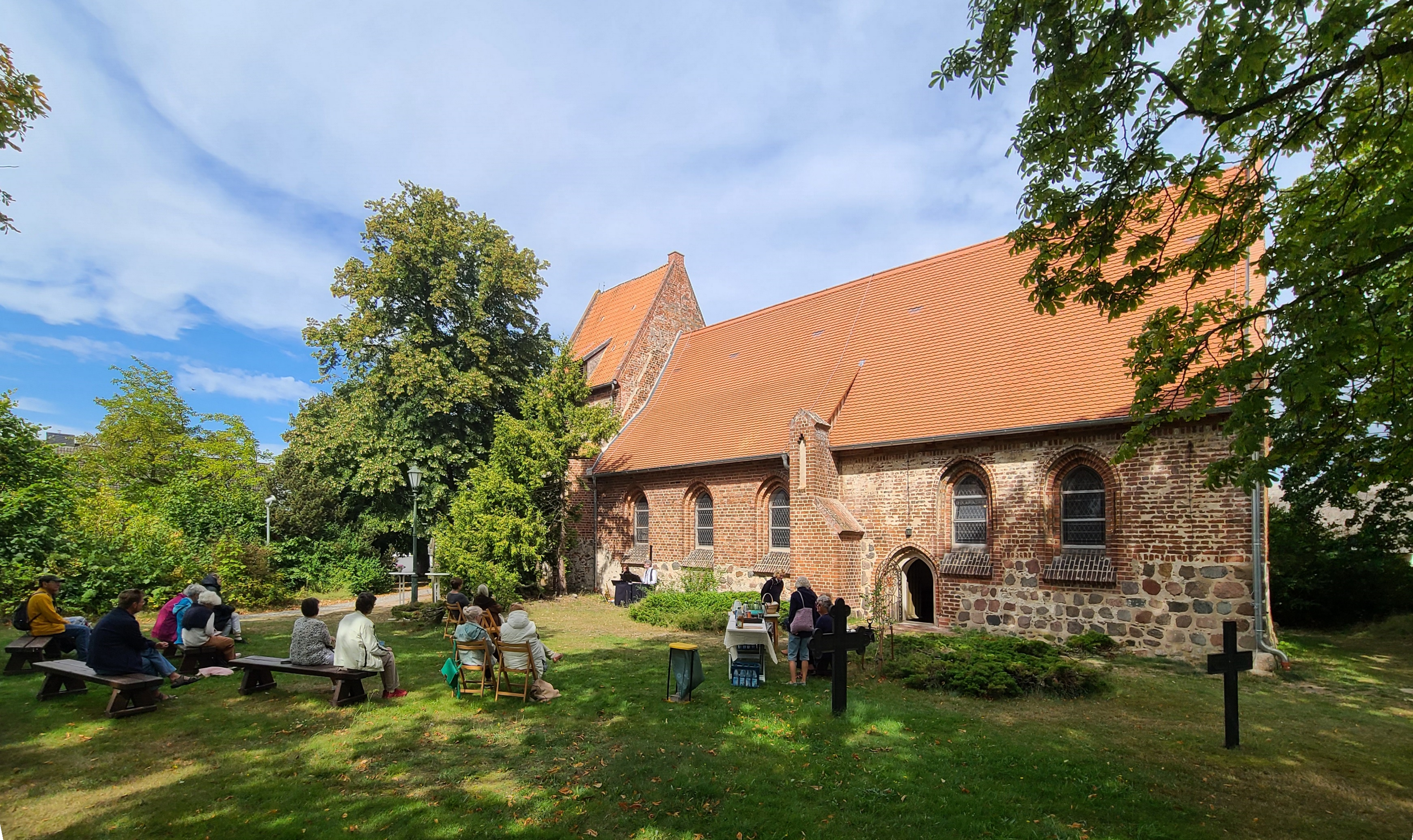
Koserow church

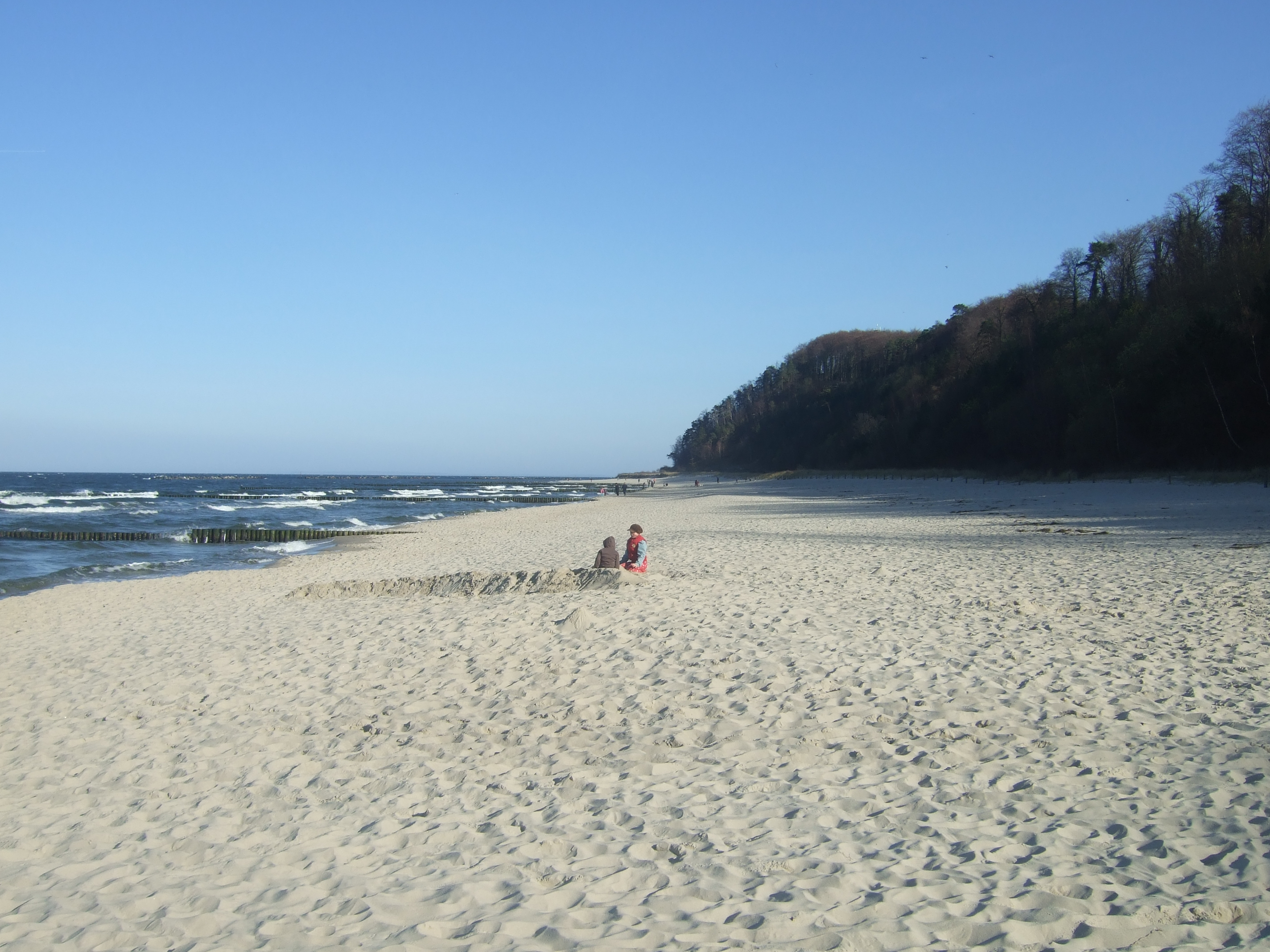
Amber Beach in Koserow, steep coast section called "Streckelsberg" in the background.

=== Recreation ===
Koserow is one of four Amber Spas towns, along with Zempin, Loddin, and Ückeritz. All are located at the narrowest part of the island. They share a 12 km long fine sandy beach called Amber Beach. The overall continuous beach area of the Baltic Usedom Island is 42 km, making it the longest sandy beach in all of Europe.

In 1993, Koserow was recognised as a "nationally certified resort". As a seaside resort, it offers a variety of recreational activities including swimming, sailing, surfing, walking and cycling.

=== Places of interest ===
The Village Church (Dorfkirche) stands almost hidden behind chestnut trees and surrounded by a wall of glacial erratic boulders in Fischerstraße. It is the only medieval church on Usedom's Baltic coast and has several interesting architectural features. The original stonework of the 13th-century building can still be seen in the centre section of the north wall with small early Gothic window openings and the plain triple-stepped arch of the old entrance. Expanded in the 15th century with a tower and sanctuary, it also has elements of High Gothic architecture. One particular treasure is the medieval winged altar, richly decorated with carved figures. It is the last, complete, surviving one of its kind on the island of Usedom. The unusually large crucifix, which was rescued from the sea by fishermen, has been christened by locals as the Vineta Cross. It dates to the 15th century and was made in Scandinavia. The German theologian, Wilhelm Meinhold was appointed minister at Koserow in the early 1820s.

The Nature Park is located at the end of Hauptstraße.

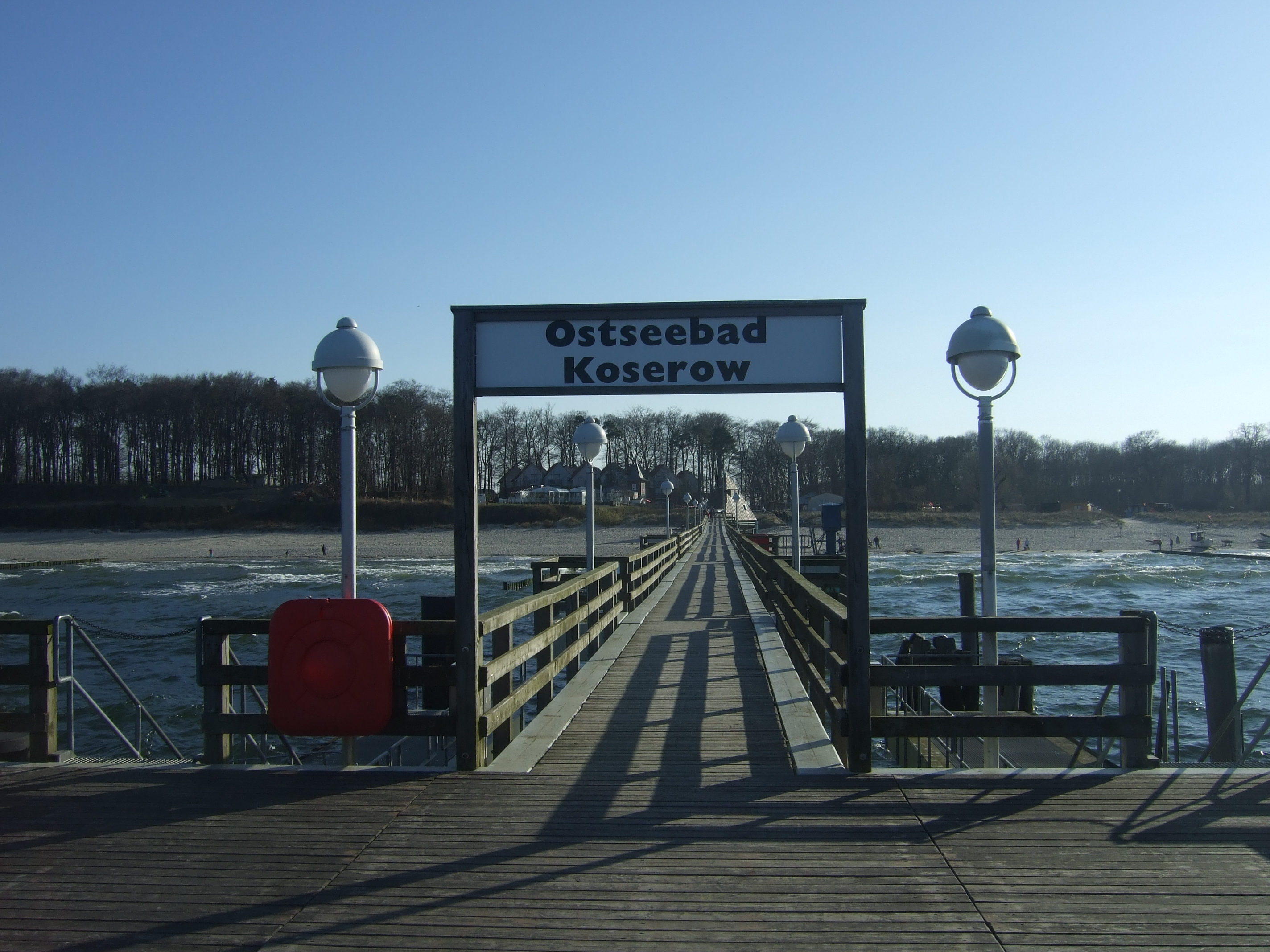
The pier

The Koserow Salt Huts are timber-framed and were built around 1820. They were used as storage for rock salt and for salting and packing the herring caught by local fishermen into large wooden barrels. The salted fish was a staple diet for the poor villagers during the winter months. Destroyed in the storm surges of 1872 and 1874, they were rebuilt around 1900. The remaining 15 huts are protected and, today, one of them is a museum open from May to September.

Koserow Pier juts out 261 metres (856 ft) into the sea near the salt huts and is a good place to enjoy the views and the seaside atmosphere. Excursion boats call at its landing stage.

The Streckelsberg (60 metres (200 ft)) is a steep coastal bluff and the highest elevation on the coast of Usedom. It offers wonderful views over the sea and, in clear weather, the hills of Mönchgut on the island of Rügen can be seen. To the northwest can be seen the island of Oie, recognisable at dusk by the lights of its lighthouse. To the southwest is the neighbouring island of Wolin.

=== Notable people ===
Johannes Wilhelm Meinhold (1797 – 1851) was a Pomeranian priest and author. After his theological education, he was priest in Koserow on Usedom from 1821 until 1827.

== Transport ==
Koserow is connected with a main road, the Bundesstraße 111. It can be reached with the Usedom island railway. It is also served by the Ducherow-Heringsdorf-Wolgast ferry. There are regular flights to nearby Heringsdorf Airport on Usedom.
