= Zempin =

- Municipality
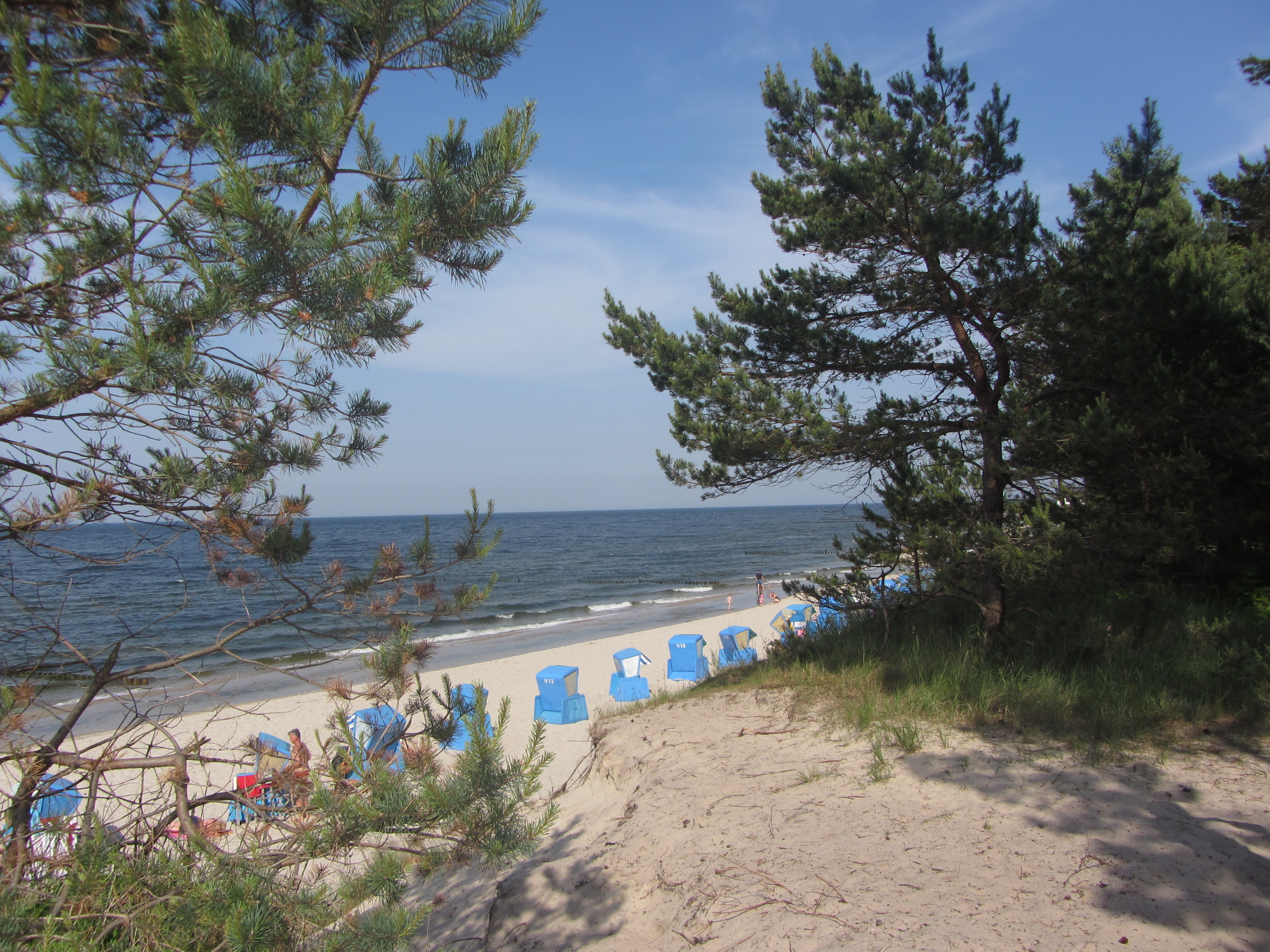
- Amber Beach in Zempin

- Coat of arms

- Location of Zempin within Vorpommern-Greifswald district
- Interactive map of Zempin
- Location within Germany Location within Mecklenburg-Vorpommern
- Coordinates: 54°04′N 13°58′E
- Country: Germany
- State: Mecklenburg-Vorpommern
- District: Vorpommern-Greifswald
- Municipal assoc.: Usedom-Süd

Government
  - Mayor: Werner Schön

Area
  - Total: 3.3 km^{2} (1.3 sq mi)
- Elevation: 0 m (0 ft)

Population (2025-12-31)
  - Total: 872
  - Density: 260/km^{2} (680/sq mi)
- Time zone: UTC+01:00 (CET)
  - Summer (DST): UTC+02:00 (CEST)
- Postal codes: 17459
- Dialling codes: 038377
- Vehicle registration: VG

Zempin is a German municipality and the smallest seaside resort on Usedom island. It lies between Zinnowitz and Koserow on the narrowest part of the island, between the Baltic Sea and the Achterwasser, a bay of the Oder Lagoon.

Zempin lies on an isthmus on the island of Usedom. It is located within the Usedom Nature Park and is one of the four so-called Amber Spas on the island, connected by a 12 km long fine sandy beach called Amber Beach. The other three amber spas are Loddin, Koserow and Ückeritz.

As of 2015, Zempin had a population of 938.

The place can be reached by federal highway B111 and has a station on the Usedom island railway.

== History ==
The place was mentioned for the first time in 1571. It was described as a farmer and fishery village and stood at first under Pomeranian, then Swedish and Prussian sovereignty. A beach hotel was built in 1895, marking the beginning of Zempin as a seaside resort. In 1911, Zempin railway connection was established, joined the German bath federation in 1928 and in 1933 a sea-bridge was established.

Between 1943 and 1945 in the forest area between Zinnowitz and Zempin three launching sites of V1 cruise missiles were built for experimental purposes. Still today some remains are present. In 1956 a camping site was created and since 1990, Zempin has been nationally recognized as a seaside resort.
