= Ückeritz =

- Municipality
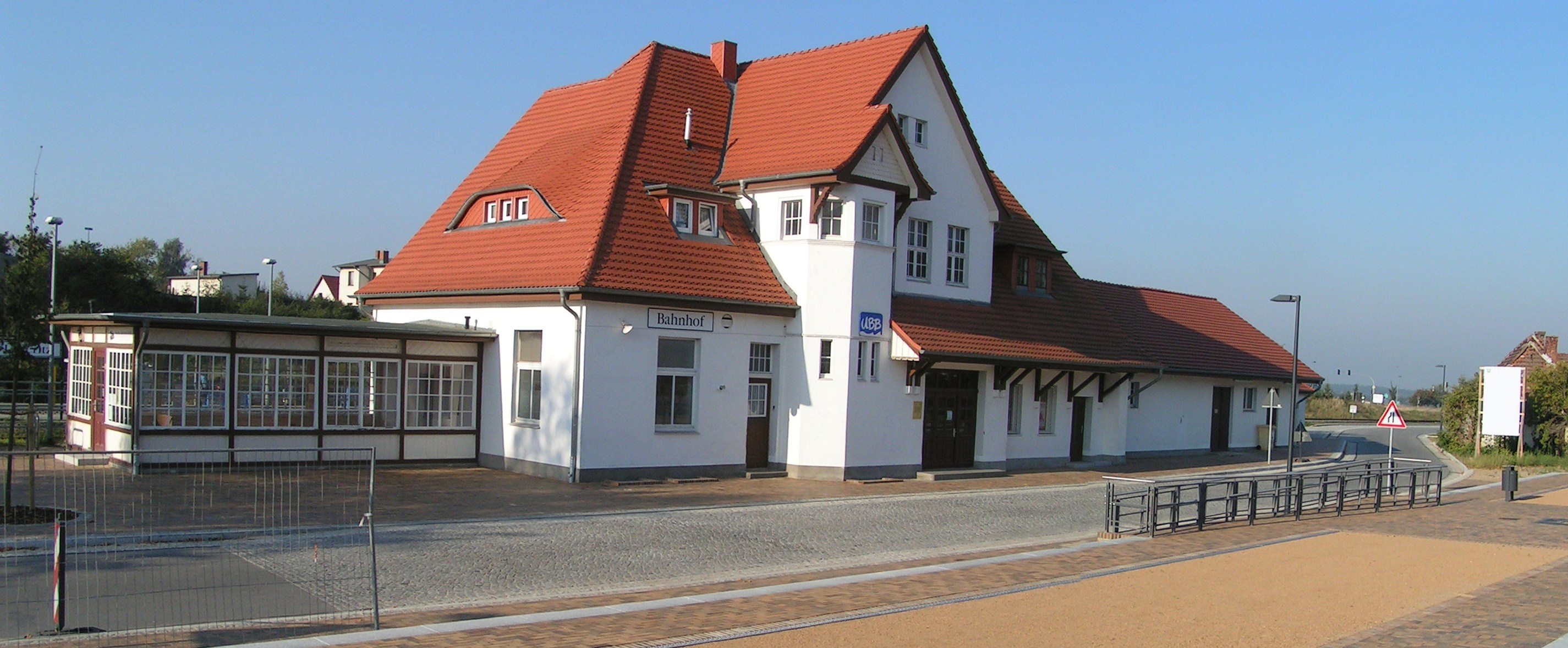
- Ueckeritz UBB train station

- Coat of arms

- Location of Ückeritz within Vorpommern-Greifswald district
- Interactive map of Ückeritz
- Location within Germany Location within Mecklenburg-Vorpommern
- Coordinates: 54°01′N 14°03′E
- Country: Germany
- State: Mecklenburg-Vorpommern
- District: Vorpommern-Greifswald
- Municipal assoc.: Usedom-Süd

Government
  - Mayor: Gerd Gamradt

Area
  - Total: 13.64 km^{2} (5.27 sq mi)
- Elevation: 1 m (3.3 ft)

Population (2025-12-31)
  - Total: 1,020
  - Density: 74.8/km^{2} (194/sq mi)
- Time zone: UTC+01:00 (CET)
  - Summer (DST): UTC+02:00 (CEST)
- Postal codes: 17459
- Dialling codes: 038375
- Vehicle registration: VG
- Website: www.ueckeritz.de

Ückeritz is a municipality in the Vorpommern-Greifswald district, in Mecklenburg-Vorpommern, Germany.

A small coastal bathing resort, Ückeritz lies on the island of Usedom on the Baltic Sea. It is located within the Usedom Nature Park and is one of four spas called Amber Spas on the island, connected by a 12 km long fine sandy beach called Amber Beach. The other three amber spas are Loddin, Koserow and Zempin.

As of 2015, Ückeritz had a population of 1,007.

The place can be reached by federal highway B111 and has a station on the Usedom island railway.
