= Loddin =

- Municipality
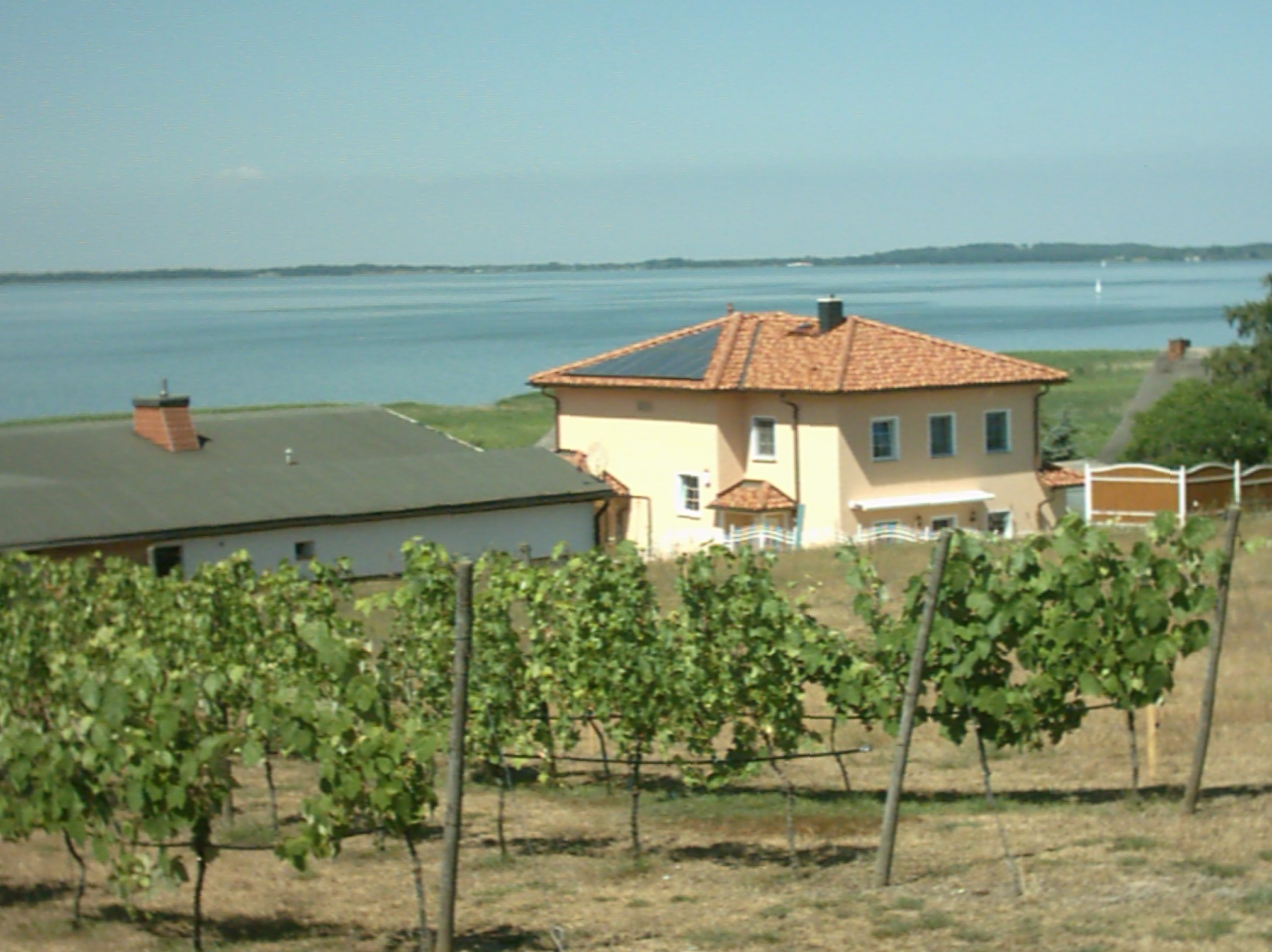
- Germany's northernmost vineyard in Loddin (Usedom Island)

- Coat of arms

- Location of Loddin within Vorpommern-Greifswald district
- Interactive map of Loddin
- Location within Germany Location within Mecklenburg-Vorpommern
- Coordinates: 54°2′N 14°1′E
- Country: Germany
- State: Mecklenburg-Vorpommern
- District: Vorpommern-Greifswald
- Municipal assoc.: Usedom-Süd
- Subdivisions: 3

Government
  - Mayor: Lorina Bremer

Area
  - Total: 6.07 km^{2} (2.34 sq mi)
- Elevation: 5 m (16 ft)

Population (2025-12-31)
  - Total: 864
  - Density: 142/km^{2} (369/sq mi)
- Time zone: UTC+01:00 (CET)
  - Summer (DST): UTC+02:00 (CEST)
- Postal codes: 17459
- Dialling codes: 038375
- Vehicle registration: VG
- Website: www.seebad-loddin.de

Loddin is a municipality on Usedom Island, in the Vorpommern-Greifswald district, in Mecklenburg-Vorpommern, Germany.

A small coastal bathing resort, Loddin lies on an isthmus on the island of Usedom on the Baltic Sea. It is located within the Usedom Nature Park and is one of the four so-called Amber Spas on the island, connected by a 12 km long fine sandy beach called Amber Beach. The other three amber spas are Koserow, Ückeritz and Zempin.

Loddin has some vineyards at the Baltic Sea.

As of 2015, Loddin had a population of 969.

The place can be reached by federal highway B111 and has a station on the Usedom island railway.
