= Usedom Island Nature Park =

Nature park in Mecklenburg-Vorpommern, Germany

Coordinates: 53°58′N 14°03′E

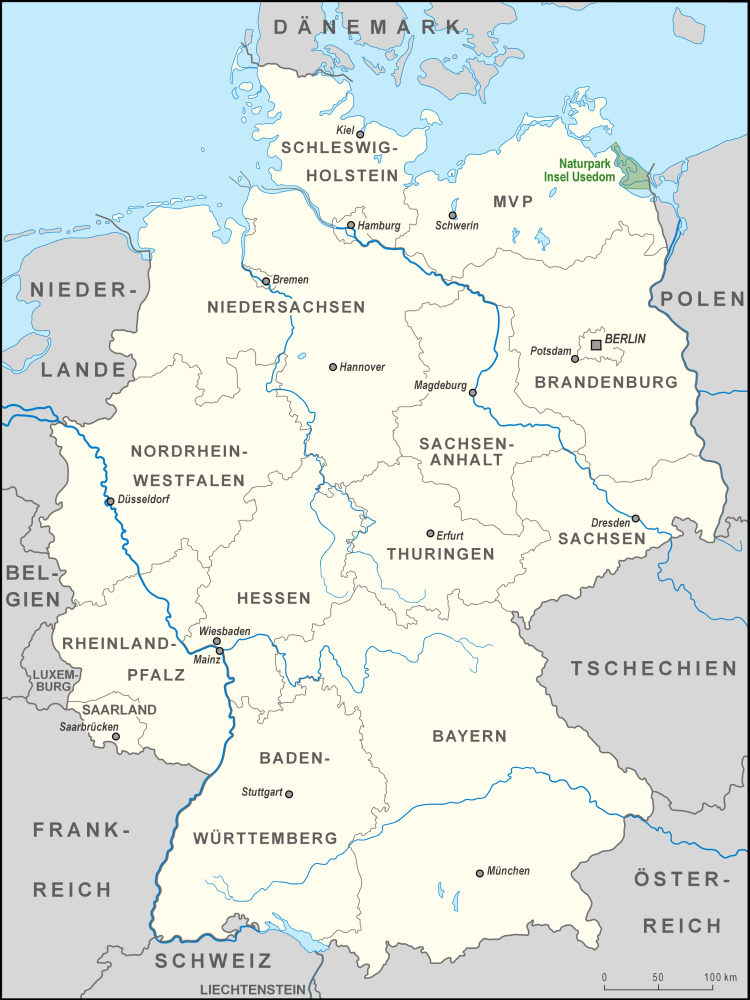
Location of Usedom Island Nature Park

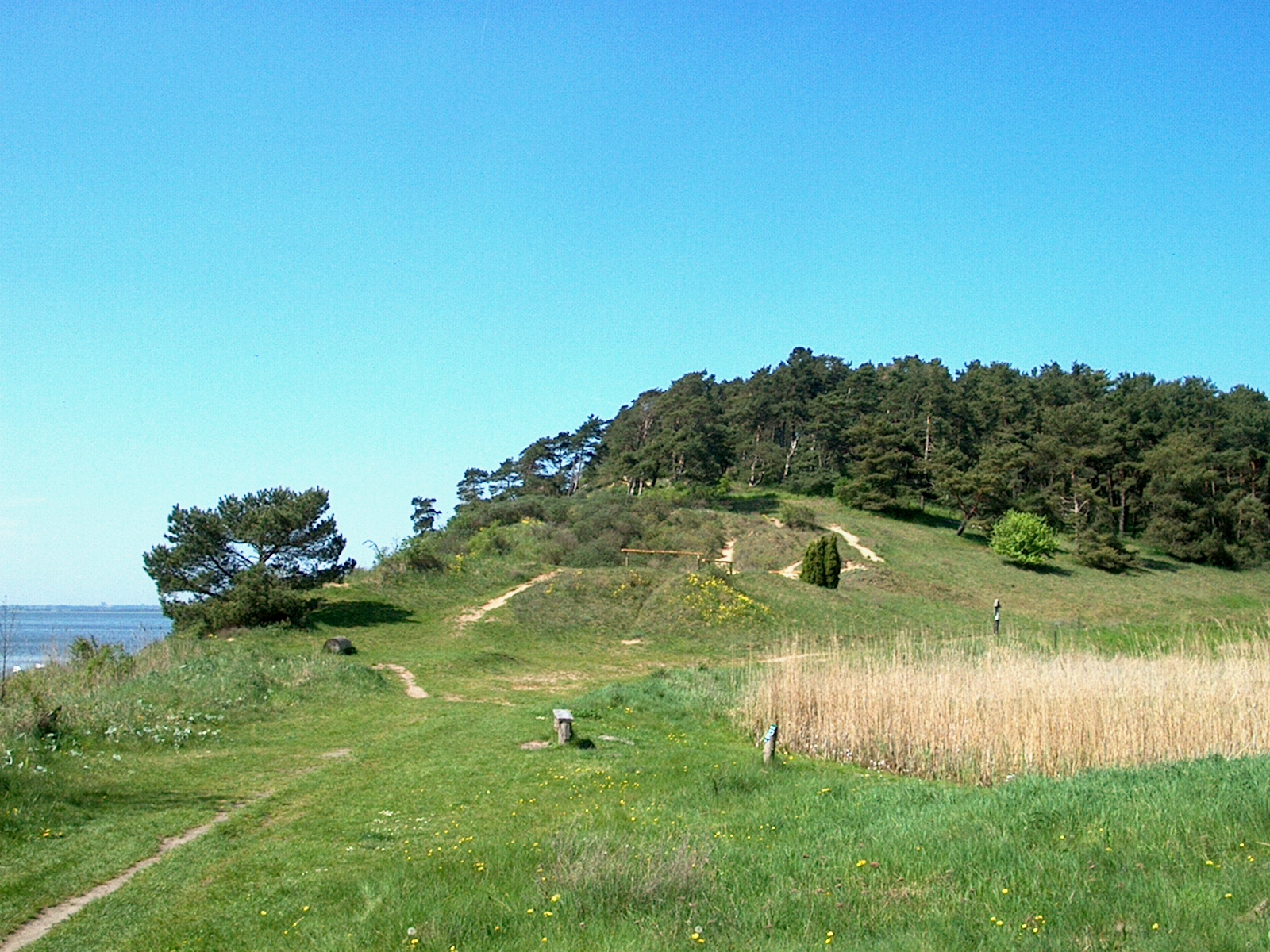
Landscape on the Gnitz in the park

The Usedom Island Nature Park (German: Naturpark Insel Usedom) comprises the German part of the island of Usedom in the district of Vorpommern-Greifswald in the state of Mecklenburg-Vorpommern, Germany. In addition to the island itself, the park covers the waterbody between the island and the mainland as well as small strips of mainland in the northwest and west near the seaside resorts of Lubmin and the town of Lassan.

Even in East German days several parts of Usedom had been declared nature reserves, and they were gradually expanded. It was designated a protected area in 1966 and, in 1993, expanded to the area of the present-day nature park.

In December 1999 the entire region was officially designated a nature park in the sense of being a large-scale cultural landscape. An information centre, the Ruth and Klaus Bahlsen House, with exhibition rooms, maps and leaflets, is located in the historic station building on the Bäderstraße from Usedom. The building was promoted as part of an INTERREG project and completed in 2005.

The park is bounded by the Baltic Sea on the Bay of Greifswald (Greifswalder Bodden), the Peenestrom river, the Achterwasser lagoon and the Oder Lagoon (Stettiner Haff). The total area of the park is 632 square kilometres (244 sq mi). Roughly 30% of this area is covered by forest, about 50% by lakes and the bay, 15% is moorland and the remaining area is a cultural landscape. A special feature of the nature park is the great diversity of landscapes within a small area. These include beach and littoral, lakes and marshes, dunes, pine and beech forests mixed with small villages and fields. The island of Usedom is one of the richest bird areas in Germany. Osprey, white stork, crane and heron all breed in the nature reserve. The eutrophic and shallow lakes, such as the Gothensee and Schmollensee are ideal for bird roosting and nesting sites. The park is easily accessed on the B110 from Anklam or the B 111 from Wolgast or by rail on the Usedomer Bäderbahn. At the edge of the park is the municipality of Heringsdorf with its villages of Ahlbeck, Heringsdorf and Bansin.
