= Bundesstraße 111 =

Federal highway in Germany

B 111
- Bundesstraße 111

Route information
- Length: 69 km (43 mi)

Major junctions
- A 20

Location
- Country: Germany
- States: Mecklenburg-Vorpommern

Highway system
- Roads in Germany; Autobahns; List; Federal; List; State; E-roads

Bundesstraße 111 (abbreviated B 111) begins at the A 20 motorway (Autobahn) near Gützkow and ends at the B 110 near Mellenthin in northeast Germany.

Since January 2008 the Bundesstraße 111 has followed the course of the old state road (Landesstraße) L 265 (Schmollensee-Pudagla-Mellenthin). Previously the route of the B 111 ran to the Polish border on the island of Usedom in the seaside resort village of Ahlbeck in the parish of Heringsdorf.

== Junction lists ==
	(27)	Gützkow A 20
		Gützkow
		Gribow
		Züssow
Crossing		B 109
		Lühmannsdorf
		Wolgast
		Peene Bridge, Wolgast
		Bannemin-Mölschow
		Zinnowitz
		Zempin
		Koserow
		Kölpinsee-Loddin
		Pudagla
		Neppermin
		Mellenthin
Crossing		B 110
