= Usedomer Bäderbahn =

German company, subsidiary of Deutsche Bahn

UBB Usedomer Bäderbahn GmbH
- Type: Limited liability company (Gesellschaft mit beschränkter Haftung)
- Industry: Transport
- Founded: 1994
- Headquarters: Heringsdorf
- Key people: Dörte Basler and Chris Wittmann
- Revenue: 28,2 Mio. EUR (2025)
- Total assets: 27,300,000 euro (2008)
- Number of employees: 218
- Website: www.ubb-online.com

The Usedomer Bäderbahn (UBB) with its head office in Heringsdorf, northeastern Germany, is a 100 percent-owned subsidiary of the German national railway, Deutsche Bahn and the owner and operator of the railway network on the island of Usedom as well as the Züssow–Wolgast and Velgast–Barth lines. It refers to all the lines on which it runs services – i.e. Züssow–Stralsund–Velgast – as the Vorpommernbahn or “West Pomeranian Railway”.

The UBB is a member of the Fare Association of Federal and Non-Federal Railways in Germany (Tarifverband der Bundeseigenen und Nichtbundeseigenen Eisenbahnen in Deutschland) or TBNE, albeit without voting rights, because it belongs to Deutsche Bahn.

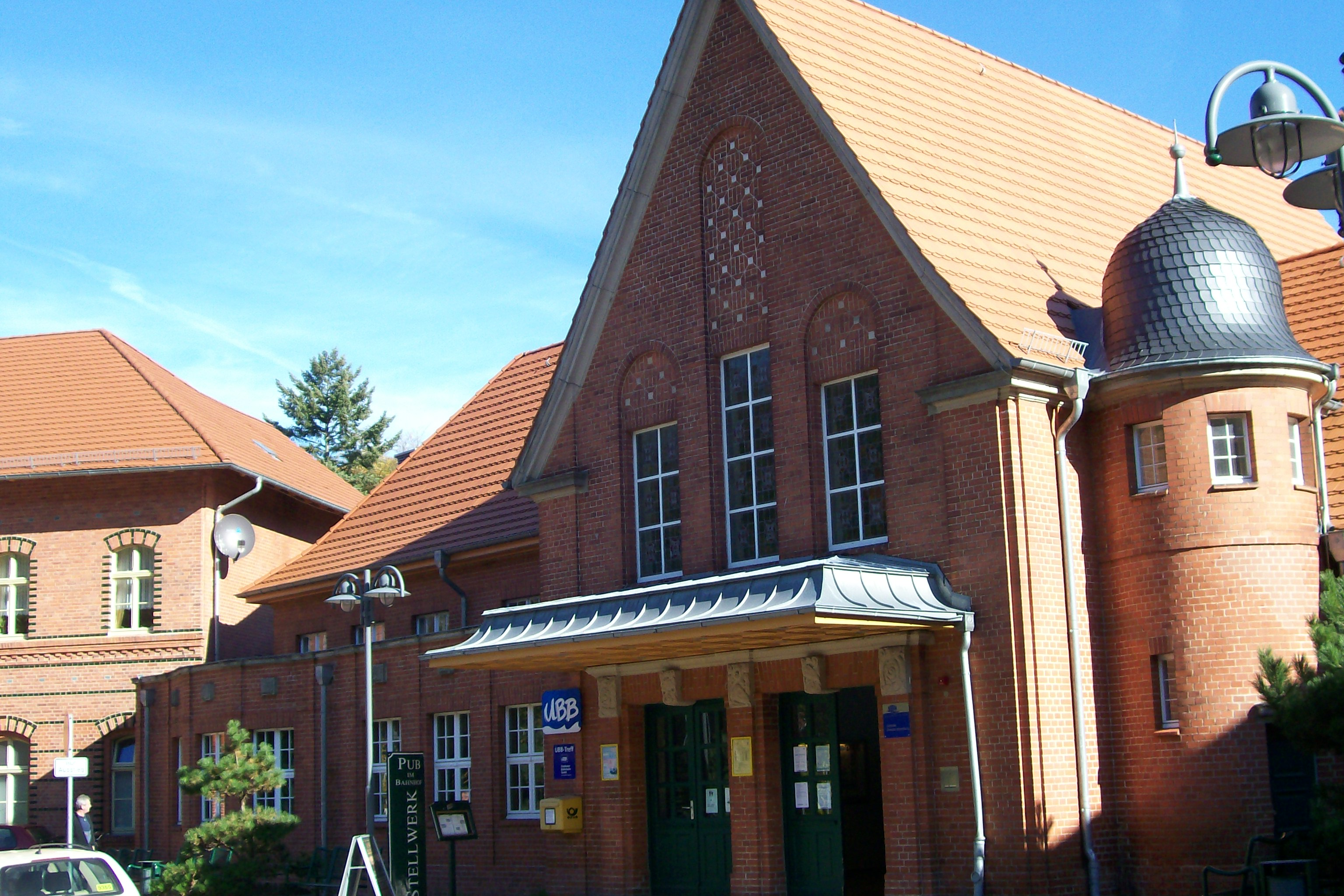
Seebad Heringsdorf station, built in 1894, showing here the 1907 annex

== Network ==
=== Current services ===
Line	KBS	Route	Duration of contract
RB 23	193	Züssow – Wolgast – Zinnowitz – Seebad Heringsdorf – Świnoujście Centrum	
RB 24	194	Zinnowitz – Peenemünde	
RB 25	192	Velgast – Barth (Vorpommernbahn)	

== Sources ==
- Horst-Werner Dumjahn: Handbuch der deutschen Eisenbahnstrecken, Mainz 1984 ISBN 3-921426-29-4
  Nachdruck der Eröffnungsdaten 1835–1935 herausgegeben Berlin 1935
