= Wilhelm Kutscher =

German lawyer and politician (1876–1962)

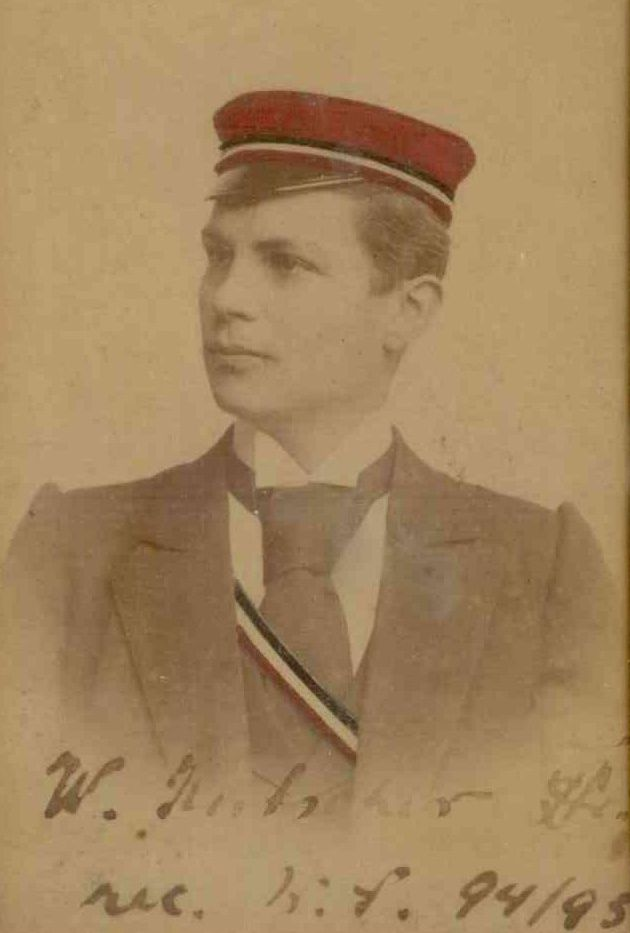
- Kutscher as a college student, c. 1894–95

Oberpräsident Province of East Prussia
- In office 4 October 1932 – 2 June 1933
- Preceded by: Ernst Siehr
- Succeeded by: Erich Koch

Regierungspräsident Regierungsbezirk Hildesheim
- In office April 1919 – July 1922
- Preceded by: Paul Fromme
- Succeeded by: Carl von Halfern

Additional positions
- 1912–1915: Member of the Pomeranian Landtag
- 1933–1945: Member of the Prussian State Council

Personal details
- Born: 26 December 1876 Wobesde, Province of Pomerania, Kingdom of Prussia, German Empire
- Died: 13 June 1962 (age 85) Göttingen, Lower Saxony, West Germany
- Party: German National People's Party
- Education: University of Tübingen; Humboldt University of Berlin; University of Greifswald
- Profession: Lawyer; Civil servant

Military service
- Allegiance: German Empire
- Branch/service: Royal Prussian Army
- Years of service: 1898–1899
- Unit: 5th (Pomeranian) Hussars Regiment "Prince Blücher of Wahlstatt"

Wilhelm Hermann Kutscher (26 December 1876 – 13 June 1962) was a German lawyer and politician who served in the Prussian civil service during the German Empire and the Weimar Republic. He was the Oberpräsident of the Province of East Prussia from 1932 to 1933 and was forced out of office after the Nazi Party came to power.

== Early life and education ==
Wilhelm Kutscher was born the son of an estate owner in Wobesde (today, Objazda) in the Prussian Province of Pomerania. He attended the Gymnasium in Stolp (today, Słupsk), where he received his Abitur in 1894. He began studying law at the Eberhard Karls University of Tübingen and became a member of the student corps Suevia Tübingen. He also attended the Humboldt University of Berlin and the University of Greifswald. He passed the Referendar state examination in Greifswald in 1897 and was awarded a Doctor of Law degree. From 1898 to 1899 he fulfilled his military service requirement in the Royal Prussian Army as a one-year volunteer with the 5th (Pomeranian) Hussars Regiment "Prince Blücher of Wahlstatt", headquartered in Stolp. He entered the Prussian civil service and was assigned to the Trier district as a government legal trainee in 1901. After passing the Assessor state examination, he was employed as a government administrative lawyer in Perleberg, Schlawe (today, Sławno), Köslin (today, Koszalin) and Neustettin (today, Szczecinek) between 1903 and 1907.

== Political career ==
From 1907 to 1914 Kutscher was the Landrat (District Administrator) of the Lauenburg im Pommern district (today, part of the Pomeranian Voivodeship). He also was elected as a member of the Landtag of the Province of Pomerania from 1912 to 1915. From 1914 until 1919 he was a Geheime Regierungsrat (Privy Government Councilor) in the Prussian Ministry of the Interior. During the First World War, he worked closely with East Prussian Oberpräsident Adolf Tortilowicz von Batocki-Friebe in the reconstruction of towns and communities that had been damaged or destroyed by the Russian military invasion of August 1914. After the end of the war and the establishment of the Weimar Republic, he became a member of the German National People's Party. He was promoted and transferred to the Regierungsbezirk Hildesheim in April 1919 as the Regierungspräsident (District President) where he remained until July 1922. From 1923 to 1932 he worked as an executive board member of the German Agricultural Council under its president, Ernst Brandes and concurrently sat as a member of the Provisional Reich Economic Council.

After the takeover of the Prussian state government by the central Reich government in July 1932, East Prussian Oberpräsident Ernst Siehr was relieved of office and Kutscher was appointed as his successor on 4 October 1932. However, following the Nazi seizure of power, Kutscher was slow to implement the Nazi policy of Gleichschaltung (coordination) and was reluctant to remove qualified incumbents from their posts in favor of Nazi Party loyalists. Despite the objections of Prussian Minister president Hermann Göring who knew that Kutscher was experienced as well as well liked and respected by the East Prussian large landowners, he was replaced. He was forced out as Oberpräsident in favor of the Nazi Party Gauleiter Erich Koch on 2 June 1933.

On 11 July 1933, Göring appointed Kutscher to the recently reconstituted Prussian State Council, where he would serve in a purely advisory capacity until the fall of the Nazi regime in May 1945. He served briefly as a member of the Pomeranian Provincial Council before being permanently retired in 1934. He then joined the board of directors of both the Deutsche Rentenbank-Kreditanstalt and the Zentrallandschaftsbank and, additionally, was the chairman of the supervisory board at Deutschen Bodenkultur AG. Little is documented of his post-war life and he died in Göttingen on 13 June 1962.

== Sources ==
- Lilla, Joachim (2005). Der Preußische Staatsrat 1921–1933: Ein biographisches Handbuch. Düsseldorf: Droste Verlag. ISBN 978-1-474-60789-6.
- Miller, Michael D.; Schulz, Andreas (2017). Gauleiter: The Regional Leaders of the Nazi Party and Their Deputies, 1925–1945. Vol. 2 (Georg Joel - Dr. Bernhard Rust). R. James Bender Publishing. ISBN 978-1-932-97032-6.
- Suevia-Tübingen 1831–1931, Bd. 2: Mitglieder, Tübingen 1931, S. 173 (Nr. 511)
- Volz, Robert: Reichshandbuch der deutschen Gesellschaft. Das Handbuch der Persönlichkeiten in Wort und Bild. Band 1: A–K. Deutscher Wirtschaftsverlag, Berlin 1930, pp. 1050–1051.
- Wilhelm Kutscher entry in the Files of the Reich Chancellery (Weimar Republic)
