= Senate of the Free City of Danzig =

Government of the Free City of Danzig

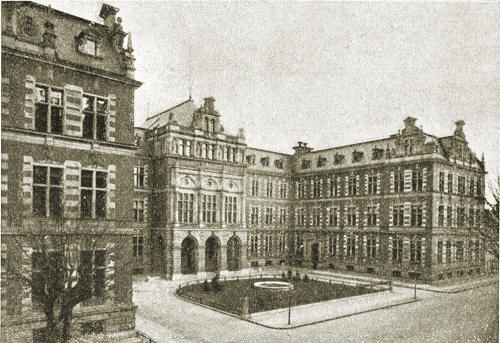
Senate Building

The Senate of the Free City of Danzig was the government of the Free City of Danzig from 1920 to 1939, after the Allied administration of Reginald Tower and the Danzig Staatsrat.

== Constitutional Regulations ==
Senate Flag

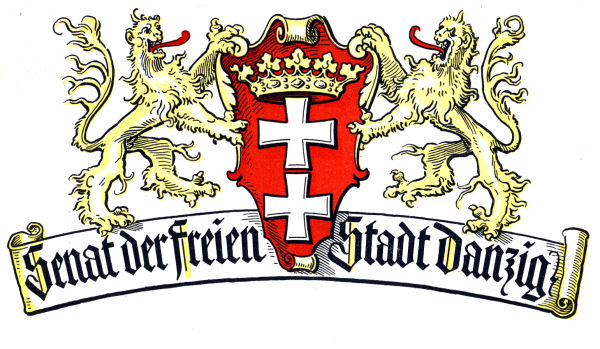
Senate Coat of Arms

The separation of Danzig from the German Reich as a "Free City" without a vote led to the need to draft a constitution. In the Constitution of the Free City of Danzig, articles 25 to 42 detailed and regulated the role of the Senate. The Senate consisted of 7 full-time senators (including the President of the Senate, who was the chairman, and the Deputy President, the Vice Chairman) and 13 honorary senators. The full-time senators were elected from the Volkstag, and served 4-year terms. The honorary senators could serve indefinite terms. Only by a vote of no confidence from the Volkstag could honorary senators be recalled. Even with a dissolution of the Volkstag, the Senate could remain in power.

The Senate was the highest state authority. In particular, it had the tasks:

- to announce the laws within a month of their constitutional formation and to issue the ordinances necessary for their execution;
- to run the state administration independently within the framework of the constitution, the laws and the state budget, and to exercise = supervision over all state authorities;
- to draw up the budget draft;
- to manage the property and revenues of the state, to remit revenues and expenditures and to defend the rights of the state;
- to appoint officials, unless stated otherwise by constitution or law;
- to operate within the framework of the constitution and the laws for the safety and public welfare of the State and of all nationals, and to adopt its necessary regulations.

In articles 43 to 49, which detailed legislative procedures, laws had to be approved by both the Volkstag and the Senate. In the event that the Senate failed to approve bills on the day it was proposed, a referendum would be held. Constitutional amendments required a two-thirds majority.

With the constitutional amendment of July 4, 1930, the number of senators was reduced to 12 (with the members of the Volkstag decreased from 120 to 72).

== Individual Senates ==
=== First Sahm Senate ===
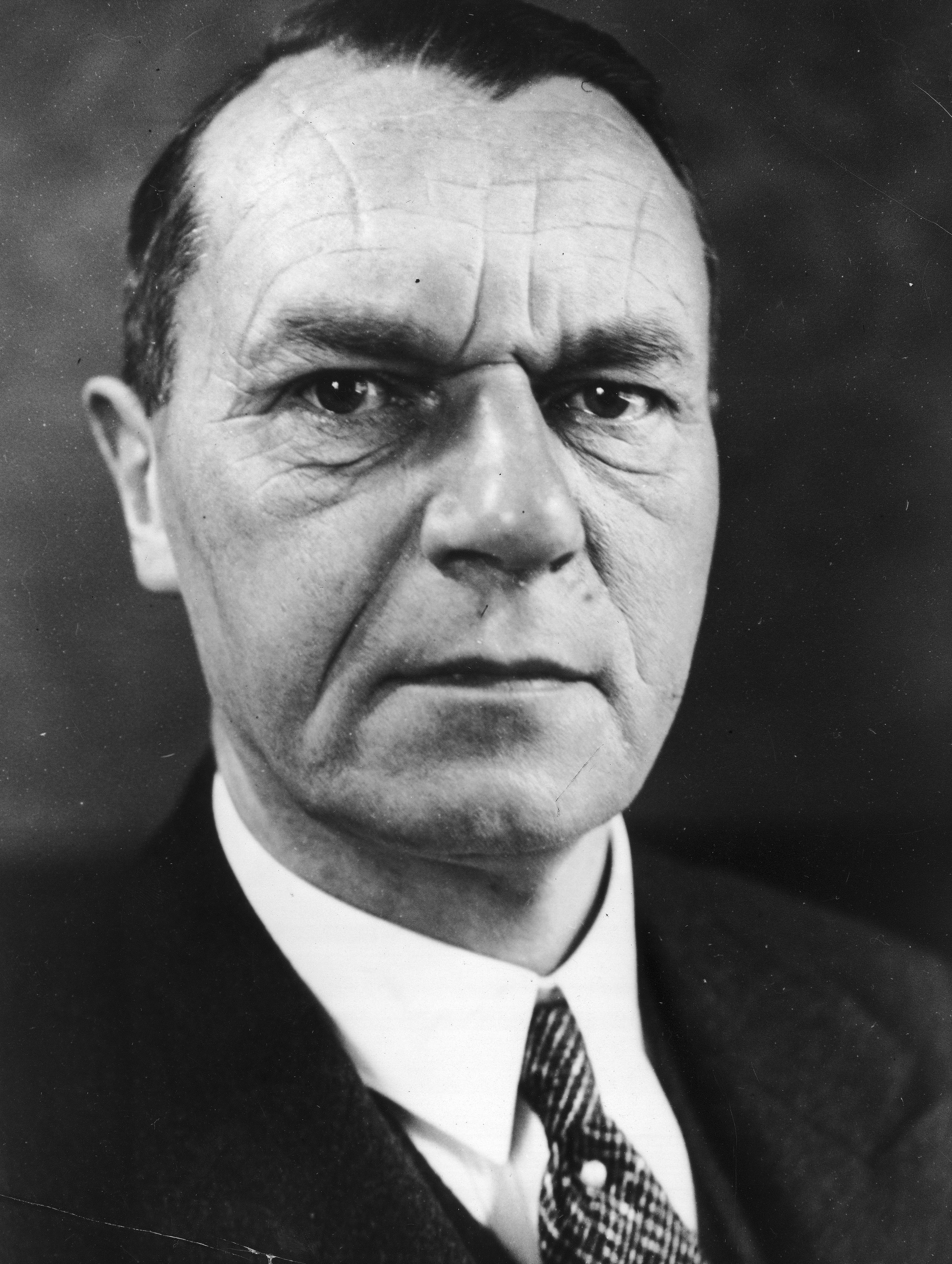
A portrait of Heinrich Sahm

After the establishment of the Free City of Danzig on November 15, 1920, the Constituent Assembly elected the members of the first senate on December 6. It was a bourgeois coalition between the DNVP, the DPP and the liberal Free Economic Association. The Social Democrats were the main opposition. The head of the government was Heinrich Sahm, the former mayor, who did not belong to any party. There were 4 DNVP, 4 DDP and 5 liberals in the Senate. At the second Volkstag election on November 18, 1923, the coalition continued. The First Sahm Senate continued until December 10, until it was replaced by the Second Sahm Senate. The honorary members of the First Sahm Senate, including the Deputy President, resigned on January 15, 1924.

Status	Office	Name	Party
Full-time	President of the Senate	Heinrich Sahm	Partyless
Full-time	Interior Minister	Wilhelm Schümmer	Zentrum
Full-time	Municipal Affairs	Dr. Hubertus Schwartz	
Full-time	Culture	Dr. Hermann Strunk	DDP, from 1921 DPFW
Full-time	Finance	Ernst Volkmann (from February 8, 1921)	Partyless
Full-time	Public Works	Dr. Otto Leske	
Full-time	State-owned Enterprise	Prof. Ludwig Noé (until April 26, 1921)	DDP, from 1921 DPFW
Full-time	State-owned Enterprise	Wolf Runge (from April 27, 1921)	
Full-time	Justice and Social Affairs	Dr. Albert Frank	DNVP
Honorary	Deputy to the President	Dr. Ernst Ziehm (elected on January 16, 1924)	DNVP
Honorary	Agriculture and Forestry	Franz Ziehm (elected on January 16, 1924)	DNVP
Honorary	Business	Gustav Karow (elected on January 16, 1924)	DNVP
Honorary		Otto Pertuss (from January 23, 1924)	DNVP
Honorary		Georg Bennecke (until April 30, 1921)	DNVP
Honorary		Richard Senftleben (elected on January 16, 1924)	DNVP
Honorary		Otto Schulze (from January 16, 1924)	DNVP
Honorary		Kette (re-elected on January 16, 1924)	DNVP
Honorary		Schiffsreeder Bosselmann (from January 16, 1924)	DNVP
Honorary		Ingenieur Jansson (from May 27, 1921 to January 15, 1924)	DNVP
Honorary		Anton Sawatzki (elected on January 16, 1924)	Zentrum
Honorary		Karl Fuchs (elected on January 16, 1924)	Zentrum
Honorary		Union Secretary Krause (elected on January 16, 1924)	Zentrum
Honorary		City Council Dr. Wiercinski (from January 16, 1924)	Zentrum
Honorary	Economy	Julius Jewelowski (until January 18, 1924)	DDP, from 1921 DPFW
Honorary	Nutrition	Dr. Paul Eschert (until January 15, 1924)	FWV, from 1921 DPFW
Honorary		Factory Director Dr. Unger (from January 16 to October 15, 1924)	DPFW
Honorary		Factory Director Briechle (from January 16 to October 15, 1924)	DPFW
Honorary	Savings	Gustav Fuchs (until January 15, 1924)	Liberal
Honorary	Post Office	Emil Förster (until January 15, 1924)	FWV, from 1921 DPFW

=== Second Sahm Senate ===
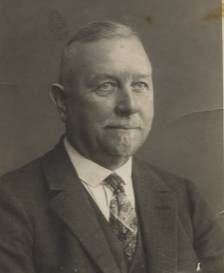
Julius Gehl, local SPD leader

The rejection of the state budget of 1925 by Deputy President Ernst Ziehm led to a crisis in the government. A new senate was formed on August 19, 1925. This senate was a minority senate, made from a coalition of the SPD, Zentrum, and the German Liberal Party (formed from a 1925 merge of the Free Association of Civil servants, Employees and Workers and the German Party for Progress and Economy (the name of the Free Economic Association since 1920)). This government was tolerated by the Poles and socialist politician Wilhelm Rahn.

Status	Office	Name	Party	Annotations
Full-time	President of the Senate	Heinrich Sahm	Partyless	
Full-time	Interior	Willibald Wiercinski-Keiser	Zentrum	
Full-time	Social Welfare	Hubertus Schwartz		
Full-time	Culture	Hermann Strunk	DDP	
Full-time	Finance	Ernst Volkmann	Partyless	
Full-time	Public Works	Dr. Otto Leske		
Full-time	State-owned Enterprise	Wolf Runge		
Full-time	Justice	Albert Frank	DNVP	
Honorary	Deputy to the President	Ernst Ziehm	DNVP	until 1925
Honorary	Deputy to the President	Wilhelm Riepe	DNVP	from 1926
Honorary		Anton Sawatzki	Zentrum	
Honorary		Hugo Neumann	Liberal	
Honorary		Max Behrendt	SPD	1925–1926
Honorary	Vice President	Julius Gehl	SPD	1925–1926
Honorary		Friedrich Grünhagen	SPD	1925–1926
Honorary		Bernhard Kamnitzer	SPD	1925–1926
Honorary		Ernst Loops	SPD	1925–1926
Honorary		Walter Reek	SPD	1925–1926

=== Third Sahm Senate ===
In the third Volkstag election on November 13, 1927, there was a further political shift towards the SPD. The parties of the previous minority government now had a majority. Without prejudice for some changes in senators, the SPD, Zentrum, and the Liberals continued to dominate the senate.

The coalition collapsed in 1930, divided over the question of housing management and financing laws. On March 29, the Liberals left the coalition, with the SPD following suit on April 2. In May 1930, Heinrich Sahm's attempt to form a bourgeois senate failed. Sahm suffered another setback in a vote to amend the constitution, in which the DNVP succeeded in reducing the number of seats in the Volkstag from 120 to 72. This Senate remained in office until January 9, 1931.

Status	Office	Name	Party
Full-time	Präsident of the Senate	Heinrich Sahm	Partyless
Full-time	Interior	Friedrich Grünhagen	SPD
Full-time	Social Welfare	Willibald Wiercinski-Keiser	Zentrum
Full-time	Culture	Hermann Strunk	DDP
Full-time	Finance	Bernhard Kamnitzer	SPD
Full-time	Public Works	Franz Arczynski	SPD
Full-time	Construction	Hugo Althoff	Zentrum
Full-time	Justice and Post Office	Albert Evert	DDP
Honorary		Anton Sawatzki	Zentrum
Honorary		Gustav Fuchs	Zentrum
Honorary		Bruno Kurowski	Zentrum
Honorary		Julius Jewelowski	DDP
Honorary		Hans Zint	SPD
Honorary		Julius Gehl	SPD
Honorary		Willy Moritz	SPD

=== Ziehm Senate ===
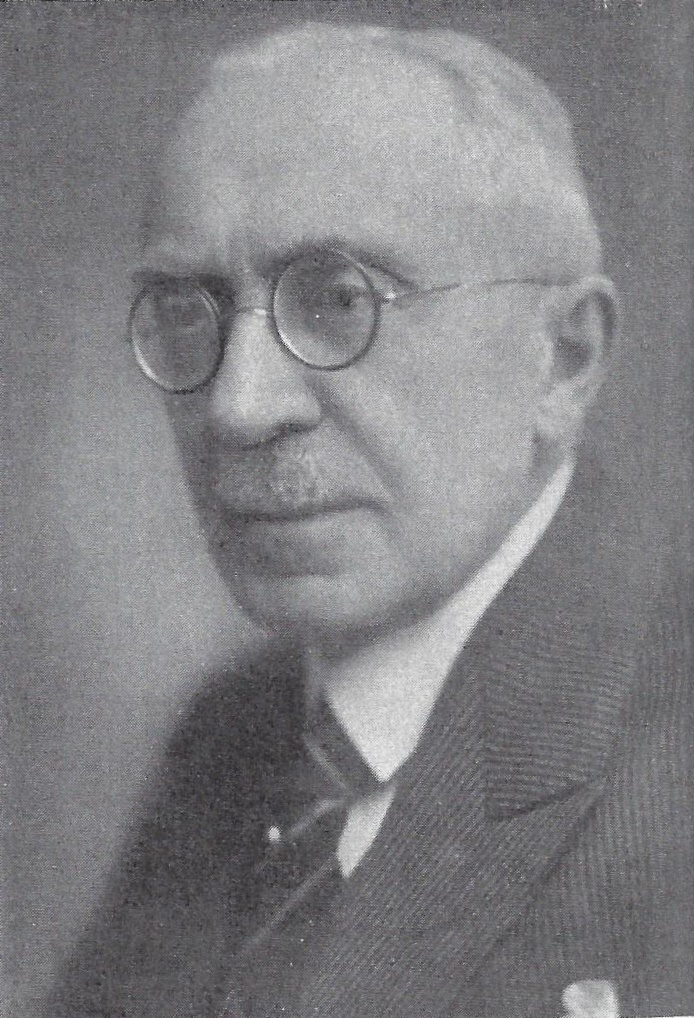
A portrait of Ernst Ziehm

In the fourth Volkstag election on November 16, 1930, neither the left or the bourgeois parties had received majorities. The NSDAP, which had received 12 seats, tipped the scales. On January 10, 1931, a new senate was formed under Ernst Ziehm, with its members being parts of the DNVP, Zentrum, and the Liberals. The Nazis tolerated this senate, even though they were prone to extreme political conflict with them.. However, in the autumn of 1931, the NSDAP discussed the possible fall and forceful removal of the Ziehm Senate, decided against by Adolf Hitler. Towards the end of 1932, Hitler changed his mind and started planning to remove the Ziehm Senate. With his appointment as Chancellor in January 1933, it was time for the NSDAP to come into power in Danzig. They deprived the Senate of confidence in Ziehm and offered to enter into a joint senate with the bourgeois parties if Hermann Rauschning became Senate President and the NSDAP appointed the Interior Senator. The bourgeois parties rejected this proposition and the Senate resigned, remaining in office until June 20, 1933.

This Senate was known for increasing authoritarianism in Danzig, even banning the social democratic newspaper Volkstimme for a short time in 1932. By 1932, the Nazis had tapped into the electoral power of the rural population of Danzig, and had become the second most popular party.

Status	Office	Name	Party
Full-time	President of the Senate; Agriculture	Ernst Ziehm	DNVP
Full-time	Deputy President; Social Welfare	Willibald Wiercinski-Keiser	Zentrum
Honorary	Interior	Georg Hinz	DNVP
Full-time	Culture	Alfred Winderlich	DNVP
Full-time	Culture	Julius Hoppenrath	NatBl (National Bloc)
Full-time	Public Works and Trade	Hugo Althoff	Zentrum
Full-time	Businesses, Transport and Work	Kurt Blavier	NatBl
Honorary	Justice	Fritz Dumont	NatBl
Honorary		Heinrich Schwegmann	DNVP
Honorary		Kaufmann Senftleben	DNVP
Honorary		Anton Sawatzki	Zentrum
Honorary		Bruno Kurowski	Zentrum

=== Rauschning Senate ===
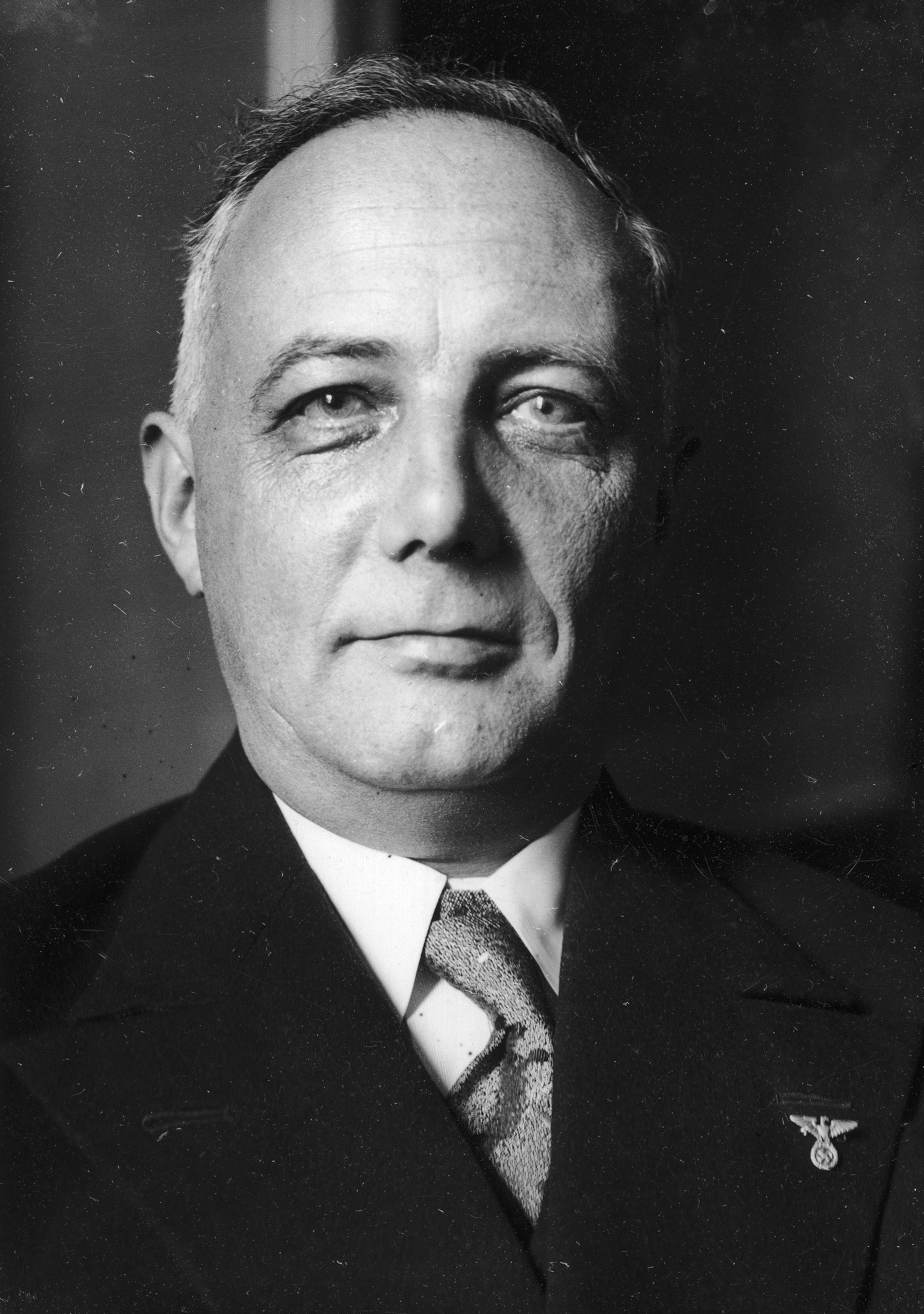
A portrait of Hermann Rauschning

In the fifth Volkstag election on May 28, 1933, the NSDAP gained an absolute majority. On June 20, 1933, a senate under prominent Danzig Nazi Hermann Rauschning was elected, with only Nazis aside from two Zentrum senators. The Volkstag voted to adopt the Enabling Act, allowing the Senate to use emergency decrees without the approval of the Volkstag.

Office	Name	Party
President of the Senate	Hermann Rauschning	NSDAP
Deputy President; Interior	Arthur Greiser	NSDAP
Social Welfare	Hans Albert Hohnfeldt	NSDAP
Culture	Adalbert Boeck	NSDAP
Finance	Julius Hoppenrath	NSDAP
Business	Wilhelm Huth	NSDAP
Construction	Karl August Hoepfner	NSDAP
Justice	Willibald Wiercinski-Keiser	Zentrum
Public Health	Helmut Adalbert Kluck	NSDAP
Public Enlightenment and Propaganda	Paul Batzer	NSDAP
Senators for Special Use	Wilhelm von Wnuck; Max Bertling; Anton Sawatzki	NSDAP; NSDAP; Zentrum

=== Greiser Senate ===
Arthur Greiser was made Senate President (Senatspräsident) in 1935–1939. As Senate President of Danzig, he was a rival to Albert Forster, his nominal superior in the Nazi Party (Gauleiter of the city) since 1930. Greiser was part of the SS empire whilst Forster was closely aligned with the Nazi Party Mandarins Rudolf Hess and later Martin Bormann.

=== Forster Senate ===
On 23 August 1939 Albert Forster replaced Greiser as Danzig's head of state.
