= Motława (ship) =

Polish passenger ferry

Coordinates: 54°21′02″N 18°39′32″E

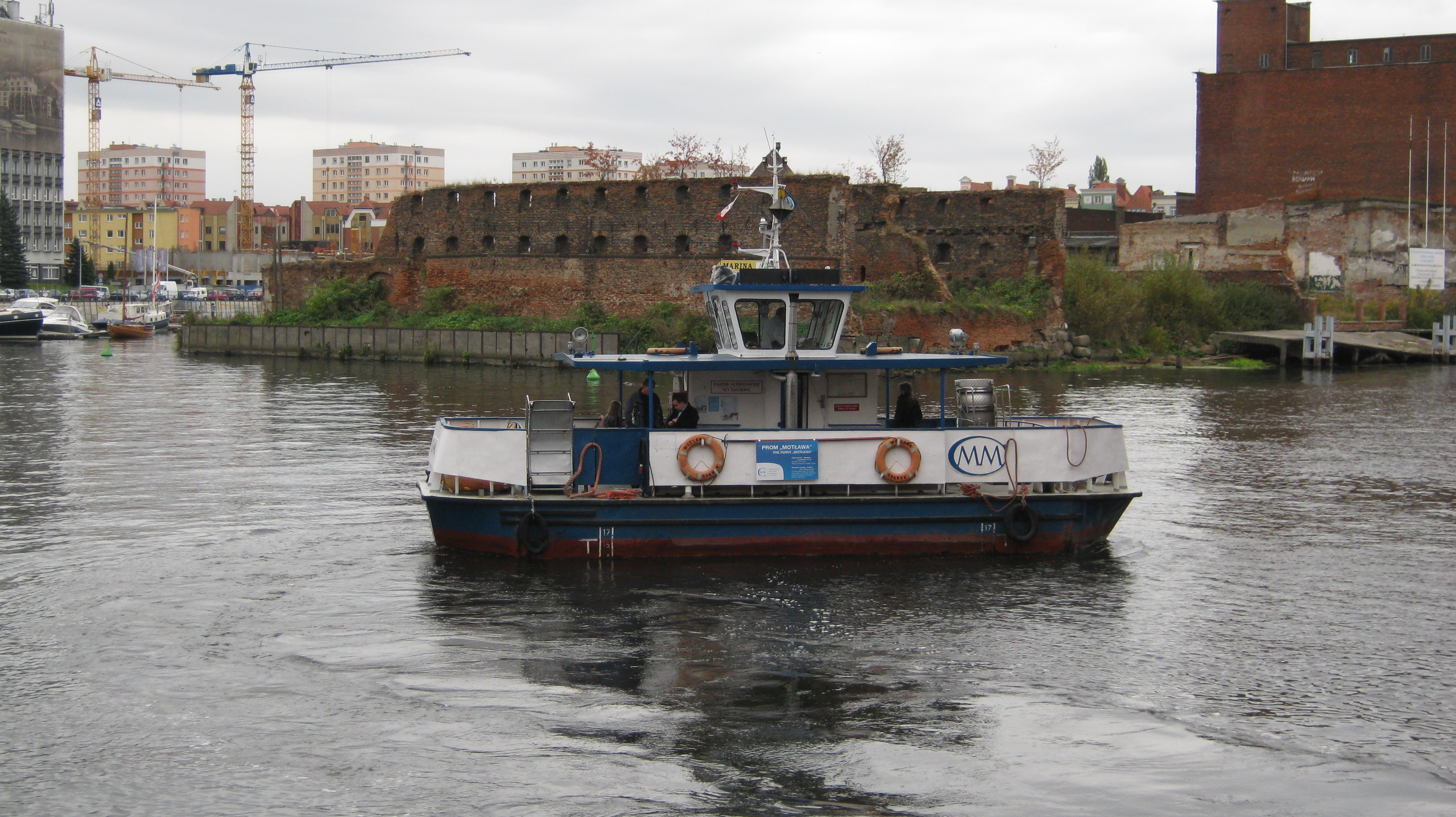
- Motława crossing the Motława

History

Poland
- Name: Motława
- Namesake: Motława
- Owner: National Maritime Museum
- Route: Ołowianka to Gdańsk
- Completed: 1987
- Status: in active service

General characteristics
- Length: 12.21 m (40 ft 1 in)
- Beam: 4.51 m (14 ft 10 in)
- Draught: 1.4 m (4 ft 7 in)
- Decks: 1
- Installed power: 44 kW (59 hp)
- Capacity: 50 passengers

Motława is a small passenger ferry operating on the river Motława in Gdańsk, Poland.

== History ==
The island Ołowianka on the river Motława is now connected by two bridges to the river banks. It is believed that since 1687 there has been a ferry between the island and the city.

== Overview ==
The ferry is built as a double-ended. On each side of a gangway is carried, allowing the passengers embarking and disembarking. The ferry has a single deck accessible to people outside, which is covered and offers some seating.

Under cover of the machine is located. The control bridge over the covered passenger area.

The ferry is mainly used by visitors to the National Maritime Museum. The ferry runs every 15 minutes. The trip takes about one minute.
