= Nowa Motława =

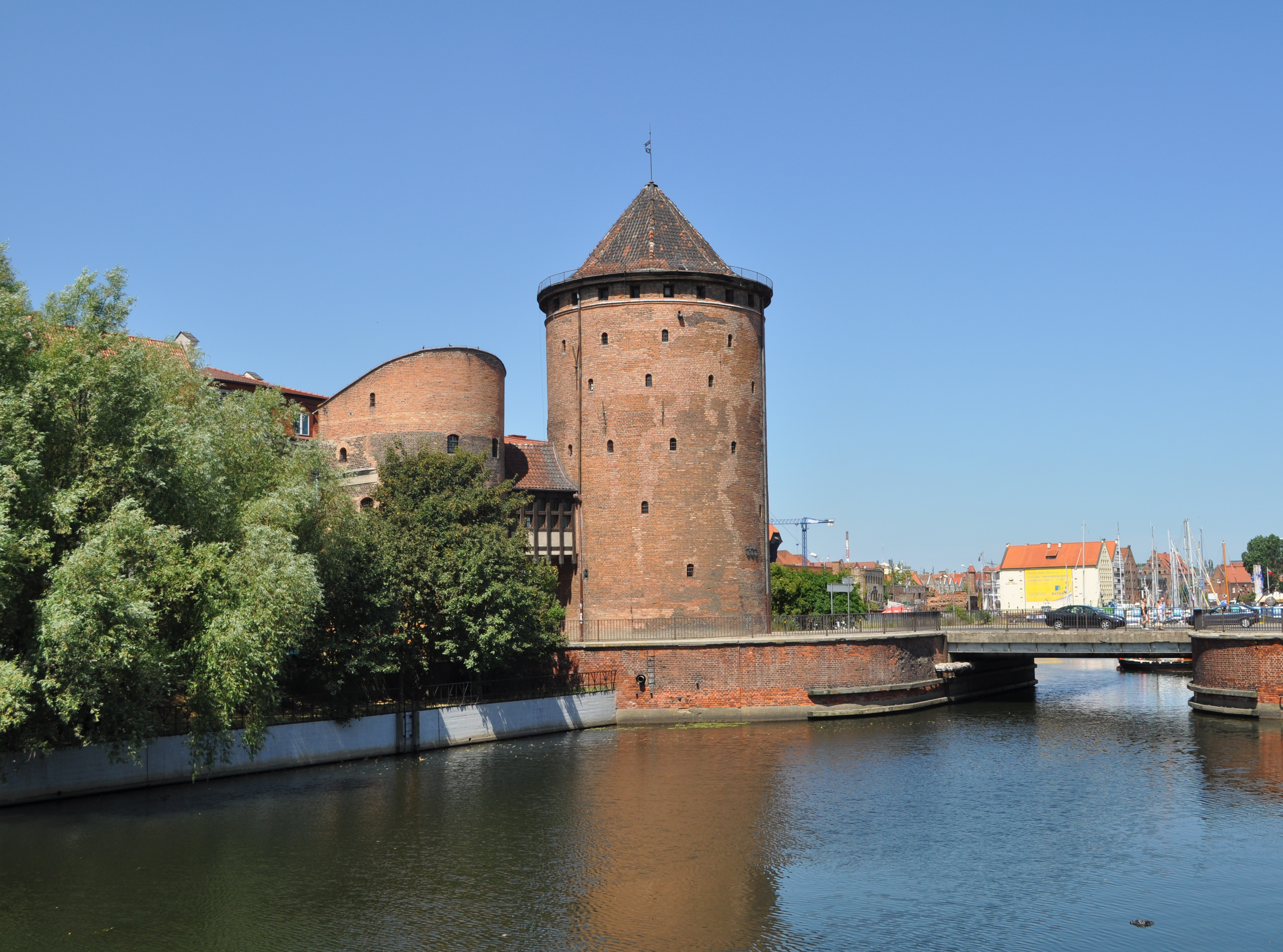
- Nowa Motława and the Milk Can Gate

Location
- Country: Poland

Physical characteristics
- Source
  - location: Stone Lock
- Mouth
  - location: Motława
  - coordinates: 54°21′00.9″N 18°39′31.6″E
- Length: 1.5 km (0.93 mi)

Basin features
- Progression: Motława→ Martwa Wisła→ Baltic Sea

Nowa Motława (German: Neue Mottlau) is a branch of the Motława river in the district (dzielnica) Śródmieście of the city of Gdańsk in Poland. It was artificially created in 1576.

Nowa Motława and Motława are forming Granary Island (Polish: Wyspa Spichrzów, German: Speicherinsel).

== History ==
The Motława river is the oldest part of the trade port. On the eastern bank granaries had been erected since the 14th century. The dug-through of Nowa Motława was made in 1576. The water was regulated by the Stone Lock (Kamienna Śluza).

In 1997, the Marina Gdańsk (Polish: Przystań Jachtowa Marina Gdańsk) was created in the northern part of Nowa Motława. It has a length of 290 meters.

== Bridges ==
The Voivodeship road DW 501 is leading over the southern part of the Granary Island and both parts of the river Motława.

In 1864, Most Stągiewny at the Milk Can Gate (Brama Stągiewna) was reconstructed in steel. Between 1925 and 1945, it was used by the tramway.

The Mattenbuden Gate was served by the Most na Szopy (German: Mattenbudener Brücke). In 1945, the bridge was destroyed.

== See also ==
Media related to Nowa Motława at Wikimedia Commons

- Ołowianka and Stepka Channel
