= Carl von Halfern =

German lawyer, civil servant and politician (1873–1937)

Oberpräsident Province of Pomerania
- In office June 1930 – 1 October 1933
- Preceded by: Julius Lippmann
- Succeeded by: Rudolf zur Bonsen

Regierungspräsident Stettin
- In office 1 April 1927 – June 1930
- Preceded by: Leopold Höhnen
- Succeeded by: Hans Simons (de)

Regierungspräsident Hildesheim
- In office 1 October 1922 – 1 April 1927
- Preceded by: Wilhelm Kutscher
- Succeeded by: Leopold Höhnen

Additional positions
- 1933–1937: Prussian State Councilor
- 1916–1919: Landrat, Saarbrücken district
- 1911–1919: Provincial Landtag Deputy, Rhine Province
- 1909–1916: Landrat, Ottweiler district

Personal details
- Born: 8 April 1873 Burtscheid, Rhine Province, Kingdom of Prussia, German Empire
- Died: 20 October 1937 (aged 64) Wilmersdorf, Nazi Germany
- Resting place: Heißbergfriedhof; Burtscheid, Aachen
- Party: German People's Party
- Education: Doctor of Law
- Alma mater: University of Strassburg; Humboldt University of Berlin; University of Bonn; Friedrich-Alexander University of Erlangen
- Profession: Lawyer

Military service
- Allegiance: German Empire
- Branch/service: Royal Prussian Army
- Years of service: 1897–1898
- Rank: Rittmeister
- Unit: 5th (Westphalian) Uhlan Regiment
- Awards: Iron Cross, 2nd class

Carl (or Karl) Heinrich Gustav Julius von Halfern (8 April 1873 – 20 October 1937) was a German administrative lawyer who served in the civil service under the German Empire and the Weimar Republic. He was the district administrator of the Saarbrücken district (1916–19), the regional president of Hildesheim (1922–27) and of Stettin (1927–30) and the Oberpräsident of the Prussian Province of Pomerania (1930–33). A member of the German People's Party, he was removed from office shortly after the Nazi Party came to power.

== Early life ==
Born in Burtscheid (today, part of Aachen) the son of a cloth manufacturer, bank director and district administrator, Halfern attended the Kaiser-Karls-Gymnasium and the Kaiser-Wilhelm-Gymnasium (today, Einhard-Gymnasium) in Aachen. He obtained his Abitur in 1893 and then studied law at the University of Strassburg, the Humboldt University of Berlin and the University of Bonn. He was a member of the student corps Rhenania Strassburg. He passed his Referendar examination and began a legal clerkship at the district court at Eschweiler and the regional court at Aachen in September 1897. Halfern received his doctor of law degree in December 1897 at the Friedrich-Alexander University of Erlangen. He then performed his mandatory military service with the Royal Prussian Army as a one-year volunteer with the 5th (Westphalian) Uhlan Regiment, headquartered in Düsseldorf. He earned the Iron Cross 2nd class and was discharged with the rank of Rittmeister of reserves.

Halfern obtained an entry level legal position with the Prussian civil service at the Düsseldorf Regierungsbezirk (governmental district) in February 1900. Following completion of his Assessor examination in January 1903, he became a government Assessor at the Tarnowitz (today, Tarnowskie Góry) district office in the Province of Silesia where he remained until April 1906. He then took a leave of absence and undertook a study trip around the world, which took him to Canada, the United States, Mexico, Japan and China. In February 1907, he returned to work in the office of the Regierungspräsident (regional president) of Münster.

== Political career ==
From July 1909 to June 1916, Halfern was the Landrat (district administrator) in the Ottweiler district (today, the Neunkirchen district) and, from June 1916 to October 1919, he was the Landrat and police director in the Saarbrücken district, both of which were then part of the Prussian Rhine Province. From 1911 to 1919, he also sat as a member of the Rhenish provincial Landtag. After the end of the First World War and the conclusion of the Treaty of Versailles, the Prussian interior minister appointed Halfern as the Verwaltungspräsident (administrative president) for the French-occupied Territory of the Saar Basin on 2 October 1919. However, the French military administration removed him from office on 9 December and expelled him from the Saar Territory.

During the Weimar Republic, Halfern joined the German People's Party (DVP) in 1920 and remained a member until the party was disbanded in July 1933. In February 1920, he was appointed Ministerialrat (ministerial councilor) on the Privy Finance Council in the Prussian Ministry of Finance and served as general advisor for the implementation of the peace treaty. On 1 October 1922, Halfern succeeded Wilhelm Kutscher as Regierungspräsident in the Hildesheim Regional District, serving until 1 April 1927. He was then transferred to the same post in the Stettin Regional District where he remained until 1 April 1930. In June 1930, he was appointed Oberpräsident of the Province of Pomerania. He was also a member of the Kaiser Wilhelm Society.

After the Nazi seizure of power, as a Prussian Oberpräsident, Halfern was named on 11 July 1933 to the recently reconstituted Prussian State Council by Prussian Minister president Hermann Göring. However, soon he was placed on a leave of absence from his post in Pomerania and formally retired on 1 October 1933. However, he continued to sit as a member of the State Council and was also given a seat on the State Debt Committee in Berlin, holding both these positions until his death on 20 October 1937.

== Sources ==
- Carl von Halfern entry in Das Deutsche Führerlexikon 1934-1935
- Karl von Halfern entry in Saarland Biographie
- Lilla, Joachim (2005). Der Preußische Staatsrat 1921–1933: Ein biographisches Handbuch. Düsseldorf: Droste Verlag. ISBN 978-3-770-05271-4.
