= Samuel Echt =

German historian and teacher

Samuel Echt (17 July 1888 – 12 November 1974) was a German historian and teacher.

== Biography ==
Echt was born in Norgau, East Prussia, Germany (modern Medvedevo, Kaliningrad Oblast, Russia). He worked as a teacher and historian.

Echt was a leading member of the Jewish Community of Danzig after World War I. Echt was responsible for the organization of the Kindertransport from Danzig which allowed 124 children to emigrate to Western Europe.

In 1939, Echt emigrated to Great Britain, and in 1948 to the United States. He died in New York City.

== Publications ==
- Die Geschichte der Juden in Danzig, Rautenberg 1972, ISBN 978-3-7921-0095-0 (in German)
