= Ernst Siehr =

German lawyer and politician

Ernst Siehr (5 October 1869, Heinrichswalde, Province of Prussia – 14 November 1945, Bergen auf Rügen) was a German lawyer and politician. He served in the imperial Reichstag from 1912 to 1918 as a member of the Progressive People's Party. He represented the newly founded German Democratic Party in the Weimar National Assembly and briefly in the subsequently elected republican Reichstag. He then served as Oberpräsident of East Prussia from 1920 to 1932, when he was succeeded by Wilhelm Kutscher.
