= Danzig Ghetto =

Jewish ghetto in Danzig during the Holocaust

- Jewish ghetto
- Interactive map of Danzig Ghetto
- Coordinates: 54.3446°N 18.6585°E
- Location: Mausengasse 7 Speicherinsel, Danzig, Nazi Germany
- Operational: 1939–1945
- Number of inmates: 140 (1940)

The Danzig Ghetto was a Jewish ghetto located in Danzig (today Gdańsk), operational from 1939 to 1940 in a retirement home and from 1940 to 1945 in a former granary on Speicherinsel.

== History ==
Initially, the ghetto was located in a retirement home on Milchkannegasse, but was moved shortly after its creation to Mausengasse 7 on Speicherinsel. Arrests of Poles and Jews in the city took place as early as the morning of 1 September 1939. It was located inside a former granary, the Czerwona Mysz. Jews from cities other than Danzig, including Łódź and Budapest, were transported to the ghetto.

Unlike other ghettos in occupied Poland, the one in Danzig was confined purely to a single building, inhabited by approximately 140 people. From March 1941 to mid-1943, the inhabitants of the ghetto still left alive began being transported to the Theresienstadt and Warsaw Ghettos, from where they would be moved to death camps, including Auschwitz-Birkenau and Stutthof. Only 20 Jews from Danzig remained alive after the war.

Brutal conditions, a common characteristic of many other such ghettos operated by Nazi Germany, were present in the Danzig Ghetto as well. Many of the elderly in the ghetto died within months or weeks, being held in "camp-like" conditions.

During the aerial bombardments that accompanied the siege of Danzig in 1945, the building burnt down and the remaining inhabitants were moved to a home elsewhere in Danzig before the end of the war. On 7 December 2023, a small commemorative plaque was erected on the empty former site of the ghetto, with inscriptions in Polish, Hebrew, English, and German.

== See also ==
- Great Synagogue (Danzig)
- History of the Jews in Gdańsk
