= Israel Lipschitz =

Rabbi Yisrael Lifschitz
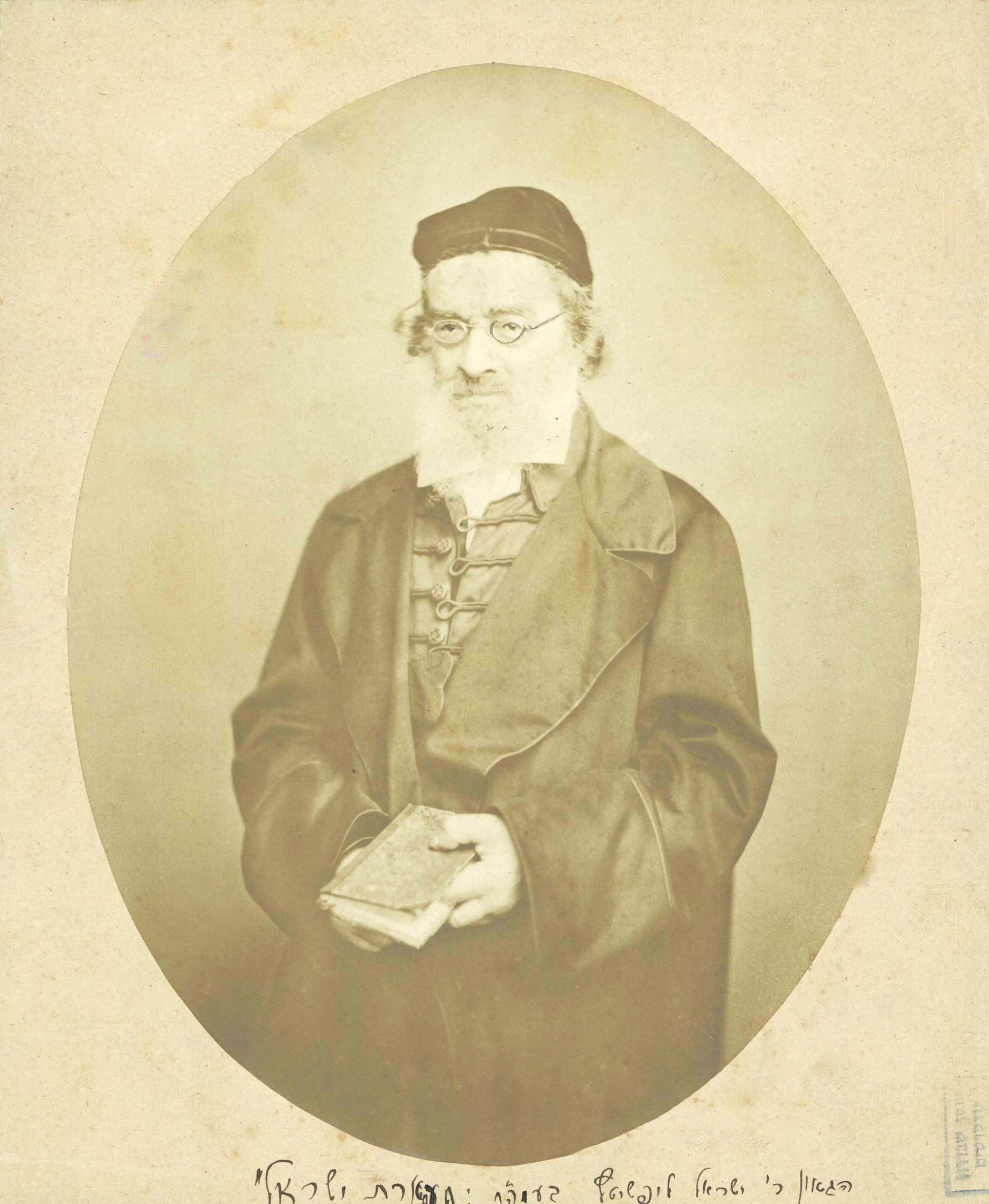
- Rabbi Yisrael Lifschitz
- Title: Rabbi

Personal life
- Born: 1782
- Died: 1860 (aged 77–78)
- Parent: Gedalia
- Notable work(s): Tiferes Yisrael, Derush Ohr HaChayim
- Known for: Tiferes Yisrael commentary on the Mishnah
- Occupation: Rabbi

Religious life
- Religion: Judaism

Senior posting
- Post: Rabbi of Dessau; Rabbi of Danzig

Yisrael Lifschitz (Hebrew: ישראל ליפשיץ; 1782–1860) was a leading 19th-century Ashkenazi rabbi, first in Dessau and then in the Jewish Community of Danzig. He was the author of the commentary "Tiferes Yisrael" on the Mishnah.

== Biography ==
Lipshitz's father's name was Gedalia.

Lipshitz led the life of an ascetic, frequently fasted three days in succession, and studied incessantly. His ethical will (published in Konigsberg in 1860 or 1861) contains twenty-eight paragraphs, consisting chiefly of moral and ascetic precepts. He left in manuscript many notes ("derashos") to the Shulchan Aruch and to Maimonides' (Rambam's) Mishneh Torah, a comprehensive treatise on the order Taharos, and many responsa.

== Works ==
Lipshitz was the author of Tiferes Yisrael, a well-known commentary on the Mishnah. The edition of the Mishnah containing this commentary is often referred to as "Mishnayos Yachin uBoaz". The commentary is divided into two parts, one more general and one more analytical, titled "Yachin" and "Boaz" respectively (after two large pillars in Solomon's Temple, the first Temple in Jerusalem).

He also wrote Derush Ohr HaChayim (Homily on the Light of Life) which debates the eternality of the soul and the age of the universe.
