= Julius Lippmann =

German politician (1864–1934)

City Councilor, Stettin
- In office 1900–1918

Prussian House of Representatives Deputy
- In office 1908–1918
- Constituency: Stettin

Weimar National Assembly Deputy
- In office 1919–1920

Oberpräsident, Province of Pomerania
- In office 1 April 1919 – 31 March 1930
- Preceded by: Georg Michaelis
- Succeeded by: Carl von Halfern

Personal details
- Born: 22 July 1864 Danzig, West Prussia, German Empire
- Died: 13 November 1934 (aged 70) Berlin, Nazi Germany
- Party: Free-minded Union; Progressive People's Party (Germany); German Democratic Party (DDP)
- Profession: Lawyer

Julius Lippmann (22 July 1864 – 13 November 1934) was a German liberal politician, a member of the Prussian House of Representatives and the Weimar National Assembly. He served as Oberpräsident (governor) of the Province of Pomerania from 1919 to 1930. After retiring from this post, he began lecturing at the University of Greifswald but left after being the subject of antisemitic attacks by Nazi students for his Jewish lineage.

== Life ==
Lippmann was born in Danzig, West Prussia, Kingdom of Prussia, his father was a Jewish cantor in the Jewish Community of Danzig. Lippmann attended the Academic Gymnasium Danzig and started to study classical philology at the University of Berlin, but soon switched to law.

Lippmann started to practise as a lawyer in Stettin (today, Szczecin) in 1892 as a member of the Free-minded Union, and he was elected to the city council of Stettin in 1900. He became a member of the Prussian House of Representatives in 1908 where he would serve until its dissolution in 1918. He joined the Progressive People's Party (DDP) in 1910 and was the deputy chairman of the DDP faction in the Prussian parliament. Lippmann was elected a member of the Weimar National Assembly on 19 January 1919. On 1 April 1919, he succeeded Georg Michaelis as "Oberpräsident" (governor) of the Province of Pomerania, the only liberal politician to hold this position.

In 1927, Lippmann became an honorary senator of the University of Greifswald. He retired on 31 March 1930 as Oberpräsident and started to lecture on administrative sciences in Greifswald later that year. Though Lippmann had converted to Lutheranism, he was attacked by Nazi students for his Jewish descent. In April 1933, Lippmann ceased his lectures and was formally dismissed on 25 July 1933 at his own request after he had received a Law for the Restoration of the Professional Civil Service questionnaire.

Facing further antisemitic persecution, Lippmann moved to Berlin, where he died in 1934.

== External website ==
- Julius Lippmann in the Akten der Reichskanzlei. Weimarer Republik
