= Heinrich Sahm =

German lawyer, politician and diplomat

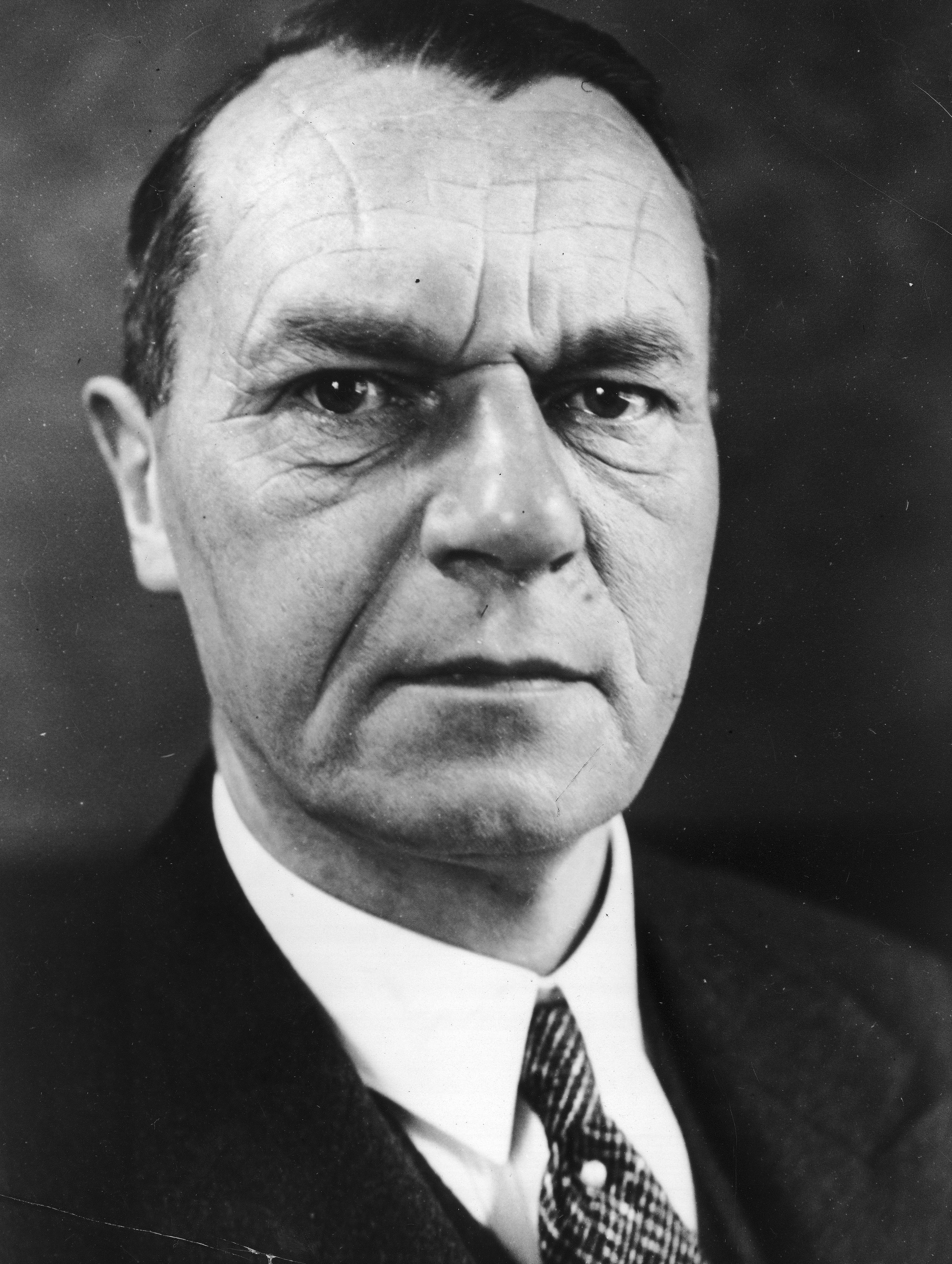
- Sahm in 1931

President of the Senate of the Free City of Danzig
- In office 6 December 1920 – 10 January 1931
- Preceded by: Position established
- Succeeded by: Ernst Ziehm

Mayor of Berlin
- In office 14 April 1931 – 9 December 1935
- Preceded by: Arthur Scholz
- Succeeded by: Oskar Maretzky

German Ambassador to Norway
- In office 11 May 1936 – 3 October 1939
- Preceded by: Heinrich Rohland
- Succeeded by: Curt Bräuer

Personal details
- Born: 12 September 1877 Anklam, Province of Pomerania, Kingdom of Prussia, German Empire
- Died: 3 October 1939 (aged 62) Oslo, Norway
- Party: Nazi Party (from 1933)
- Spouse: Dorothea (Dora)
- Profession: Lawyer, Politician, and Diplomat

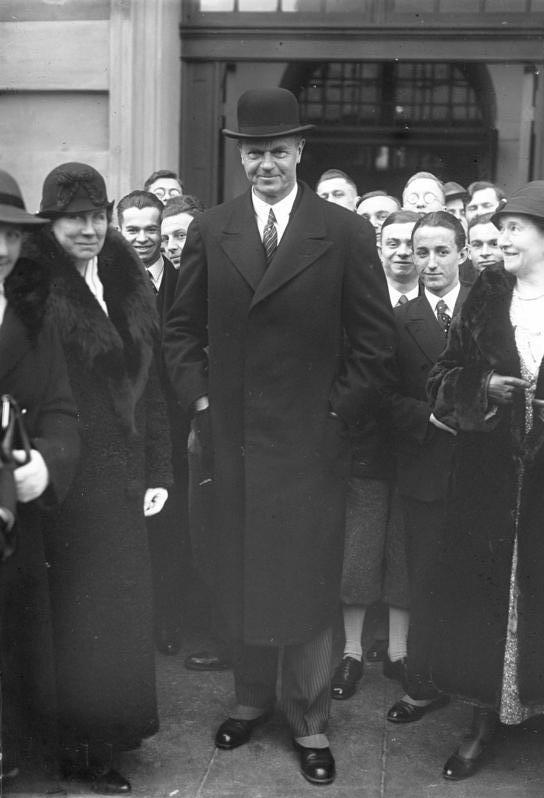
Heinrich Sahm, Berlin 1932

Heinrich Friedrich Wilhelm Martin Sahm (12 September 1877 – 3 October 1939) was a German lawyer, politician, and diplomat. He was the mayor of Danzig (today, Gdańsk) from 1919 and President of the Senate (head of government and chief of state) of the Free City of Danzig under League of Nations mandate from 1920 to 1931. Subsequently, he served as mayor of Berlin until 1935, and joined the Nazi Party in 1933. From 1936 until his death, Sahm served as the ambassador of the German Reich to Norway.

== Early life ==
Sahm was the younger son of Heinrich Alexander Sahm (1837–1901), a needle maker (manufacturer of needles and pins) and Shopkeeper, and Wilhelmina née Schußmann (1843–1920). His elder brother Johannes (1876–1927) ran a haberdashery shop in his hometown after his parents. Sahm studied law and political science at the Ludwig-Maximilians-Universität München, the Humboldt University of Berlin and the University of Greifswald. In 1900, he passed the referendary exam in Szczecin, and in 1904 the assessor's exam in Berlin. He worked in municipal boards in Szczecin and Magdeburg. In the years 1912 to 1918, he was the second mayor in Bochum, at the same time from 1915 to 1918 (by order of the Reich Internal Affairs) he was the director of the office of the president of the police in Warsaw. He dealt with the issue of food supply to the population. After 1918 (mainly for lack of food supplies), he was entered by the Polish authorities on the list of war criminals, which was largely a political and propaganda move (deleted by the Polish side from this list in May 1920 under the influence of the High Commissioner of the League of Nations Reginald Tower and General Commissioner of the Republic of Poland in the Free City of Danzig Maciej Biesiadecki ). In July 1918, he became the chairman of the congress of representatives of German and Prussian cities.

== Political career in Danzig ==
After the death of Heinrich Scholz, he was elected Mayor of Danzig on 2 February 1919, and after the establishment of the Second Free City of Danzig, he was elected the first president of the Senate, the highest governing and executive body, the equivalent of the government. While still mayor, on 24 January 1920, he said goodbye to the German troops of the Danzig garrison.

Formally non-partisan, however, he was closer to center-right than left-wing groups. His position was indirectly strengthened by party fragmentation in the Volkstag, the Parliament of the Free City of Danzig. In 1919, he participated in talks in Paris on the future status of the Free City of Danzig. He effectively opposed the plans of transporting General Józef Haller's army to Poland via Danzig, fearing that the Polish side would strengthen its influence in the city. In 1924, he received the honorary doctorate Technische Hochschule Danzig, in 1928 the University of Königsberg and in the same year honorary membership in the Senate of the University of Tübingen (Tübingen). In this way, his efforts in maintaining the German character of Danzig were also appreciated.

In his activities, he primarily had in mind the interests of the Free City of Danzig, which he clearly expressed during a speech in Hamburg in October 1927, when he demanded that the authorities of the Weimar Republic conclude a trade treaty with Poland. He was active in contacts with foreign countries, his trips were aimed at both fostering the growth of trade and emphasizing the distinctiveness of the Free City of Danzig. In 1921 and 1930 he paid visits to Warsaw, in 1929 to Moscow and Kharkiv, he participated several dozen times in meetings of the League of Nations in Geneva, where he enjoyed the trust of many diplomats.

Striving to improve the economic situation of the Free City of Danzig, he tried to maintain and even deepen Danzig's multiple ties with the German state, he sought to increase the independence of the Free City of Danzig and weaken the position of the Republic of Poland in it. On many occasions he emphasized the German character of Danzig. He was, like almost all Danzig Germans, a supporter of a peaceful revision of the Polish-German border and the incorporation of the Free City of Danzig area into the German state. He maintained good contacts with the German authorities; one of his chancellors, Hans Luther, was his longtime friend. He also cooperated with the German Ministry of Foreign Affairs (Auswärtiges Amt) and its representative office in the Free City of Danzig, especially with the German Consul General, Edmund Freiherr von Therman. However, he was against moves bearing the hallmarks of political adventures.

He enjoyed great prestige among the Germans in Danzig and in the 1920s he was the most influential politician in Danzig. He was a guarantor of the continuity of the Free City of Danzig political line and the stabilization of the local political scene. He was able to cooperate not only with bourgeois parties, but also with the centre-left Senate. Although on 19 December 1928, he was elected president of the Senate for the third time by the Volkstag, but after the parliamentary elections of 16 November 1930, despite the support of national liberals, he had to resign from his position. His concept of a cross-party president was not accepted by, among others, the Nazi Party, and he did not receive support for his plans to strengthen the president's position from other political parties sitting in the Volkstag. He did not accept the offer to become a senator in the Free City of Danzig.

== Mayor of Berlin ==
On 14 April 1931, Sahm was elected as Oberbürgermeister of Berlin; he would be the last freely elected mayor until after the end of the Second World War. On 20 April 1932, he also was made the Berlin plenipotentiary to the Reichsrat where he served until its abolition on 14 February 1934. Following the Nazi seizure of power in 1933, the administration of Berlin was put into the hands of a Nazi Party functionary, Staatskommissar (State Commissioner) Julius Lippert. Sahm largely cooperated in the dismissal of Jews and Social Democrats from the city administration. He became a founding member of Hans Frank's Academy for German Law on 2 October 1933 and joined the Nazi Party in November of that year. He was named Berlin's representative on the Prussian Provincial Council on 16 October 1934, and was appointed to the Prussian State Council by Prussian Minister President Hermann Göring in 1935.

Despite all this, he was still viewed with suspicion by the Party hierarchy. In November 1935, he was brought before the Supreme Party Court on charges that he had made two household purchases from a Jewish-owned department store. He was found guilty on 25 November and his expulsion from the Party was ordered. Although this action was overturned by express order of Adolf Hitler on 5 December, Sahm submitted his resignation as Oberburgermeister on 9 December. On 11 May 1936, he was appointed as the German ambassador to Norway. He died in Oslo on 3 October 1939. He is buried together with his wife at the Forest Cemetery (Waldfriedhof) in Dahlem (Berlin) (in 1997 transformed into the Garden-Monument (Gartendenkmal)), there is also a plaque commemorating his son Detlef at the grave.

== Family ==
From 1906 he was married to Dorothea (Dora) (23 June 1883 – 8 February 1964), daughter of Heinrich Rolffs (1846–1932), a Pharmacist from Weidenau (North Rhine-Westphalia) and Szczecin, and Adela née Tiemann (1850–1932) . He had two daughters and two sons: Marianne (1907–1988), whose husband Ulrich-Wilhelm Graf Schwerin von Schwanenfeld (born 1902) was executed in 1944 after the assassination attempt on Adolf Hitler; Gundel, whose husband was a building adviser; Detlef (born 1910), killed in Russia in 1941, and Ulrich (13 October 1917 Bochum – 22 August 2005 Bodenwerder), raised in Gdańsk, doctor of law, arrested in 1944 by the Gestapo after the assassination attempt on Hitler, later a leading West German diplomat, in 1972–1977 ambassador in Moscow, 1977–1979 in Ankara and until his retirement in 1982 in Geneva.

Some of his memories from Gdańsk were published posthumously by the Herder Institute in Marburg (Erinnerungen aus meinen Danziger Jahren 1919-1930, Marburg/ Lahn 1958). Due to his height (over 2 m), a floating crane was jokingly named "Long Henry" in his honor, built in 1905, until 1945 functioning in the Gdańsk Schichau Shipyard (now in the museum in Museum of Rostock).

== Sources ==
- "BERLIN MAYOR PUT ON TRIAL BY NAZIS: Party Court Acts on Charge That Sahm Made Purchases From Jewish-Owned Store". The New York Times. 14 November 1935. p. 1.
- Lilla, Joachim (2005). Der Preußische Staatsrat 1921–1933: Ein biographisches Handbuch. Düsseldorf: Droste Verlag. ISBN 978-3-770-05271-4.
- Zentner, Christian; Bedürftig, Friedemann, eds. (1997) [1991]. The Encyclopedia of the Third Reich. New York: Da Capo Press. pp. 827–828. ISBN 978-0-306-80793-0.
- Heinrich Sahm entry in the Deutsche Biographie
- Newspaper clippings about Heinrich Sahm in the 20th Century Press Archives of the ZBW
