= Wilhelm Böckmann =

German architect (1832–1902)

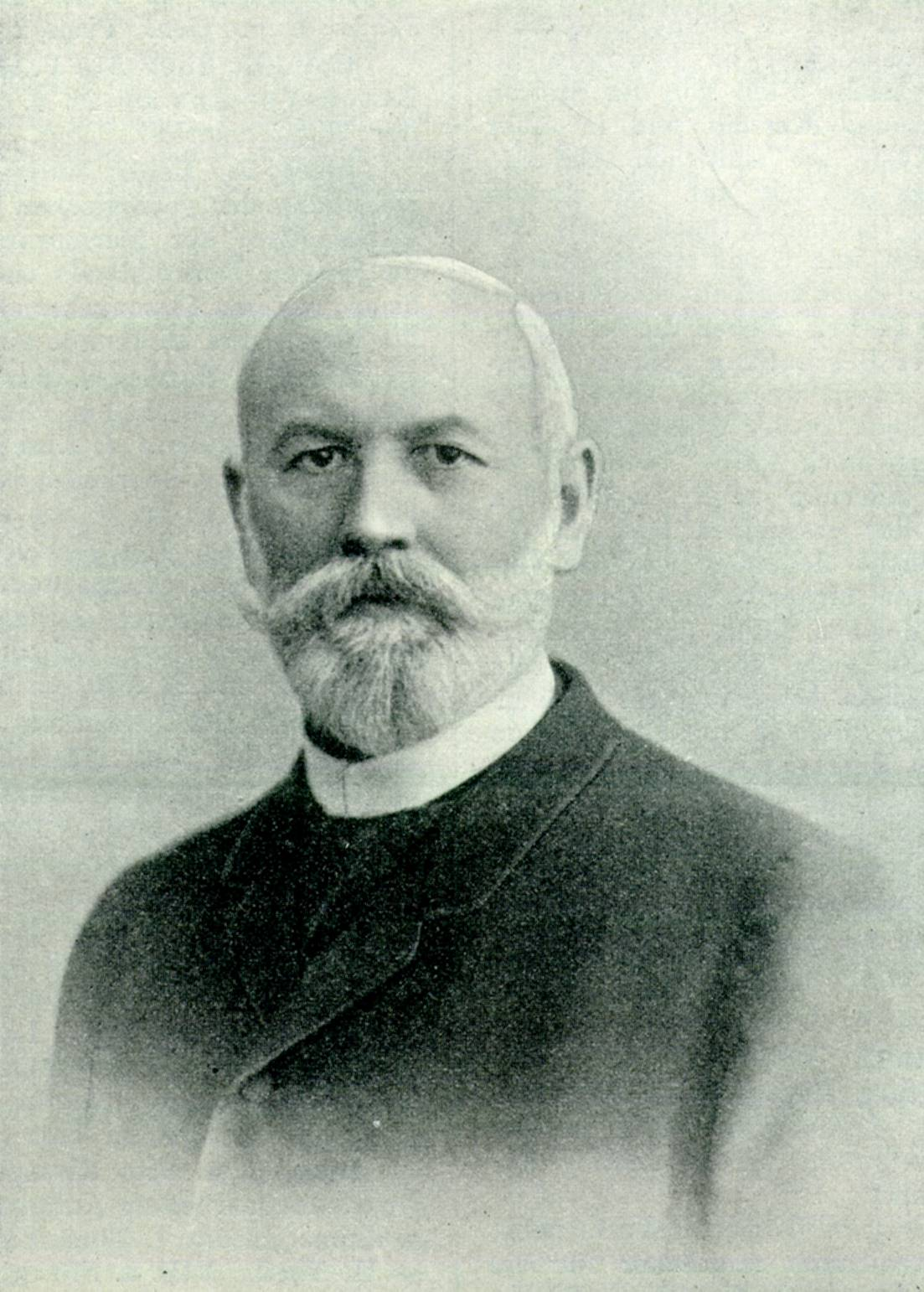
- Wilhelm Böckmann
- Born: 29 January 1832; Elberfeld, Germany
- Died: 22 October 1902 (aged 70); Berlin, Germany
- Education: Bauakademie
- Occupation: Architect
- Practice: Böckmann and Ende

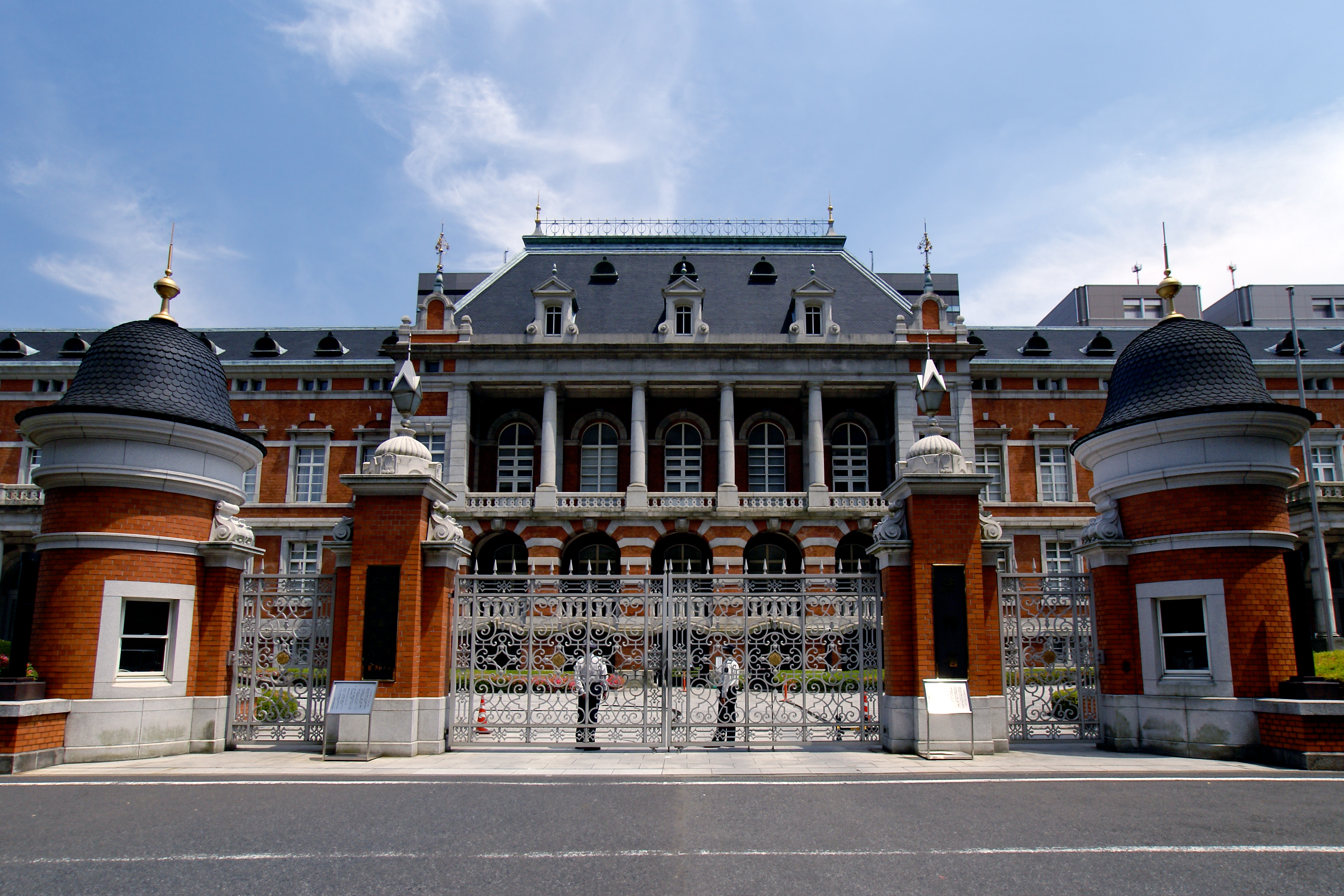
The Ministry of Justice Building in Tokyo

Wilhelm Böckmann (29 January 1832 – 22 October 1902) was a German architect who worked briefly as a foreign advisor to the government of Meiji period Japan.

== Early career ==
Böckmann was born in Elberfeld, near Wuppertal, Germany where his father was a teacher of mathematics. He initially entered the Gymnasium to follow in his father’s footsteps, but dropped out after two years to complete an apprenticeship as a carpenter. In 1854, he entered the Bauakademie, in Berlin, an architectural school housed in what is considered one of the forerunners of modern architecture due to its theretofore uncommon use of red brick and a relatively streamlined façade. His studies were interrupted for a year by military service, and by another year spent travelling abroad with his friend Hermann Ende. In 1859, he passed his First State Examination with high marks. He established the architectural firm, “Böckmann and Ende” in 1860.

In 1864 Böckmann was invited to speak before the Paris Institute of Architects. In 1868, he founded a technical journal, the Deutsche Bauzeitung. He became chairman of the Architects and Engineers Association in Berlin from 1869.

Most of the buildings he designed were in the neighborhood of Berlin, especially villas in district of Tiergarten, with many found within the diplomatic quarter. He was also active in the residential areas of Potsdam Neubabelsberg and designed various buildings for the Berlin Zoo. Few of these buildings have survived World War II.

== Career in Japan ==
Böckmann was invited to Japan by the Meiji government in 1887 to develop a plan to rebuild Tokyo into a modern national capital. He spent two months investigating the terrain and put together a draft plan with an outline for a new Ministry of Justice building. His plan was a magnificent Baroque city comparable to Paris or Berlin, but he left Japan with the Japanese authorities gasping at the tremendous budget which would be required. His visit was followed in 1887 by his partner, Hermann Ende, who brought designs for other governmental buildings, including the Ministry of Justice and a new Diet building.

However, the project was soon derailed by Inoue Kaoru for budgetary reasons, as well as a growing cultural backlash in Japan against mimicking Western architecture. Ende was sent home and plans for a branch office of Böckmann and Ende in Tokyo came to an end. The Japanese government, however, did keep his designs for the new Ministry of Justice building, which was completed in 1895, albeit by another company.

Back in Germany, Böckmann continued his architectural design work. He became Berlin Zoo Association Director in 1893 and President from 1897. Böckmann was made an Honorary Member of Institute of Architects in 1902, and died later the same year in Berlin.

== Noted works ==
- 1864–1865: Old Synagogue (Elberfeld), (rebuilt in 1938: destroyed)
- 1867: Bank HF Lehmann in Halle, Saxony-Anhalt
- 1871–1874: Prussian Soil Bank in Berlin
- 1872–1874: Deutsche Union-Bank in Berlin
- 1873: several buildings in the Berlin Zoological Garden (e.g., Elephant House, antelopes, big cat house)
- 1875: "Oak Castle" for Baron Saint Paul in the Hirschberger Valley (Silesia)
- 1875–1876: Architects Association of Berlin (1934; demolished)
- 1876–1877: Café Bauer in Berlin
- 1881–1885: Museum of Ethnology in Berlin
- 1882–1883: Helms Café in Berlin
- 1883: House of the Estates of West Prussia (Landeshaus), Danzig
- 1883: Sedan panorama at Berlin Alexanderplatz station
- 1884–1886: Residential house Voßstraße 33 in Berlin (Böckmann lived in this building. Later, after a conversion and extension in the 1930s - opposite Hitler had the former Reich Chancellery built - the Palais served the Deutsche Reichsbahn as an administrative building until 1989.)
- 1885: "Schiess'sches House" in Magdeburg
- 1885–1887: Great Synagogue in Danzig
- 1895: Justice Department in Tokyo, Japan
