= Hermann Ende =

German architect (1829–1907)

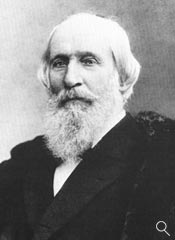
- Born: 4 March 1829; Landsberg an der Warthe, Prussia
- Died: 10 August 1907 (aged 78); Wannsee, Germany
- Education: Bauakademie
- Occupation: Architect
- Practice: Böckmann & Ende

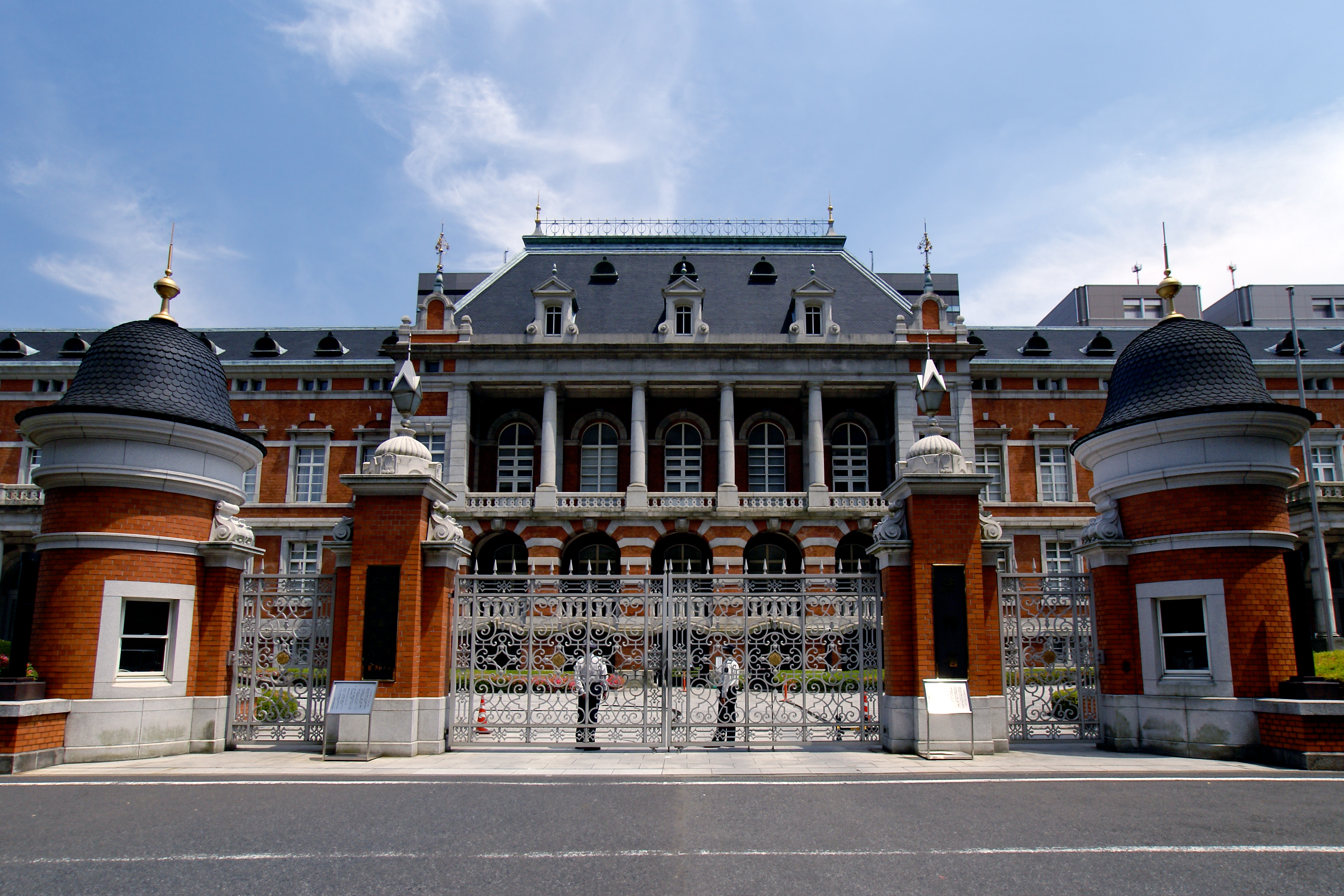
Old Ministry of Justice in Tokyo

Hermann Gustav Louis Ende (4 March 1829 – 10 August 1907) was a German architect noted for his work in Germany, Japan and elsewhere.

== Biography ==
Ende was born in Landsberg an der Warthe, Province of Brandenburg, Prussia (modern-day Gorzów Wielkopolski, Poland). In 1836 he moved with family to Berlin, where, after graduating from the Köllnisches Gymnasium in 1852, he studied architecture at the Bauakademie, a Berlin architectural school housed in what is considered one of the forerunners of modern architecture due to its theretofore uncommon use of red brick and a relatively streamlined façade. His studies were interrupted for a year by military service, and by another year spent travelling abroad with his friend Wilhelm Böckmann. In 1860, he established the architectural firm, “Böckmann & Ende”, which came to be considered one of the leading design studios in Berlin.

From 1874, he was a member of the Prussian Academy of Arts (Berlin), and in 1878 he became a professor at the Bauakademie in Berlin, as well as the Technische Hochschule Charlottenburg. From 1895 to 1904 was the President of the Academy of Arts.

Ende exercised a considerable influence upon the development of architecture in Berlin. The numerous buildings constructed by him were in the neighbourhood of Berlin, especially villas in locality of Tiergarten, with many found within the diplomatic quarter. He was also active in the residential areas of Potsdam Neubabelsberg and designed various buildings for the Berlin Zoo. Few of these buildings have survived World War II.

Böckmann was invited to Japan by the Meiji government in 1887 to develop a plan to rebuild Tokyo into a modern national capital. He spent two months investigating the terrain and put together a draft plan with an outline for a new Supreme Court building. He plan was for a magnificent Baroque city comparable to Paris or Berlin, but he left Japan with the Japanese authorities gasping at the tremendous budget which would be required. His visit was followed in 1887 by his partner, Ende, who brought designs for other governmental buildings, including the Ministry of Justice building and a new Diet building.

However, the project was soon derailed by Inoue Kaoru for budgetary reasons, as well as a growing cultural backlash in Japan against mimicking Western architecture. Ende was sent home and plans for a branch office of Böckmann and Ende in Tokyo came to an end. The Japanese government, however, did keep his designs for the new Ministry of Justice building, which was completed in 1895, albeit by another company.

Back in Germany, Ende continued his architectural design work. He died in 1907 at Wannsee.

== Noted Works ==
- 1864-1865: Synagogue, Elberfeld (1938 destroyed)
- 1867: Bank H. F. Lehmann, Halle (Saale)
- 1871-1874: Prussian Soil Bank, Berlin
- 1872-1874: Deutsche Union-Bank, Berlin
- 1873: several buildings in the Berlin Zoological Garden, e.g. elephant house, antelopes house, big cat house
- 1875: "Eichen-Schloss" (Oak Castle) for Baron von Saint Paul near Fischbach, Riesengebirge, Silesia
- 1875–1876: Architekten-Verein zu Berlin (Architects Association of Berlin) (1934 demolished)
- 1876: House of Benjamins, Riga
- 1876–1877: Café Bauer, Berlin
- 1881–1885: Museum of Ethnology, Berlin
- 1882–1883: Café Helms, Berlin
- 1883: Ständehaus (House of the West Prussian Estates) in Danzig
- 1883: Sedan panorama near Berlin Alexanderplatz station
- 1884–1886: dwelling house Voßstraße 33, Berlin (now HQ of German railways)
- 1885: "Schiess'sches Haus", Magdeburg
- 1885–1887: Great Synagogue in Danzig
- 1895: Ministry of Justice (Japan) in Tokyo
