= Granary Island =

Island in Poland

Native name: Wyspa Spichrzów
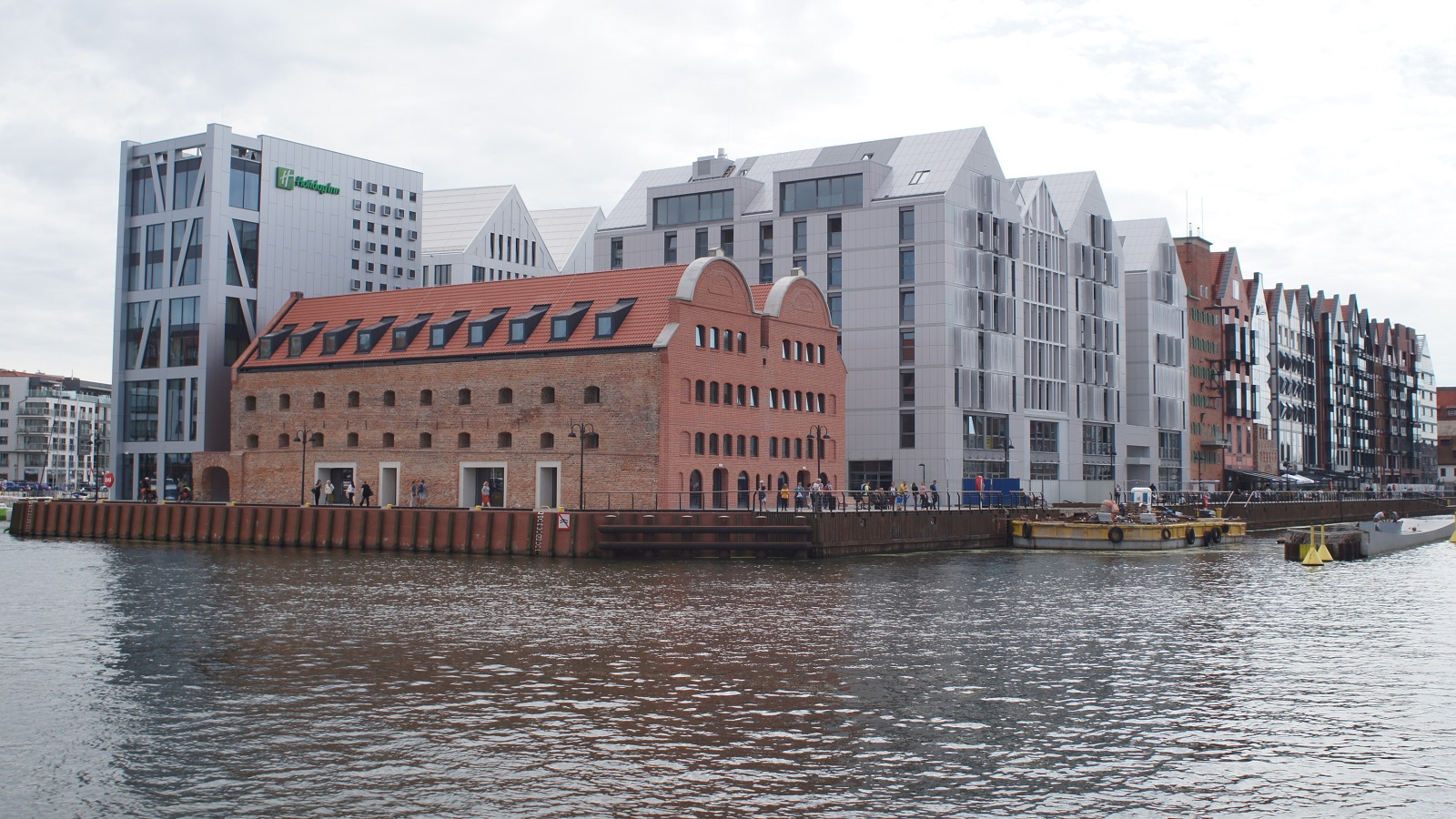
- Northern part of Granary Island as seen from the Motława
- Interactive map of Granary Island
- Etymology: Polish spichrz (granary)

Geography
- Location: Motława, Nowa Motława
- Coordinates: 54.346514°N 18.658569°E
- Adjacent to: Vistula
- Area: 24 ha (59 acres)

Administration
- Poland
- Voivodeship: (Pomeranian Voivodeship) Pomeranian
- City: Gdańsk

Granary Island (Polish: Wyspa Spichrzów, German: Speicherinsel, Kashubian: Spichrze) is an island in the district (dzielnica) Śródmieście of the city of Gdańsk, Poland. It is located east of the Main City. The island is enclosed by the Motława from the west and New Motława from the east. It is one of the two islands located on the Motława, alongside Ołowianka in the north.

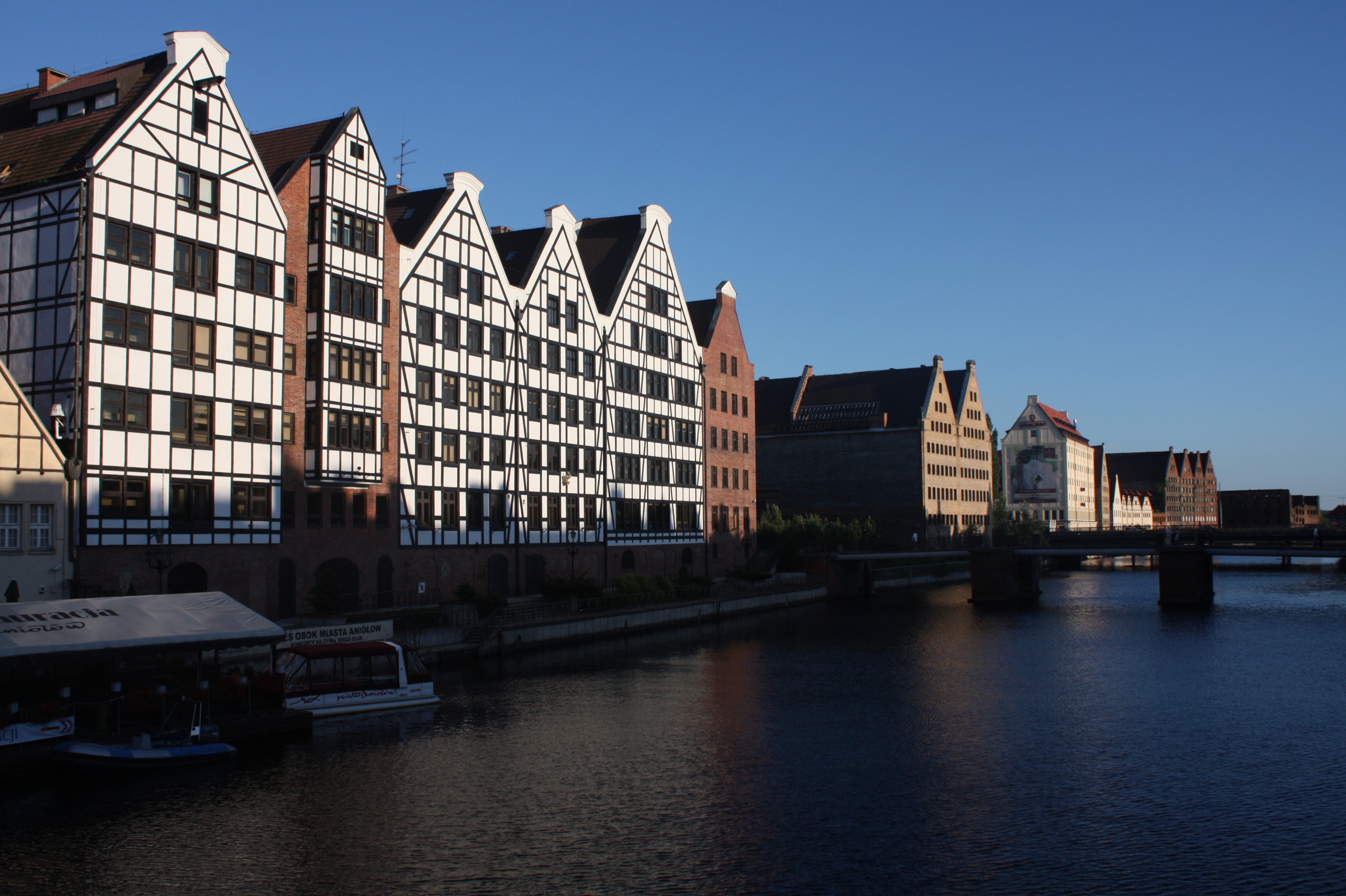
Old granaries on the southern part

== History ==
The Motława river is the oldest part of the trade port. On the eastern bank granaries had been erected since the 14th century. The number was growing up to 300. The island was created when the New Motława was dug out in 1576. In the Second World War, most of the granaries on the northern part were demolished during the siege of Danzig in March 1945. During the war, from 1940 to 1945, the small Danzig Ghetto operated out of a building on the island.

== Bridges and tourist attractions ==
The Voivodeship road DW 501 runs over the southern part of the island and both parts of the river Motława.

Bridges over the Motława:

- Two bridges to Toruńska street
- Most Krowi (Cow Bridge) to Cow Gate
- Zielony Most (Green Bridge) to Green Gate and Long Market
- A swing bridge (Kładka św. Ducha) for pedestrians was mounted in 2019 and opened in 2020.

Bridge over the New Motława:

- Most Stągiewny from Milk can Gate

Historical buildings:

- Brama Stągiewna (Milk can Gate), erected between 1517 and 1519
- granary Błękitny Baranek (Blue Lamb), erected in the 16th and 18th centuries, with elements from 1360; part of the Archaeological Museum
- granary Deo Gloria, integrated in the modern front of buildings

== See also ==
- Islands of Gdańsk
- Mill Island, Bydgoszcz
- Grudziądz Granaries
