= Festival of Jewish Culture in Warsaw =

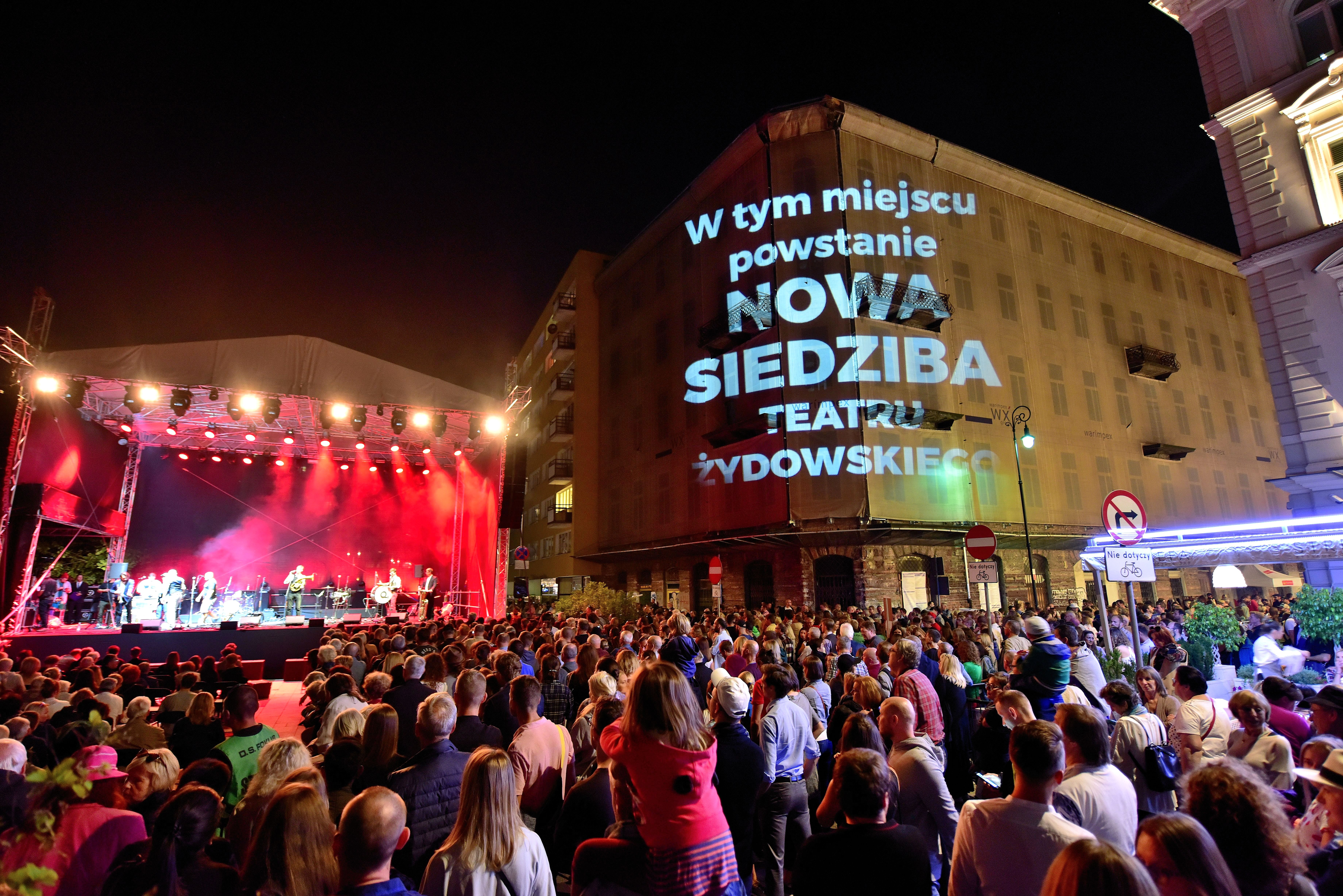
Klezmer Night concert in Grzybowski Square during 15th Singer Warsaw Festival (2018)

Festival of Jewish Culture in Warsaw – "Singer's Warsaw" is an annual celebration of Jewish culture that has been held in Warsaw since 2004.

The Festival includes Jewish (both Hebrew and Yiddish) theater, music, films, exhibits and expositions. It attempts to recreate Jewish culture from the period of interwar Poland, complete with historical buildings and atmosphere. Regular features include kosher food (along with instructions as to how to prepare it in one's own kitchen), dancing, songs, crafts, ceramics and posters. Numerous workshops, discussion groups and seminars are also held on topics related to Yiddish culture.

The festival is organized by the Polish-Israeli-American Shalom Foundation, which began in 1988 on the initiative of Gołda Tencer, an actress and producer of the Jewish Theatre in Warsaw. The purpose of the foundation is the popularization of Jewish culture in Poland, and the remembrance of its Jewish communities.

The first annual festival was held in 2004 on the 100th anniversary of the birthday of Isaac Bashevis Singer (note that Singer's actual birth date is uncertain).

The logo of the festival consists of a combination of a fiddler on a rooftop (to symbolize Polish Jewish culture) and that of the Warsaw Syrenka (to symbolize Warsaw). It was designed by Lech Majewski.

The 2009 festival was held from the 29 August until 6 September. Guests and participants included: Nigel Kennedy David Krakauer and Klezmer Madness!, the Gorale folk band Zakopower, Benzion Miller, Kroke, the author Hanna Krall, Michał Piróg, Trombenik, Janusz Tylman, Israel's ambassador to Poland Zvi Rav-Ner and many others.

== See also ==
- Baltic Days of Jewish Culture
- Jewish Culture Festival in Kraków
