= Great Synagogue (Danzig) =

Synagogue of the Jewish Community of Danzig

Great Synagogue in Danzig
- German: Neue Synagoge; Polish: Wielka Synagoga
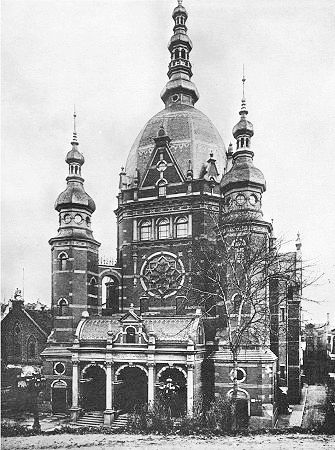
- The former Great Synagogue in Danzig (Gdańsk)

- Location of the former synagogue in modern Poland

Religion
- Affiliation: Reform Judaism (former)
- Ecclesiastical or organizational status: Synagogue (1887–1939)
- Status: Demolished

Location
- Location: Danzig
- Country: German Empire (1885–1918); Weimar Republic (1918–1920); Free City of Danzig (1920–1939)
- Interactive map of Great Synagogue in Danzig
- Coordinates: 54°20′53.10″N 18°38′51.21″E

Architecture
- Architects: Wilhelm Böckmann; Hermann Ende
- Style: Neo-Renaissance
- Completed: 1887
- Demolished: May 1939

Specifications
- Capacity: 2,000 worshipers
- Dome: One
- Spire: Two

The Great Synagogue (German: Neue Synagoge, Polish: Wielka Synagoga), was a synagogue of the Jewish Community of Danzig in the city of Danzig, in what was then the German Empire, later the Free City of Danzig, and is now Gdańsk, Poland. It was built in 1885–1887 on Reitbahnstraße, now Bogusławski Street. It was the largest synagogue in the city, and was demolished by the Free City authorities in May 1939.

== Design ==
The synagogue was built in the Neo-Renaissance style on the basis of a long rectangle. It was one of the most distinctive buildings in Danzig, with its large dome, two towers and a lantern seen at night. In the middle of a front row there was a large stained glass window with the Star of David, and all spires were topped with meshed Stars of David.

The spacious interior was topped with a sail vault, from which enormous chandeliers were hung. The main chamber was located underneath the dome. The Aron Kodesh ark was on a pedestal behind a parokhet curtain in an apse. Above the ark, the tables of the Decalog were supported by two stone lions. Behind it were large organs and the choir of 100 members. The bimah was behind the pedestal.

Over 2000 people could participate in the services. In the main chamber there were two rows of benches for over 1600 people. Along the sidewalls and over the western entrance there were massive arcade galleries for over 300 women, supported by multi-sided pillars. The walls were decorated with motifs of plants, geometric symbols and Biblical verses. The entire synagogue had electric heating and lighting, relatively uncommon in the late 19th century.

== History ==
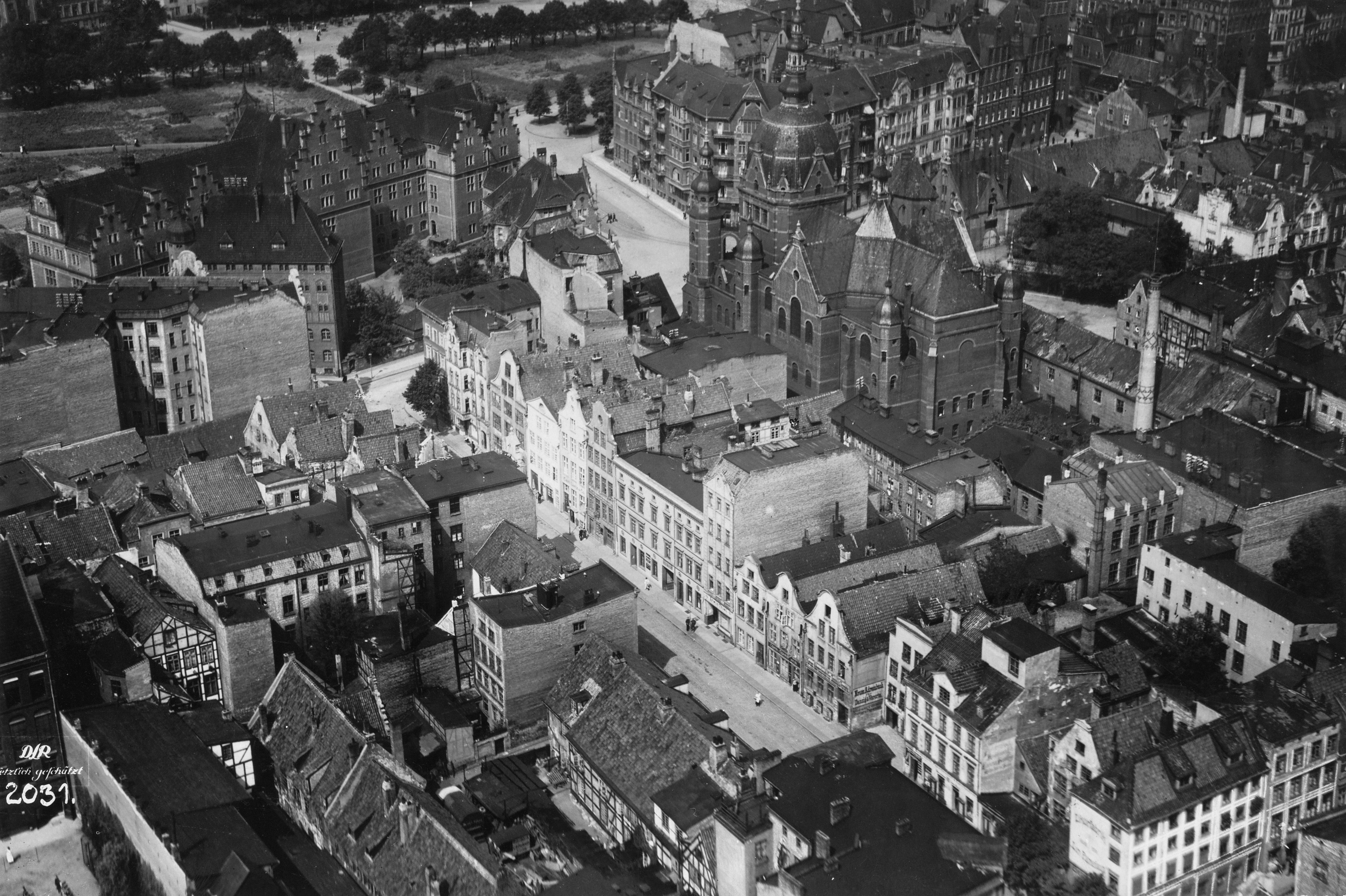
Aerial photo taken about 1920, showing the Great Synagogue from the rear

The synagogue was financed by the five reform communities: Altschottland (modern Stary Szkoty), Weinberg (modern Winnicka), Langfuhr (modern Wrzeszcz), Danzig-Breitgasse (modern Szeroka) and Danzig-Mattenbuden (modern Szopy). It was built by a company from Berlin, Ende & Böckmann, chosen by the city council.

It was opened with a ceremony on 15 September 1887, by the Danzig rabbi Kossman Werner, in the presence of the city council and the faithful. The scrolls of Torah were transported in from the Old Synagogue and two other synagogues (the Great Synagogue was seen as a building uniting the Danzig Jews), placed in the Aron Kodesh and the Eternal Light was lit. The first service was held on 8 December 1887.

At the beginning of the 20th century the synagogue became one of the most notable centres of Reform Judaism. A large museum of Judaism contained many rare and old items, particularly the collection of Lesser Giełdziński. Many concerts were held here, and rabbis and professors from all around the world gave lectures.

The 1920s saw the rising antisemitism and the increasing strength of the Nazi Party in Germany. Danzig was closely tied to Germany, from which it was officially separated by the Treaty of Versailles, and it became an increasingly unpleasant place for Jews, particularly after March 1933, when the local Nazi party won control of the city government. The synagogue thereafter was a target of two arson attempts. Both were stopped by a local militia formed by the local Jewish population to protect the building in concert with the Danzig police, who feared that any negligence of the attacks on Jews would lead to a Polish intervention. While the Constitution of the Free City of Danzig offered Danzig Jews greater protection than their brethren in Germany, Nazi sympathizers invaded the synagogue in August 1938 and trampled the Torah scrolls. The communities' leaders decided to safeguard some of their relics – the archives were shipped to Jerusalem, the library to Vilnius, and the museum to the United States. At the same time, mounting fiscal pressure forced the synagogue to sell the organs to Kraków, candlesticks to Warsaw, and the benches to Nowy Port. This was not enough, and in early 1939 the synagogue was sold to the senate of Danzig. On 15 April 1939, the last service was held in the building, and soon thereafter the senate took control. A banner was hung on a fence surrounding the building with the text: "Come, lovely May, and free us from the Jews". On 2 May, the Nazi-dominated government began demolishing the building.

After the German invasion of Poland on 1 September 1939, Nazi troops moved into the city, eradicating any resistance and claiming the city for Germany. During the Second World War most of the Jews of Danzig were murdered in the Holocaust after living in the Danzig Ghetto. Survivors mostly left Europe to settle in Israel.

There are no realistic plans to rebuild the synagogue. Much of the site of the synagogue is vacant; part of the land is held by the new Gdańsk community, and part belongs to the Urząd Ochrony Państwa (Office for State Protection). On the rest, however, a theatre has been built. The Gdańsk Shakespeare Theatre opened in September 2014.

== See also ==
- History of the Jews in Poland
- List of active synagogues in Poland
