= Bernhard Kamnitzer =

German jurist and Senator

- Born: 25 October 1890; Dirschau, West Prussia, German Empire
- Died: 15 July 1959 (aged 68); New York City, United States
- Education: Königliche Technische Hochschule zu Danzig
- Alma mater: University of Königsberg
- Occupation: Jurist
- Political party: Social Democratic Party of the Free City of Danzig
- Other political affiliations: CV
- Military service
- Allegiance: German Empire
- Conflict: WWI

Bernhard Kamnitzer (25 October 1890 – 15 July 1959) was a German jurist and Senator of the Free City of Danzig.

== Biography ==
Kamnitzer was born in Dirschau, he studied law at the Universities of Danzig and Königsberg. Kamnitzer served in World War I and was severely wounded, he later worked as a lawyer and a judge in Free City of Danzig. He was a member of the executive board of the Centralverein deutscher Staatsbürger jüdischen Glaubens, of the Social Democratic Party of the Free City of Danzig and the Danzig parliament in 1924-28. He was Senator (minister) for Finances of the Free City of Danzig between 1928 and 1931. In 1938 Kamnitzer emigrated to Great Britain and later to the United States, where he became President of the American Danzig Association.

Kamnitzer died in New York City.
