= Baltic Days of Jewish Culture =

Baltic Days of Jewish Culture (Polish: Bałtyckie Dni Kultury Żydowskiej) is an annual two-day festival of Jewish culture which takes place in Gdańsk, Poland at the beginning of June. The festival has been held since 1999.

The activities available during the festival include concerts, seminars, Hebrew lessons, exhibitions, meetings with prominent authors, and readings of Hebrew poetry. The festival is organized by the Social and Cultural Organization of Jews in Poland (Towarzystwo Społeczno-Kulturalne Żydów w Polsce).

== See also ==
- Festival of Jewish Culture in Warsaw
- Jewish Culture Festival in Kraków
