= Ołowianka =

Island in Eastern Pomerania, Poland

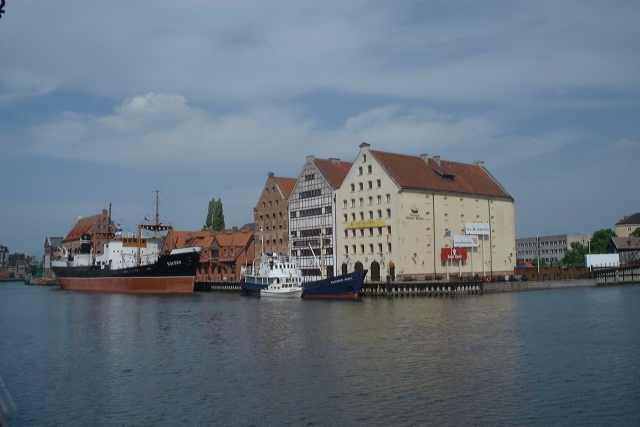
- Ołowianka in 2001 as seen from the Long Shore

- Location of Ołowianka within Śródmieście, Gdańsk
- Etymology: Polish ołów (lead)

Geography
- Location: Motława
- Coordinates: 54.3521°N 18.6603°E
- Adjacent to: Vistula
- Area: 5.21 ha (12.9 acres)

Administration
- Poland
- Voivodeship: (Pomeranian Voivodeship) Pomeranian
- City: Gdańsk
- District: Śródmieście

Additional information
- Time zone: CET (UTC+1)
  - Summer (DST): CEST (UTC+2)
- Vehicle registration: GD

Historic Monument of Poland
- Designated: 1994-09-08
- Part of: Gdańsk – city within the 17th-century fortifications
- Reference no.: M.P. 1994 nr 50 poz. 415

Ołowianka is an island located east of the city center in Gdańsk, Poland. The island is enclosed by the Motława from the north and west and Stepka Channel from the east. It is one of the two islands located on the Motława, alongside Granary Island.
