= Danziger Echo =

Newspaper

Danziger Echo was a Zionist Jewish newspaper in the Free City of Danzig, edited by Theodor Loevy and Paul Bermann. The publication of Danziger Echo was discontinued on July 18, 1936, as the government of the Free City issued a ten-month suspension of the paper.
