= Objazda, Opole Voivodeship =

Objazda
- Village
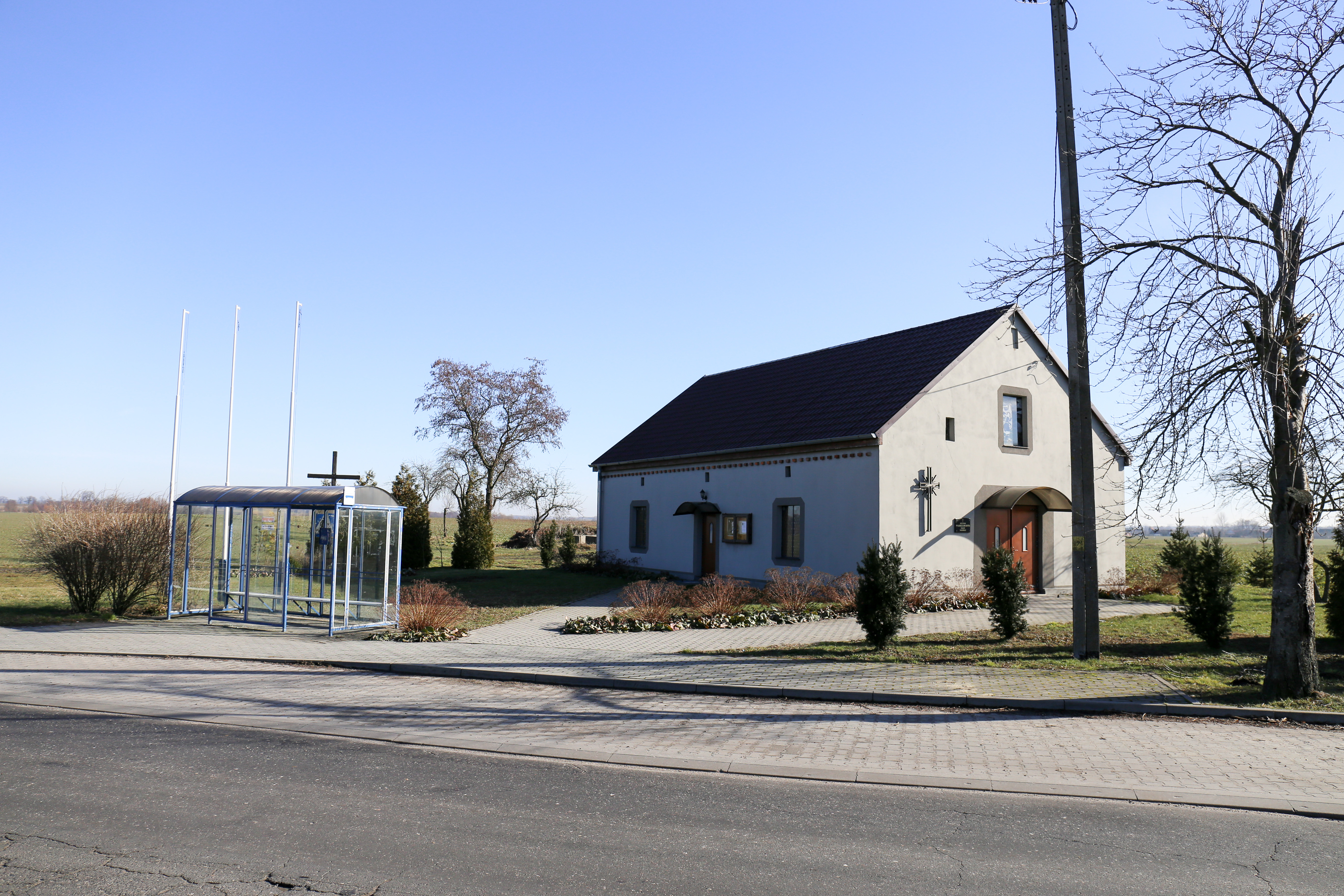

- Location within Poland
- Coordinates: 51°06′58″N 17°44′30″E
- Country: Poland
- Voivodeship: Opole
- County: Namysłów
- Gmina: Namysłów
- Time zone: UTC+1 (CET)
  - Summer (DST): UTC+2 (CEST)
- Vehicle registration: ONA

Objazda [ɔbˈjazda] (German: Obischau) is a village in the administrative district of Gmina Namysłów, within Namysłów County, Opole Voivodeship, in southern Poland.

The name of the village is of Polish origin and comes from the word objazd. It was mentioned in historic documents in 1288.
