= Hugo Neumann =

German jurist, politician and writer

Member of the Volkstag
- In office 1920–1927

Personal details
- Born: 5 August 1882 Berent, West Prussia
- Died: 4 September 1962 (aged 80) Paris, France
- Party: Freie Wirtschaftliche Vereinigung (1920-23); German Democratic Party (DDP) (1923-27)
- Occupation: Jurist

Hugo Neumann (8 May 1882 – 4 September 1962) was a German jurist, politician of the Free City of Danzig and writer.

== Biography ==
Neumann was born in Berent (modern Kościerzyna, Poland) to Max Neumann. He studied law at the Universities of Berlin, Königsberg and Heidelberg and received his doctorate in law in 1904.

Neumann worked as a lawyer and Notary in Danzig (Gdańsk) and became a member of the Danzig parliament in 1920.

As a member of the Jewish Community of Danzig he emigrated to France in 1938 because of the growing influence of Nazis in Danzig. After World War II, from 1945 to 1948, he worked as a legal advisor for the French delegation at the Allied Control Council in Berlin.

From 1956 to 1962 he was the chairman of the board of directors of the Swiss "Internationale Treuhandgruppe" (ITAG).

Neumann published several books using the pseudonym "Felix Norbert". He died in Paris.

== Publications ==
- Die öffentlich-rechtliche Stellung der Ärzte, Heidelberg 1904. (Dissertation; as Hugo Neumann)
- Schicksal und Anteil. 3 Erzählungen, Berlin 1948 (as Felix Norbert)
- Finale. Blätter aus einem Danziger Tagebuch, Berlin s.a. 1948 (as Felix Norbert)
- Barbara, Berlin 1948 (as Hugo Neumann )
- Von der Weichsel zur Seine, 1951 (biography)
