= Motława =

River in Poland

Motława River
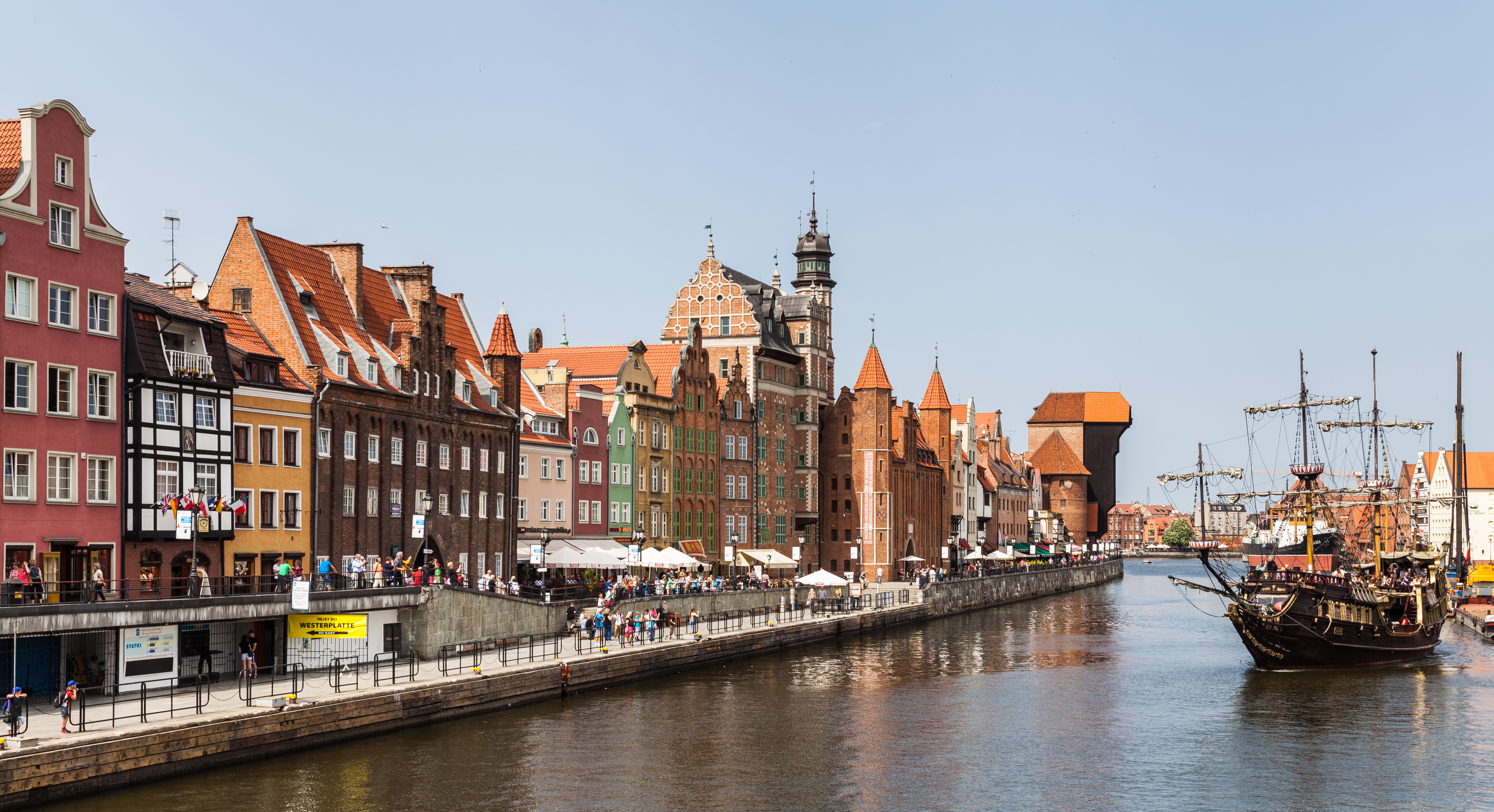
- The Main Town of Gdańsk

Location
- Country: Poland

Physical characteristics
- Source: Szpęgawskie Lake
  - location: near Szpęgawsk, Starogard County
- Mouth: Martwa Wisła
  - location: Gdańsk
  - coordinates: 54°21′36″N 18°39′51″E
- Length: 64.7 km (40.2 mi)
- Basin size: 1,511.3 km^{2} (583.5 mi^{2})

Basin features
- Progression: Martwa Wisła→ Baltic Sea
- Tributaries
  - left: Kłodawa; Radunia; Czarna Łacha
  - right: Nowa Motława
- Waterbodies: Rokickie Lake; Rokickie Małe Lake

The Motława (German: Mottlau; Kashubian: Mòtława) is a river in Eastern Pomerania in Poland. Its source is in Szpęgawskie Lake, northeast of the town of Starogard Gdański. The Motlawa goes through Rokickie Lake to Martwa Wisła, a branch of the Vistula. The total length of the river is estimated at 68 km, and its drainage basin is 1511.3 km^{2}.

The city of Gdańsk is situated at its mouth in the Martwa Wisła. In Gdańsk, the Motława ferry crosses the river, a service that has run since the year 1687.

The Polish name Motława is derived from Old Prussian language. In German the river is known as Mottlau.

A common theory for the etymology of the cities Gdańsk and Gdynia is that they are named after an older Polish and Kashubian name for the river, Gdania.

== Route ==
The Motława flows through the following municipalities: Starogard Gdański, Tczew, Suchy Dąb, Pruszcz Gdański, and the city of Gdańsk.
