= Regierungspräsident (Germany) =

In Germany, Regierungspräsident (German pronunciation: [ʁeˈɡiːʁʊŋspʁɛziˌdɛnt], district president, abbreviation RP) is the job title of the head of a federal state authority in the federal states of Baden-Württemberg, Bavaria, Hesse, and North Rhine-Westphalia. The jurisdiction of the authority defines a certain administrative division (Regierungsbezirk). The office holders are political civil servants, meaning they can be removed from their office by the government without reasons, and are appointed by the Minister President of the respective federal state.

== History ==
The authority governed by the district president was introduced in Prussia in 1808 under the Prussian Reform Movement. It substituted the war and domain chambers incumbent in Prussia since 1723. On April 30, 1815 the „Verordnung wegen verbesserter Einrichtung der Provinzialbehörden“ (edict for improved installment of provincial authorities) divided the Prussian state territory into ten provinces, which in turn were divided into two or more regierungsbezirke, 28 in total. Up to the dispersal of the Prussian state in 1947 the simplification of the medium level administration was an ongoing issue since the allocation of responsibilities to the Oberpräsident and the district president was not precise. The Province of Hohenzollern was the only Prussian province where the district president had the same legal power as the Oberpräsident.

During the time of the German Reich especially the larger federal states had district presidents as administrative middle level authorities. Sometimes the designation of the allocated regional entity was a different one: In Bavaria and Württemberg they were called Kreise (districts), Provionzen (provinces) in Hesse, Landeskommissärbezirk in Baden and Kreishauptmannschaften in Saxony. In Nazi Germany the official title of the head of the authority was unified to Regierungspräsident, following the Prussian denomination.

After 1945, administrative districts were established in the bigger federal states in West Germany (not in Schleswig-Holstein and the Saarland) for the middle authorities of the national administration. In the Soviet zone there was only one regierungsbezirk in Saxony-Anhalt. The districts were headed by the district president. In the 1980s the label for the authority was changed from "Regierungspräsident" (district president) to "Regierungspräsidium" (German: [ʁeˈɡiːʁʊŋspʁɛˌziːdi̯ʊm], district headquarters).
