= List of towns in Farther Pomerania =

< List of placenames in the Province of Pomerania < List of towns in Farther Pomerania

The List of towns in Farther Pomerania includes towns that lost their town status over time as well as towns which lie west of the Oder river, but east of the Oder–Neisse line, and thus historically are associated rather with Hither Pomerania (Western Pomerania). The list also includes towns merged into the Province of Pomerania as late as 1938 and thus might not be regarded historically belonging to Farther Pomerania either.

Polish name	County	Voivodeship	German name	County 1910	Regierungs-bezirk 1910	County before 1945	Year granted town rights	Population 1910	Population 1939	Notes
Dąbie	-	West Pomeranian	Altdamm	Randow	Stettin	Stadtkreis Stettin	1260	7,283	16,207	merged to Stettin in 1939
Lipie	Świdwin	West Pomeranian	Arnhausen	Belgard	Köslin	Belgard	1287-16.Cty	191	848	
Choszczno	Choszczno	West Pomeranian	Arnswalde	Arnswalde	Frankfurt/Oder	Arnswalde	1291	9,455	14,000	1938 from Brandenburg
Połczyn Zdrój	Świdwin	West Pomeranian	Bad Polzin	Belgard	Köslin	Belgard	1335	5,160	6,900	
Banie	Gryfino	West Pomeranian	Bahn	Greifenhagen	Stettin	Greifenhagen	1234-1945	2,505	2,884	
Biały Bór	Szczecinek	West Pomeranian	Baldenburg	Schlochau	Marienwerder	Schlochau	1382	2,469	2,300	1938 from Posen-West Prussia; Historically part of Gdańsk Pomerania
Barwice	Szczecinek	West Pomeranian	Bärwalde	Neustettin	Köslin	Neustettin	1409	2,286	3,009	
Białogard	Białogard	West Pomeranian	Belgard	Belgard	Köslin	Belgard	1299	9,262	16,500	
Bobolice	Koszalin	West Pomeranian	Bublitz	Köslin	Köslin	Köslin	1340	5,175	6,100	
Bytów	Bytów	Pomeranian	Bütow	Bütow	Köslin	Bütow	1346	7,839	10,038	Historically also considered part of Gdańsk Pomerania
Dobra	Łobez	West Pomeranian	Daber	Naugard	Stettin	Naugard	before 1331	2,213	2,529	
Wałcz	Wałcz	West Pomeranian	Deutsch Krone	Deutsch Krone	Marienwerder	Deutsch Krone	1303	7,673	14,941	1938 from Posen-West Prussia; Historically part of Greater Poland
Drawsko Pomorskie	Drawsko Pomorskie	West Pomeranian	Dramburg	Dramburg	Köslin	Dramburg	1297	6,260	8,091	
Drezdenko	Strzelce Krajeńskie-Drezdenko	Lubusz	Driesen	Friedeberg	Frankfurt/Oder	Friedeberg	1317	6,003	5,674	1938 from Brandenburg
Złocieniec	Drawsko Pomorskie	West Pomeranian	Falkenburg	Dramburg	Köslin	Dramburg	1333	4,770	9,000	
Widuchowa	Gryfino	West Pomeranian	Fiddichow	Greifenhagen	Stettin	Greifenhagen	1347	2,682	2,496	
Złotów	Złotów	Greater Poland	Flatow	Flatow	Marienwerder	Flatow	before 1370	4,282	7,496	1938 from Posen-West Prussia; Historically part of Greater Poland
Chociwel	Stargard	West Pomeranian	Freienwalde	Saatzig	Stettin	Saatzig	1338	2,669	3,411	
Strzelce Krajenskie	Strzelce Krajeńskie-Drezdenko	Lubusz	Friedeberg	Friedeberg	Frankfurt/Oder	Friedeberg	before 1270	5,460	6,100	1938 from Brandenburg; Historically part of Greater Poland
Goleniów	Goleniów	West Pomeranian	Gollnow	Naugard	Stettin	Naugard	1268	10,259	13,700	
Grabowo	-	West Pomeranian	Grabow	Stadtkreis Stettin	Stettin	Stadtkreis Stettin	1853	1895: 15784		merged to Stettin in 1900
Gryfice	Gryfice	West Pomeranian	Greifenberg	Greifenberg	Stettin	Greifenberg	before 1262	7,769	10,805	
Gryfino	Gryfino	West Pomeranian	Greifenhagen	Stettin	Greifenhagen	1254	7,260	9,855		
Golczewo	Kamień Pomorski	West Pomeranian	Gülzow	Kammin	Stettin	Kammin	-1855 ab 1990	1,479	1,930	
Czarne	Człuchów	Pomeranian	Hammerstein	Schlochau	Marienwerder	Schlochau	1395	3,015	4,387	1938 from Posen-West Prussia; Historically part of Gdańsk Pomerania
Stare Osieczno	Strzelce Krajeńskie-Drezdenko	Lubusz	Hochzeit	Arnswalde	Frankfurt/Oder	Arnswalde	1350	527	445	1938 from Brandenburg
Dobrzany	Stargard	West Pomeranian	Jacobshagen	Saatzig	Stettin	Saatzig	before 1336	1,855	1,986	
Jastrowie	Złotów	Greater Poland	Jastrow	Deutsch Krone	Marienwerder	Deutsch Krone	before 1602	5,514	5,895	1938 from Posen-West Prussia; Historically part of Greater Poland
Kalisz Pomorski	Drawsko Pomorskie	West Pomeranian	Kallies	Dramburg	Köslin	Dramburg	1303	3,373	4,019	
Kamień Pomorski	Kamień Pomorski	West Pomeranian	Kammin	Kammin	Stettin	Kammin	1274	5,883	6,070	
Kołobrzeg	Kołobrzeg	West Pomeranian	Kolberg	Kolberg-Körlin	Köslin	Stadtkreis	1255	24,786	36,760	
Karlino	Białogard	West Pomeranian	Körlin	Kolberg-Körlin	Köslin	Kolberg-Körlin	1299	2,998	3,429	
Koszalin	kreisfrei	West Pomeranian	Köslin	Köslin	Köslin	Stadtkreis	1266	23,236	33,500	
Krzyż Wielkopolski	Czarnków	Greater Poland	Kreuz	Czarnikau	Bromberg	Netzekreis	1936		4,956	1938 from Posen-West Prussia; Historically part of Greater Poland
Krajenka	Złotów	Greater Poland	Krojanke	Flatow	Marienwerder	Flatow	1420	3,428	3,233	1938 from Posen-West Prussia; Historically part of Greater Poland
Korytowo	Choszczno	West Pomeranian	Kürtow	Arnswalde	Frankfurt/Oder	Arnswalde	1486-?	289	759	1938 from Brandenburg
Łobez	Łobez	West Pomeranian	Labes	Regenwalde	Stettin	Regenwalde	1295	5,179	7,300	
Lędyczek	Złotów	Greater Poland	Landeck	Schlochau	Marienwerder	Schlochau	1775-1972	767	1,010	1938 from Posen-West Prussia; Historically part of Gdańsk Pomerania
Lębork	Lębork	Pomeranian	Lauenburg	Lauenburg	Köslin	Lauenburg	1341	13,916	19,801	Historically also considered part of Gdańsk Pomerania
Łeba	Lębork	Pomeranian	Leba	Lauenburg	Köslin	Lauenburg	1357	1,972	2,849	Historically also considered part of Gdańsk Pomerania
Mirosławiec	Wałcz	West Pomeranian	Märkisch Friedland	Deutsch Krone	Marienwerder	Deutsch Krone	1314	1,929	2,707	1938 from Posen-West Prussia; Historically part of Greater Poland
Maszewo	Goleniów	West Pomeranian	Massow	Naugard	Stettin	Naugard	1278	2,880	3,830	
Nowogard	Goleniów	West Pomeranian	Naugard	Naugard	Stettin	Naugard	1274	5,087	8,202	
Szczecinek	Szczecinek	West Pomeranian	Neustettin	Neustettin	Köslin	Neustettin	1310	11,883	19,900	
Nowe Warpno	Police	West Pomeranian	Neuwarp	Ueckermünde	Stettin	Ückermünde	1352	1,939	2,055	between Oder and Oder-Neisse line
Drawno	Choszczno	West Pomeranian	Neuwedell	Arnswalde	Frankfurt/Oder	Arnswalde	1363	2,586	2,711	1938 from Brandenburg
Ińsko	Stargard	West Pomeranian	Nörenberg	Saatzig	Stettin	Saatzig	1300	2,605	3,012	
Płoty	Gryfice	West Pomeranian	Plathe	Regenwalde	Stettin	Regenwalde	1277	2,849	3,653	
Police	Police	West Pomeranian	Pölitz	Randow	Stettin	Stadtkreis Stettin	1260	4,149	6,466	merged to Stettin 1939–1945; between Oder and Oder-Neisse line
Polanów	Koszalin	West Pomeranian	Pollnow	Schlawe	Köslin	Schlawe	1313	2,750	3,631	
Debrzno	Człuchów	Pomeranian	Preußisch Friedland	Schlochau	Marienwerder	Schlochau	1354	3,865	3,843	1938 from Posen-West Prussia; Historically part of Gdańsk Pomerania
Pyrzyce	Pyrzyce	West Pomeranian	Pyritz	Pyritz	Stettin	Pyritz	1263	8,676	10,800	
Radolin	Czarnków	Greater Poland	Radolin	Czarnikau	Bromberg	Netzekreis	1764-1857	595	554	1938 from Posen-West Prussia
Okonek	Złotów	Greater Poland	Ratzebuhr	Neustettin	Köslin	Neustettin	1754	2,375	2,941	
Recz	Choszczno	West Pomeranian	Reetz	Arnswalde	Frankfurt/Oder	Arnswalde	1296	2,939	3,646	1938 from Brandenburg
Resko	Łobez	West Pomeranian	Regenwalde	Regenwalde	Stettin	Regenwalde	1255	3,558	5,014	
Darłowo	Sławno	West Pomeranian	Rügenwalde	Schlawe	Köslin	Schlawe	1271	5,978	8,392	
Miastko	Bytów	Pomeranian	Rummelsburg	Rummelsburg	Köslin	Rummelsburg	1617	5,934	5,500	
Świdwin	Świdwin	West Pomeranian	Schivelbein	Schivelbein	Köslin	Belgard	1296	7,715	9,200	
Sławno	Sławno	West Pomeranian	Schlawe	Schlawe	Köslin	Schlawe	1317	6,620	9,746	
Człuchów	Człuchów	Pomeranian	Schlochau	Schlochau	Marienwerder	Schlochau	1348	3,616	6,029	1938 from Posen-West Prussia; Historically part of Gdańsk Pomerania
Człopa	Wałcz	West Pomeranian	Schloppe	Deutsch Krone	Marienwerder	Deutsch Krone	before 1350	1,957	3,000	1938 from Posen-West Prussia; Historically part of Greater Poland
Piła	Piła	Greater Poland	Schneidemühl	Kolmar in Posen	Bromberg	Stadtkreis	1380	26,126	45,791	1938 from Posen-West Prussia; Historically part of Greater Poland
Trzcianka	Czarnków	Greater Poland	Schönlanke	Czarnikau	Bromberg	Netzekreis	1731	7,849	9,429	1938 from Posen-West Prussia; Historically part of Greater Poland
Stargard	Stargard	West Pomeranian	Stargard	Saatzig	Stettin	Stadtkreis	1253	27,551	39,760	own county since 1901
Stepnica	Goleniów	West Pomeranian	Stepenitz	Kammin	Stettin	Kammin	1721-1774	1570	2,871	
Szczecin	city-county	West Pomeranian	Stettin	Stadtkreis	Stettin	Stadtkreis	1243	236,113	384,000	between Oder and Oder-Neisse line
Słupsk	city-county	Pomeranian	Stolp	Stadtkreis	Köslin	Stadtkreis	1310	33,762	45,600	
Strzmiele	Łobez	West Pomeranian	Stramehl	Regenwalde	Stettin	Regenwalde	1348-18 Cty	413	406	
Świnoujście	city-county	West Pomeranian	Swinemünde	Usedom-Wollin	Stettin	Stadtkreis	1765	13,914	20,000	between Oder and Oder-Neisse line
Danków	Strzelce Krajeńskie-Drezdenko	Lubusz	Tankow	Friedeberg	Frankfurt/Oder	Friedeberg	1347-1608	96	240	1938 from Brandenburg
Czaplinek	Drawsko Pomorskie	West Pomeranian	Tempelburg	Neustettin	Köslin	Neustettin	before 1334	4,506	5,275	Historically part of Greater Poland
Trzebiatów	Gryfice	West Pomeranian	Treptow/Rega	Greifenberg	Stettin	Greifenberg	1277	8,495	10,908	
Tuczno	Wałcz	West Pomeranian	Tütz	Deutsch Krone	Marienwerder	Deutsch Krone	before 1306	2,096	2,747	1938 from Posen-West Prussia; Historically part of Greater Poland
Węgorzyno	Łobez	West Pomeranian	Wangerin	Regenwalde	Stettin	Regenwalde	before 1460	2,747	3,454	
Wierzbno	Pyrzycki	West Pomeranian	Werben	Pyritz	Stettin	Pyritz	1316- Ende 16.Cty	588	585	
Dobiegniew	Strzelce Krajeńskie-Drezdenko	Lubusz	Woldenberg	Friedeberg	Frankfurt/Oder	Friedeberg	1313	4,608	5,674	1938 from Brandenburg; Historically part of Greater Poland
Wolin	Kamień Pomorski	West Pomeranian	Wollin	Usedom-Wollin	Stettin	Usedom-Wollin	before 1279	4,537	4,807	between Oder and Oder-Neisse line
Suchań	Stargard	West Pomeranian	Zachan	Saatzig	Stettin	Saatzig	1487	1,343	1,302	
Sianów	Koszalin	West Pomeranian	Zanow	Schlawe	Köslin	Schlawe	1343	2,573	3,055	

== See also ==
- List of towns in Vorpommern

== Literature ==
- Fritz R. Barran: Städte-Atlas Pommern. 2. Auflage. Rautenberg, Würzburg 2005, ISBN 3-8003-3097-0.
- Peter Johanek, Franz-Joseph Post (Hrsg.): Städtebuch Hinterpommern. Verlag Kohlhammer, Stuttgart 2003.
