= Province of Pomerania (1815–1945) =

Province of Prussia (1815–1945)

Province of Pomerania Provinz Pommern (German)
- Province of Prussia
- 1815–1945
- Flag Coat of arms

- The Province of Pomerania (red) within the Kingdom of Prussia (blue) in 1914
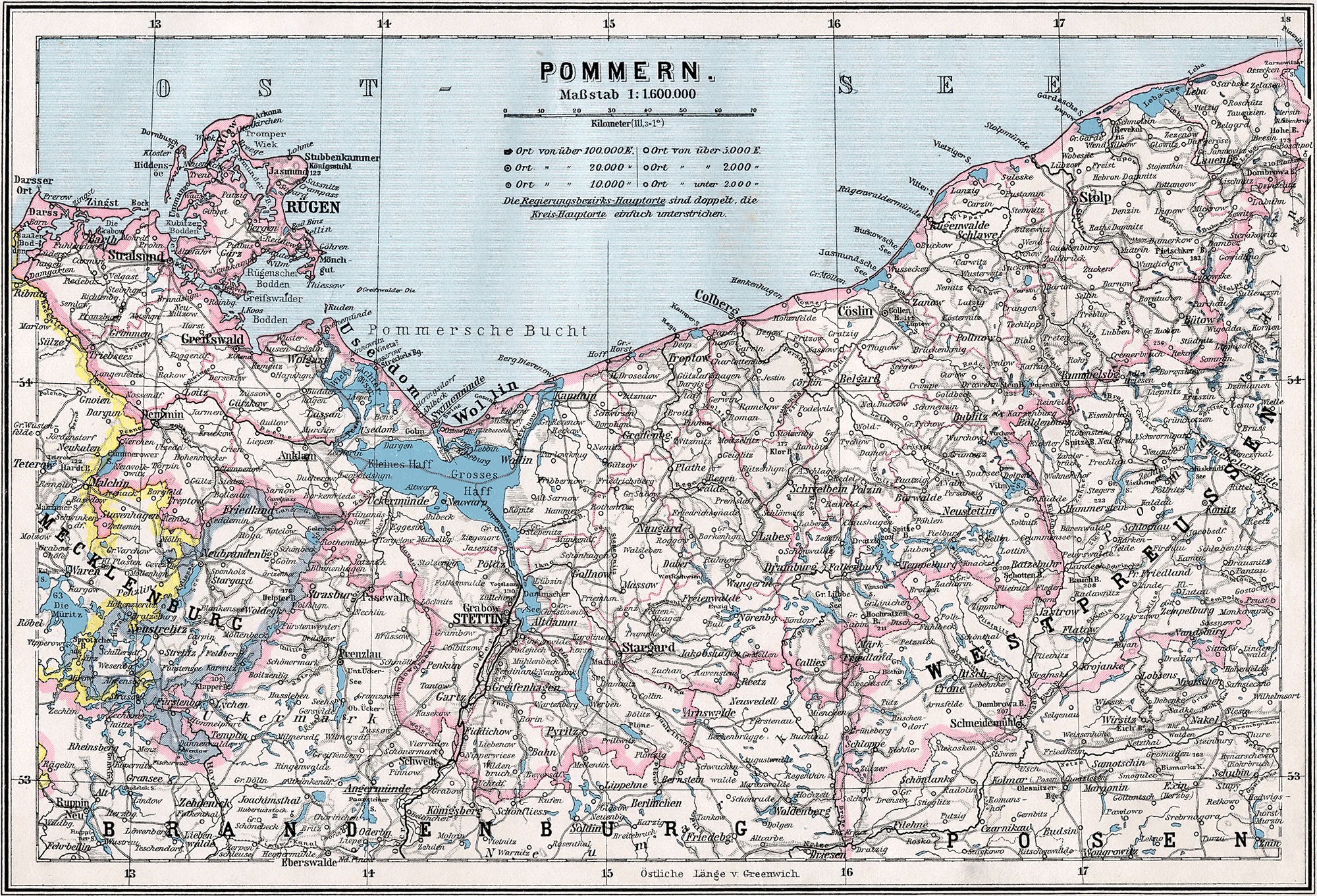
- Capital: Stettin (Szczecin)
- Area
  - Coordinates: 53°25′52″N 14°33′57″E
  - 1905: 30,120 km^{2} (11,630 sq mi)
  - 1939: 38,400 km^{2} (14,800 sq mi)
- Population
  - 1905: 1,684,125
- History
  - Established: 1815
  - Disestablished: 1945
- Political subdivisions: Köslin; Stettin; Stralsund (1818−1932); Posen-West Prussia (1938−1945)
Preceded by	Succeeded by
Swedish Pomerania; Province of Pomerania	State of Mecklenburg; District of Western Pomerania
- Today part of: Germany: ∟Brandenburg; ∟Mecklenburg-Vorpommern; Poland: ∟Pomerania; ∟West Pomerania; ∟Lubusz; ∟Greater Poland

The Province of Pomerania (German: Provinz Pommern; Polish: Prowincja Pomorze) was a province of Prussia from 1815 to 1945. Pomerania was established as a province of the Kingdom of Prussia in 1815, an expansion of the older Brandenburg-Prussia province of Pomerania, and then became part of the German Empire in 1871. From 1918, Pomerania was a province of the Free State of Prussia until it was dissolved following World War II by decree of the Allied Control Council with the de jure abolition of Prussia on 25 February 1947, and its territory divided between Poland and Allied-occupied Germany. The city of Stettin (present-day Szczecin, Poland) was the provincial capital.

== Overview ==
=== Etymology ===
The name Pomerania comes from Slavic po more, which means "Land at the Sea".

=== Geography ===
Physical map of the Province of Pomerania in 1905

The Province of Pomerania encompassed lands to the east and west of the mouth of the Oder River along the coast of the Baltic Sea. The province possessed a humid continental climate, with oceanic influences nearer to the sea.

To the west, the region of Hither Pomerania (German: Vorpommern) was bounded on its west by the Recknitz River. Here, the province bordered the Grand Duchy of Mecklenburg-Schwerin, the Duchy of Mecklenburg-Strelitz, and the Province of Brandenburg. The island of Rügen lays just off the heavily-indented coastline, featuring numerous inlets of the sea and chalk cliffs. Hither Pomerania was drained by many small rivers, the largest of which were the Peene and Uecker. The regional capital of Stralsund, as well as the towns of Greifswald, Anklam, and Demmin, were the most prominent political, cultural, and economic centers of this region.

In the center, the Oder River emptied into the Stettin Lagoon, and from there reached the Baltic Sea through the Peenestrom, Swine, and Dievenow channels. The islands of Usedom and Wollin separated the lagoon from the sea. Upriver, the Unteres Odertal was a low-lying, marshy network of waterways as the Oder neared its estuary. Aside from the Oder, the main rivers of this region were the Ihna and Plöne. Stettin (Polish: Szczecin), the provincial capital, was found at the mouth of the Oder. Other major cities in this area included Stargard in Pommern and Swinemünde (Polish: Świnoujście).

To the east, the region of Farther Pomerania (German: Hinterpommern) reached over 250 kilometers to the northeast. Here the province shared borders with the Prussian provinces of Posen and West Prussia. The long, graded shoreline featured numerous sandy beaches, as well as large lagoons, among which were the Lebasee and Gardersee. The Slovincian Coast stretched along these lagoons in the easternmost parts of the province. Inland, Farther Pomerania was heavily forested and included a portion of the Baltic Uplands. The largest rivers of this region, most of which flowed northward towards the Baltic Sea, included the Rega, Persante, Wipper, Stolpe, and Leba. The capital of this region was Köslin (Polish: Koszalin); other major cities included Kolberg (Polish: Kołobrzeg) and Stolp (Polish: Słupsk).

=== History ===
The province was created from the former Prussian Province of Pomerania, which consisted of Farther Pomerania and the southern Western Pomerania, and former Swedish Pomerania. It resembled the territory of the former Duchy of Pomerania, which after the Peace of Westphalia in 1648 had been split between Brandenburg-Prussia and Sweden. Also, the districts of Schivelbein (Świdwin) and Dramburg (Drawsko Pomorskie), formerly belonging to the Neumark, were merged into the new province.

While in the Kingdom of Prussia, the province was heavily influenced by the reforms of Karl August von Hardenberg and Otto von Bismarck. The Industrial Revolution primarily affected the Stettin area and the infrastructure, while most of the province retained a rural and agricultural character. From 1850, the net migration rate was negative; Pomeranians emigrated primarily to Berlin, the West German industrial regions and overseas.

After World War I, democracy and the women's right to vote were introduced to the province. After Wilhelm II's abdication, it was part of the Free State of Prussia. The economic situation worsened due to the consequences of World War I and worldwide recession. As in the previous Kingdom of Prussia, Pomerania was a stronghold of the national conservatives who continued in the Weimar Republic.

In 1933, the Nazis established a totalitarian regime, concentrating the province's administration in the hands of their Gauleiter, and implementing Gleichschaltung. The German invasion of Poland in 1939 was launched in part from Pomeranian soil. Jewish and Polish populations (whose minorities lived in the region) were classified as "subhuman" by the German state during the war and subjected to repressions, slave work and executions. Opponents were arrested and executed; Jews who by 1940 had not emigrated were all deported to the Lublin reservation. Besides the air raids conducted since 1943, World War II reached the province in early 1945 with the East Pomeranian Offensive and the Battle of Berlin, both launched and won by the Soviet Union's Red Army. Insufficient evacuation left the population subject to murder, war rape, and plunder by the successors.

When the war was over, the Oder–Neisse line cut the province in two unequal parts. The smaller western part became part of the East German State of Mecklenburg-Vorpommern. The larger eastern part was attached to post-war Poland as Szczecin Voivodeship. After the war, ethnic Germans were expelled from Poland in accordance with the Potsdam Agreement and the area was re-settled with Poles. Currently, most of the territory of the province lies within the West Pomeranian Voivodeship, which share the same city—now Szczecin—as its capital.

Until 1932, the province was subdivided into the government regions (Regierungsbezirk Köslin (eastern part, Farther Pomerania), Stettin (southwestern part, Old Western Pomerania), and Stralsund (northwestern part, Neuvorpommern). The Stralsund region was merged into the Stettin region in 1932. In 1938, the Grenzmark Posen-West Prussia region (southeastern part, created from the former Prussian Province Posen-West Prussia) was merged into the province. The provincial capital was Stettin (now Szczecin), the Regierungsbezirk capitals were Köslin (now Koszalin), Stettin, Stralsund and Schneidemühl (now Piła), respectively.

In 1905 the province of Pomerania had 1,684,326 inhabitants, among them 1,616,550 Protestants, 50,206 Catholics, and 9,660 Jews. In 1900 Polish was the native language of 14,162 of the inhabitants (at the border to West Prussia), and there were 310 (at the Lake Leba and at the Lake Garde) whose native language was Kashubian. The area of the province amounted to 30,120 km^{2} (11,630 sq mi). In 1925, the province had an area of 30,208 km^{2} (11,663 sq mi), with a population of 1,878,780 inhabitants.

== Creation and administration of the province within the Kingdom of Prussia ==
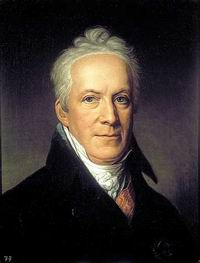
Karl August von Hardenberg

Although there had been a Prussian Province of Pomerania before, the province of Pomerania was newly constituted in 1815, based on the "decree concerning improved establishment of provincial offices" (German: Verordnung wegen verbesserter Einrichtung der Provinzialbehörden), issued by Karl August von Hardenberg on 30 April, and the integration of Swedish Pomerania, handed over to Prussia on 23 October.

The Hardenberg decree reformed all Prussian territories, which henceforth formed ten (later eight) provinces with similar administrations. After the implementation of the reform, the new province of Pomerania consisted basically of its predecessor and Swedish Pomerania, but also of the Dramburg and Schivelbein counties.

The province was headed by a governor (Oberpräsident, literally "senior president") with his seat in the capital, Stettin. It was subdivided into government regions (Regierungsbezirke) headed by a president (Regierungspräsident). Initially, two such regions were planned (Regierungsbezirk Stettin, comprising Western Pomerania, and Regierungsbezirk Köslin, comprising Farther Pomerania). Hardenberg however, who as the Prussian chief diplomat had settled the terms of session of Swedish Pomerania with Sweden at the Congress of Vienna, had assured to leave the local constitution in place when the treaty was signed on 7 June 1815. This circumstance led to a creation of a third government region, Regierungsbezirk Stralsund, for the former Swedish Pomerania at the expense of the Stettin region.

In early 1818, Governor Johann August Sack had reformed the county (Kreise) shapes, yet adopted the former shape in most cases. Köslin government region comprised nine counties, Stettin government region thirteen, and Stralsund government region four (identical with the former Swedish Ämter (districts)).

The new parliament (Landtag) assembled first on October 3, 1824. Based on two laws of June 5 and July, 1823, the Landtag was constituted by 25 lords and knights, 16 representatives of the towns, and eight from the rural communities.

Subordinate to the provincial Landtag were two Kommunallandtag assemblies, one for former Swedish Pomerania (Western Pomerania north of the Peene River) and one for the former Prussian part.

The counties each assembled a Kreisstand, where the knights of the county had one vote each and towns also just one vote.

Throughout its existence, the province was a stronghold of the Conservative Parties.

=== Infrastructure ===
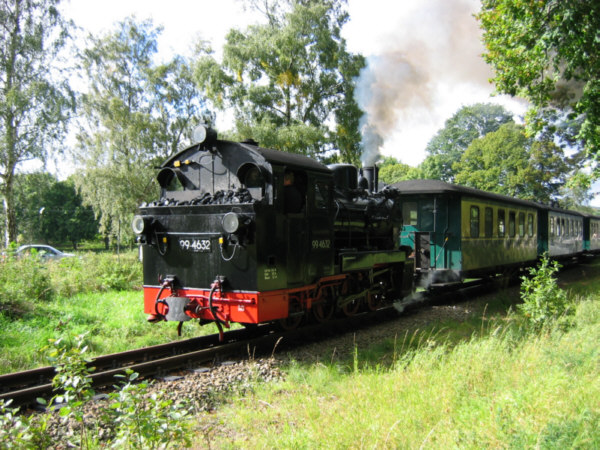
Narrow gauge railway "Rügensche Kleinbahn", operating since 1895

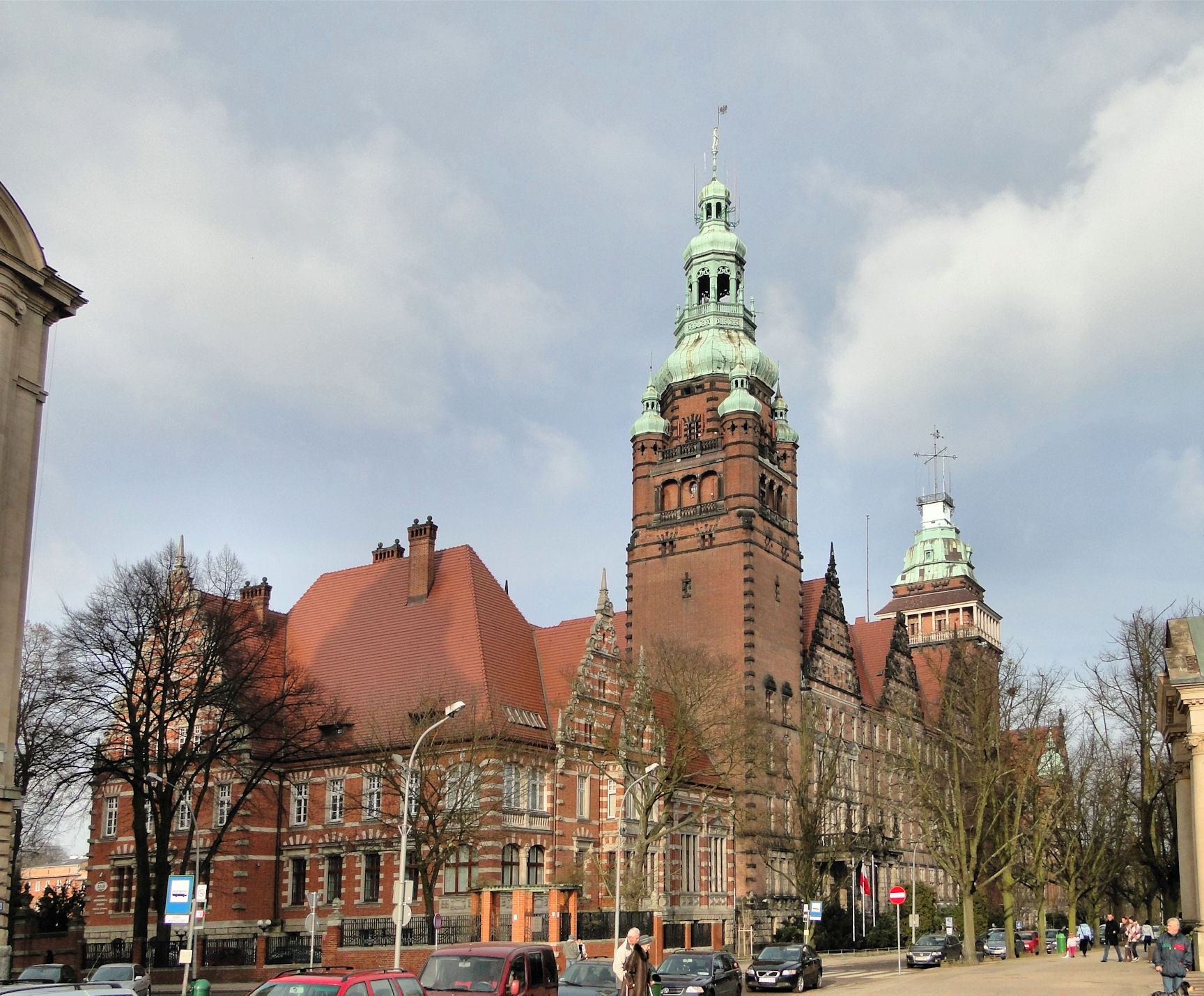
The seat of government, now the West Pomeranian Voivodeship Office Building

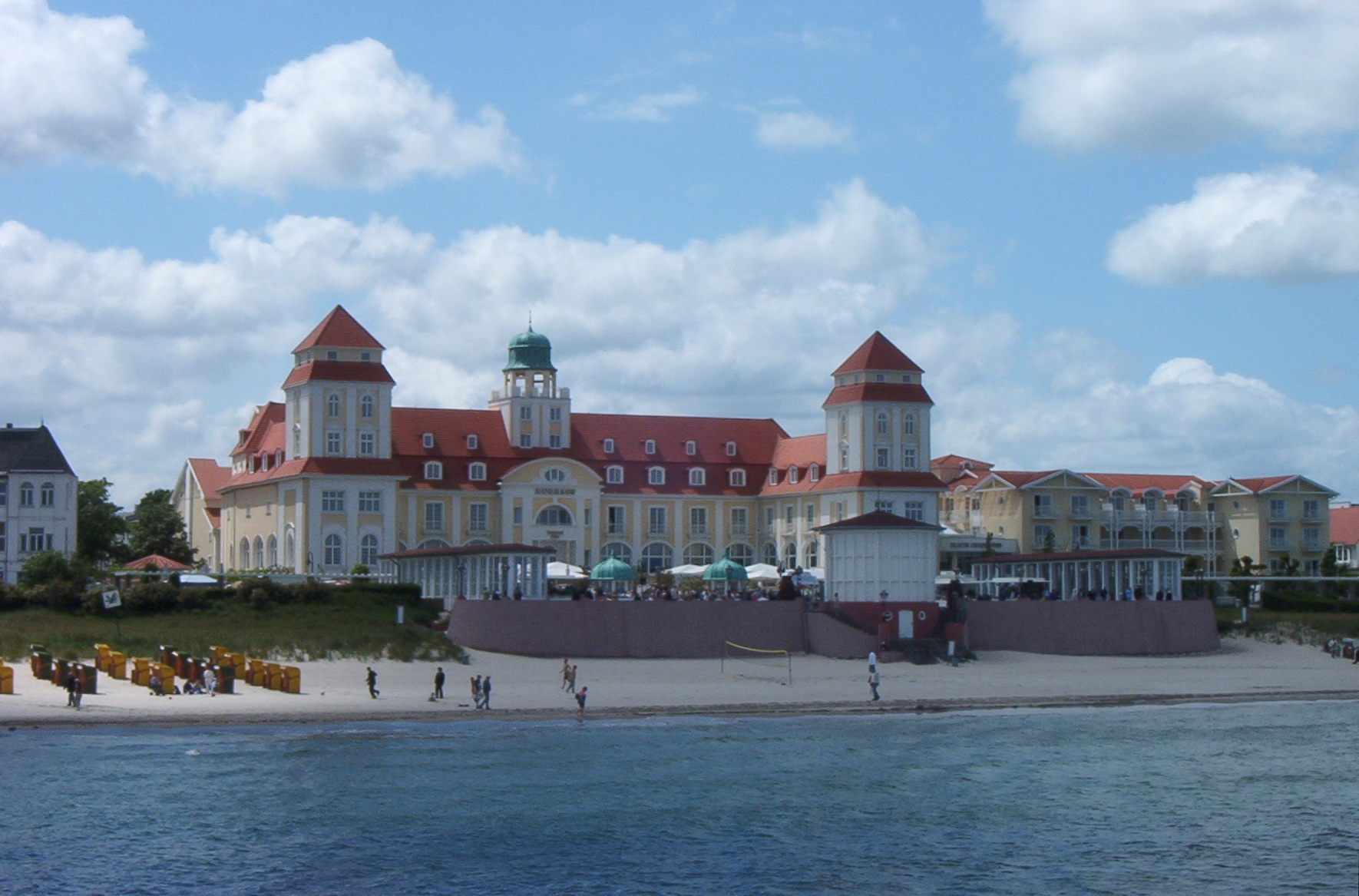
Binz, tourist resort since the 1860s

In the 19th century, the first overland routes (Chaussee) and railways were introduced in Pomerania. In 1848, 126.8 Prussian miles of new streets had been built. On October 12, 1840, construction of the Berlin-Stettin railway began, which was finished on 15 August 1843. Other railways followed: Stettin–Köslin (1859), Angermünde–Stralsund and Züssow–Wolgast (1863), Stettin–Stolp (1869), and a connection with Danzig (1870).

In rural areas, many narrow-gauge railways were built for faster transport of crops. The first gas, water, and power plants were built. Streets and canalisation of the towns were modernized.

The construction of narrow-gauge railways was enhanced by a special decree of July 28, 1892, implementing Prussian financial aid programs. In 1900, the total of narrow-gauge railways had passed the 1,000-kilometer (620 mi) threshold.

From 1910 to 1912, most of the province was supplied with electricity as the main lines were built. Plants were built since 1898.

The Świna and lower Oder rivers, the major water route to Stettin, were deepened to five meters and shortened by a canal in 1862. In Stettin, heavy industry was settled, making it the only industrial center of the province.

Stettin was connected to Berlin by the Berlin-Stettin waterway in 1914 after eight years of construction. The other traditional waterways and ports of the province, however, declined. Exceptions were only the port of Swinemünde (Świnoujście), which was used by the navy, and the port of Stolpmünde (Ustka), from which parts of the Farther Pomeranian exports were shipped, and the port of Sassnitz, which was built in 1895 for railway ferries to Scandinavia.

With the infrastructural improvements, mass tourism to the Baltic Coast started. The tourist resort (Ostseebad) Binz had 80 visitors in 1870, 10,000 in 1900, and 22,000 in 1910. The same phenomenon occurred in other tourist resorts.

=== Agricultural reform ===
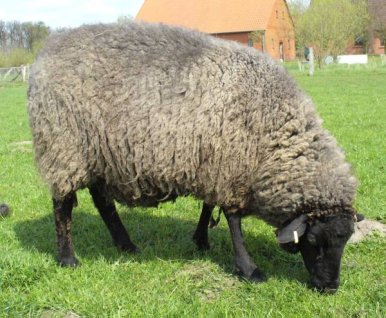
Pomeranian Coarsewool Sheep. Pomerania was the leading Prussian province in sheep breeding.

Already in 1807, Prussia issued a decree (Steinsches Oktoberedikt) abolishing serfdom. Hardenberg issued a decree on September 14, 1811, defining the terms by which serfs were to be released (Hardenbergsches Regulierungsedikt). This could either be done by monetary payment or by releasing title to the land to the former lord. These reforms were applied during the early years of the province's existence. The so-called "regulation" was applied to 10,744 peasants until 1838, who paid their former lords 724,954 taler and handed over 255,952 hectares (2,559.52 km^{2}; 988.24 sq mi) of farmland to bail themselves out.

Tumults arose in 1847 in the towns of Stettin and Köslin due to food shortages, as a result, prices for some foods were fixed.

On March 2, 1850, a law was passed settling the conditions on which peasants and farmers could capitalize their property rights and feudal service duties, and thus get a long-term credit (41 to 56 years to pay back). This law made way for the establishment of Rentenbank credit houses and Rentengut farms. Subsequently, the previous rural structure changed dramatically as farmers, who used this credit to bail out their feudal duties, were now able to self determine how to use their land (so-called "regulated" peasants and farmers, regulierte Bauern). This was not possible before, when the jurisdiction had sanctioned the use of farmland and feudal services according not to property rights, but to social status within rural communities and estates.

From 1891 to 1910, 4,731 Rentengut farms were set up, most (2,690) with a size of 10 to 25 hectares (0.10 to 0.25 km^{2}; 0.039 to 0.097 sq mi).

=== Bismarck era administrative reforms ===
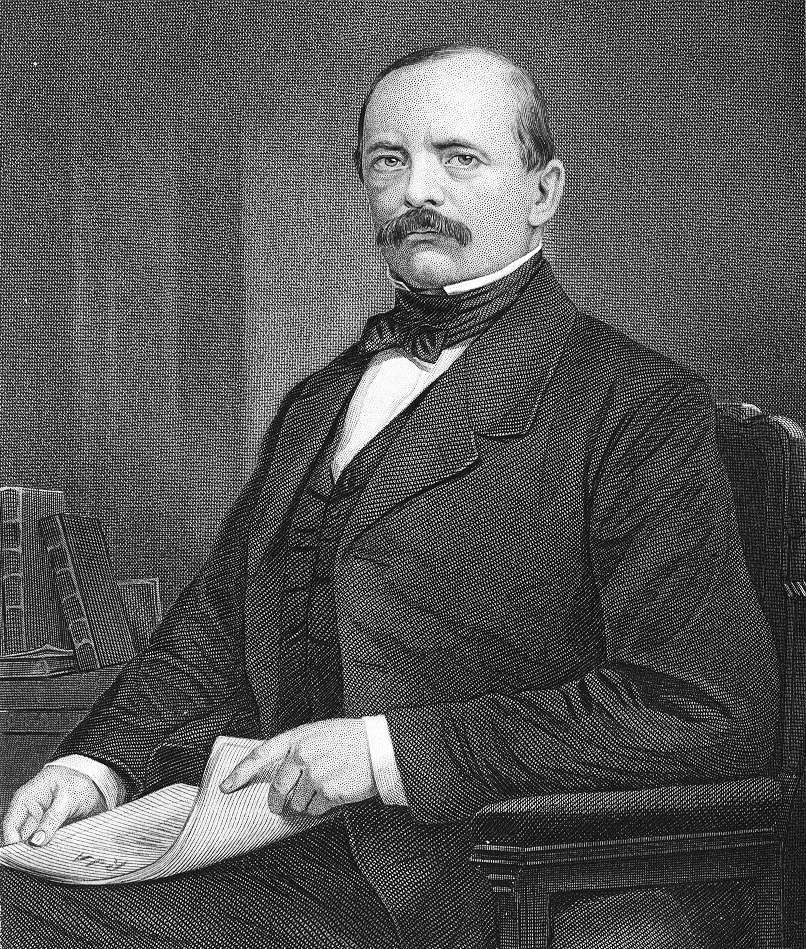
Otto von Bismarck in 1873

Otto von Bismarck inherited from his father the Farther Pomeranian estates Külz (Kulice), Jarchlin (Jarchlino) and Kniephof (Konarzewo). Aiming at a farming career, he studied agriculture at the academy in Greifswald-Eldena. From 1867 to 1874, he bought and expanded the Varzin (Warcino) estates.

In 1869, Friedrich Albrecht Graf zu Eulenburg drafted a county reform (Kreisreform) that was promoted by Bismarck. The reform passed the House of Lords on December 7, 1872. Most importantly, the reform cut the linkage between noble status and the right to vote, the latter now depended on property (one had to be above a certain tax threshold) and not on status, aiming against the overrepresentation of the knights compared to burghers.

On June 29, 1875, a new constitution for the province was passed (Provinzialordnung), which entered into force in 1876. It redefined the responsibilities of the provincial administration (headed by the Oberpräsident) and the self-administrative institutions (Provinzialverband, comprising the provincial parliament (Provinziallandtag), a Landeshauptmann (head) and a Landesausschuß (commission)). The Provinzialverband was financed directly from the Prussian state budget. The Landtag was responsible for streets, welfare, education, and culture. Landownership was no longer a criterion to become elected. The provincial Landtag (Provinziallandtag) was elected by the county representative assemblies (Kreistag for counties, Stadtverordnetenversammlung for town districts) for a six years' term. A subordinate Kommunallandtag only existed for Regierungsbezirk Stralsund, until it was abolished in 1881.

In 1891, a county reform was passed, allowing more communal self-government. Municipalities hence elected a Gemeindevorstand (head) and a Gemeindevertretung (communal parliament). Gutsbezirk districts, i.e. estates not included in counties, could be merged or dissolved.

== World War I ==
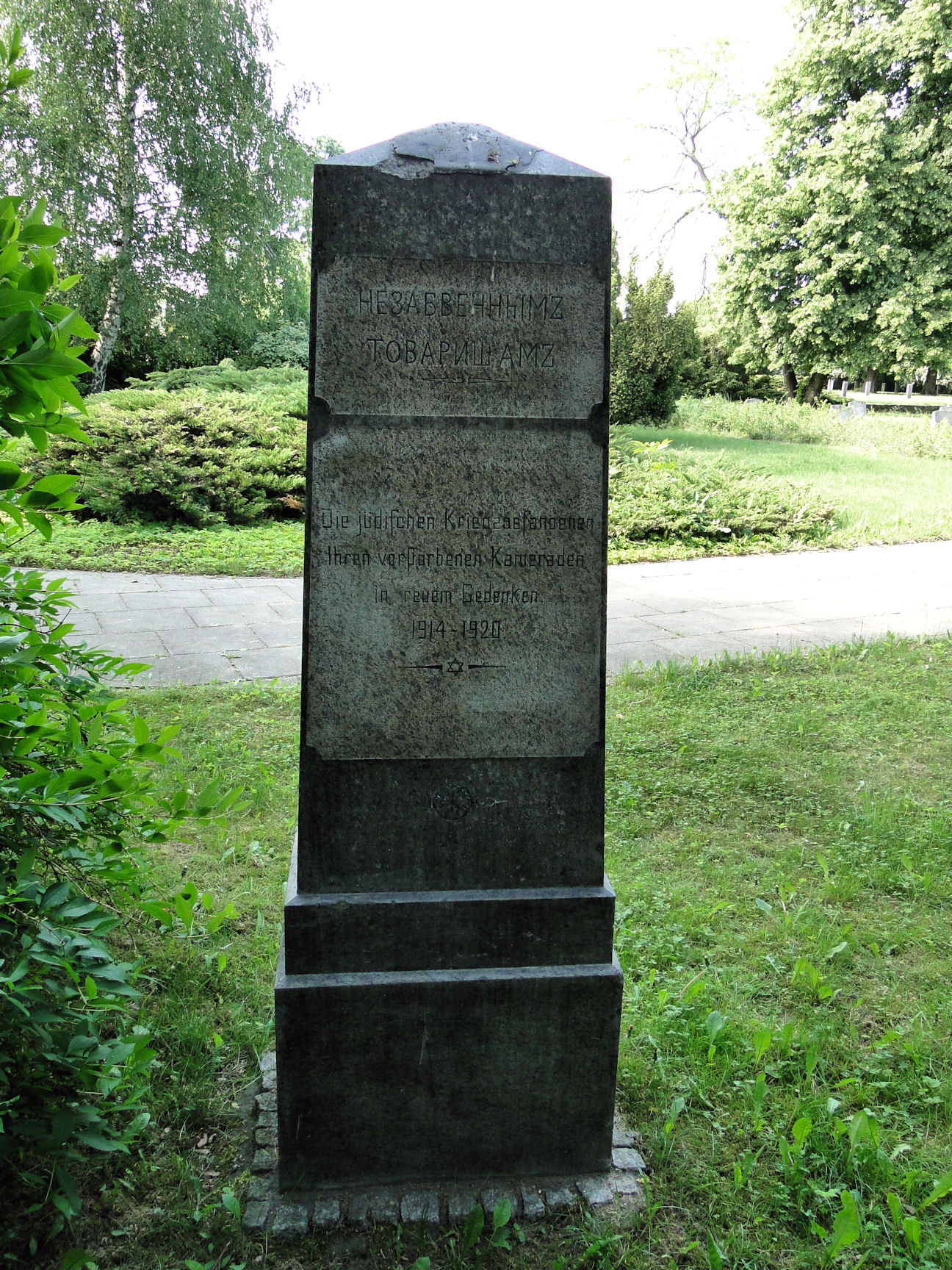
Memorial at the War Cemetery in Stargard

During the First World War, no battles took place in the province.

Nevertheless, the war affected society, economy, and administration. During the war, the provincial administrative institutions were subordinate to the military and headed by military officials. Mobilization resulted in work force shortage affecting all non-war-related industry, construction, and agriculture. Women, minors and POWs partially replaced the drafted men. Import and fishing declined when the ports were blocked. With the war going on, food shortages occurred, especially in the winter of 1916/17. Also coal, gas, and electricity were at times unavailable.

When the Treaty of Versailles entered into force on January 10, 1920, the province's eastern frontier became the border to the newly created Second Polish Republic, comprising most of Pomerelia in the Polish Corridor. Minor border adjustments followed, where 9,5 km^{2} of the province became Polish and 74 km^{2} of former West Prussia (parts of the former counties of Neustadt in Westpreußen and Karthaus) were merged into the province.

== Province of the Free State of Prussia ==
After the Kaiser was forced to abdicate, the province became part of the Free State of Prussia within the Weimar Republic.

=== German Revolution of 1918–19 ===
During the German Revolution of 1918–19, revolutionary councils of soldiers and workers took over the Pomeranian towns (Stralsund on November 9, Stettin, Greifswald, Pasewalk, Stargard, and Swinemünde on November 10, Barth, Bütow, Neustettin, Köslin, and Stolp on November 11). On January 5, 1919, workers' and soldiers' councils (Arbeiter- und Soldatenräte) were in charge of most of the province (231 towns and rural municipalities). The revolution was peaceful, no riots are reported. The councils were led by Social Democrats, who cooperated with the provincial administration. Of the 21 Landrat officials, only five were replaced, while of the three heads of the government regions ("Regierungspräsident") two were replaced (in Stralsund and Köslin) in 1919.

On November 12, 1918, a decree was issued allowing farmworkers' unions to negotiate with farmers (Junkers). The decree further regulated work time and wages for farmworkers.

On May 15, 1919, street fights and plunder occurred following Communist assemblies in Stettin. The revolt was put down by the military. In late August, strikes of farmworkers occurred in the counties of Neustettin (Szczecinek) and Belgard (Białogard). The power of the councils however declined, only a few were left in the larger towns in 1920.

=== Counter-revolution ===
Conservative and right-wing groups evolved in opposition to the revolutions' achievements. Landowners formed the Pommerscher Landbund in February 1919, which by 1921 had 120,000 members and from the beginning was supplied with arms by the 2nd army corps in Stettin. Paramilitias ("Einwohnerwehr") formed throughout the spring of 1919.

Pommerscher Landbund units participated in the nationalist Kapp Putsch in Berlin, 1920.

Members of the "Iron Division" (Eiserne Division), a dissolved Freikorps in the Baltic, reorganized in Pomerania, where the Junkers hosted them on their estates as a private army.

Also, counter-revolutionary Pomeranians formed Freikorps participating in fights in the Ruhr area.

=== Constitution of 1920 ===
In 1920 (changed in 1921 and 1924), the Free State of Prussia adopted a democratic constitution for her provinces. The constitution granted a number of civil rights to the Prussian population and enhanced the self-government of the provinces.

The provincial and county parliaments (Landtag and Kreistag) were hence elected directly by the population, including women, in free and secret votes.

The "Provinzialverband", which included all self-governmental institutions of the province such as the provincial parliament (Provinziallandtag), gained influence on the formerly Berlin-led provincial government: The Provinzialverband would hence elect the "Oberpräsident" (head of the administration) and appoint representatives for the Reichsrat assembly in Berlin. Furthermore, the Provinzialverband officials could hence self determine how to spend the money they received from Berlin. From 1919 to 1930 Julius Lippmann served as governor of the province.

=== Economy ===
The border changes however caused a severe decline in the province's economy. Farther Pomerania was cut off from Danzig (Gdańsk) by the so-called corridor. Former markets and supplies in the now Polish territories became unavailable.

Farther Pomeranian farmers had sold their products primarily to the eastern provinces, that were now part of the Second Polish Republic. Due to high transport costs, the markets in the West were unavailable too. The farmers reacted by modernizing their equipment, improving the quality of their products, and applying new technical methods. As a consequence, more than half of the farmers were severely indebted in 1927. The government reacted with the Osthilfe program, and granted credits to favourable conditions.

Stettin particularly suffered from a post-war change in trade routes. Before the territorial changes, it had been on the export route from the Katowice industrial region in now Polish Upper Silesia. Poland changed this export route to a new inner-Polish railway connecting Katowice with the new-build port of Gdynia within the corridor.

As a counter-measure, Prussia invested in the Stettin port since 1923. While initially successful, a new economical recession led to the closure of one of Stettin's major shipyard, AG Vulcan Stettin, in 1927.

The province also reacted to the availability of new traffic vehicles. Roads were developed due to the upcoming cars and buses, four towns got electric street cars, and an international airport was built in Altdamm (Dąbie) near Stettin.

The Pomeranian agriculture underwent a crisis. Programs were started to regain soil that had turned into swamps during the wartime, and even to establish new settlements by setting up settlement societies. The results were mixed. On the one hand, 130,858 hectares (1,308.58 km^{2}; 505.25 sq mi) of farmland were settled with 8,734 new-build settlements until 1933. The settlers originated in Pomerania itself, Saxony, and Thuringia, also refugees from the former Province of Posen settled in the province. On the other hand, people left the rural communities en masse and turned to Pomeranian and other urban centers (Landflucht). In 1925, 50.7% of the Pomeranians worked in agricultural professions, this percentage dropped to 38.2% in 1933.

With the economic recession, unemployment rates reached 12% in 1933, compared to an overall 19% in the empire.

== Nazi era ==
=== Pomeranian Nazi movement before 1933 ===
Throughout the existence of the Weimar Republic, politics in the province was dominated by the nationalist conservative DNVP (Deutschnationale Volkspartei, German National People's Party); an entity composed of nationalists, monarchists, radical volkisch and anti-semitic elements, and supported by Pan-German League an old organisation believing in superiority of German people over others. The Nazi party (NSDAP) did not have any significant success at elections, nor did it have a substantial number of members. The Pomeranian Nazi party was founded by students of the University of Greifswald in 1922, when the NSDAP was officially forbidden. The university's rector Theodor Vahlen became Gauleiter (head of the provincial party) in 1924. Soon afterwards, he was fired by the university and went bankrupt. In 1924, the party had 330 members, and in December 1925, 297 members. The party was not present in all of the province. The members were concentrated mainly in Western Pomerania and internally divided. Vahlen retired from the Gauleiter position in 1927 and was replaced by Walther von Corswant, a Pomeranian knight estate holder.

Corswant led the party from his estate in Kuntzow. In the 1928 Reichstag elections, the Nazis got 1.5% of the votes in Pomerania. Party property was partially pawned. In 1929, the party gained 4.1% of the votes. Corswant was fired after conflicts with the party's leadership and replaced with Wilhelm Karpenstein, one of the former students who formed the Pomeranian Nazi party in 1922 and since 1929 a lawyer in Greifswald. He moved the headquarters to Stettin and replaced many of the party officials predominantly with young radicals. In the Reichstag elections of September 14, 1930, the party gained a significant 24.3% of the Pomeranian votes and thus became the second strongest party, the strongest still being the DNVP, which however was internally divided in the early 1930s.

In the elections of July 1932, the Nazis gained 48% of the Pomeranian votes, while the DNVP dropped to 15.8%. In March 1933, the NSDAP gained 56.3%.

=== Nazi government since 1933 ===
Immediately after their gain of power, the Nazis began arresting their opponents. In March 1933, 200 people were arrested, this number rose to 600 during the following months. In Stettin-Bredow (Szczecin-Drzetowo), at the site of the bankrupt Vulcan shipyards, the Nazis set up a short-lived "wild" concentration camp from October 1933 to March 1934, where SA maltreated their victims. The Pomeranian SA in 1933 had grown to 100,000 members.

Oberpräsident Carl von Halfern retired in 1933, and with him one third of the Landrat and Oberbürgermeister (mayor) officials.

Also in 1933, an election was held for a new provincial parliament, which then had a Nazi majority. Decrees were issued that shifted all issues formerly in responsibility of the parliament to the Provinzialausschuß commission, and furthermore, shifted the power to decide on these issues from the Provinzialausschuß to the Oberpräsident official, although he had to hear the Provinzialrat commission before. Once the power was shifted to the Oberpräsident with the Provinzialrat as an advisor, all organs of the Provinzialverband (Provinziallandtag (parliament), Provinzialausschuß and all other commissions), the former self-administration of the province, were dissolved except for the downgraded Provinzialrat, which assembled about once a year without making use of its advisory rights. The Landeshauptmann position, the Provinzialverband's head, was not abolished. From 1933, Landeshauptmann would be a Nazi who was acting in line with the Oberpräsident. The law entered into force on April 1, 1934.

In 1934, many of the heads of the Pomeranian Nazi-movement were exchanged. SA leader Peter von Heydebreck was shot in Stadelheim near Munich due to his friendship to Röhm. Gauleiter Karpenstein was arrested for two years and banned from Pomerania due to conflicts with the NSDAP headquarters. His successor, Franz Schwede-Coburg, replaced most of Karpenstein's staff with Corswant's earlier staff, friends of him from Bavaria, and SS. From the 27 Kreisleiter officials, 23 were forced out of office by Schwede-Coburg, who became Gauleiter on July 21, and Oberpräsident on July 28, 1934.

As in all of Nazi Germany, the Nazis established totalitarian control over the province through their policy of Gleichschaltung.

=== Deportation of the Pomeranian Jews ===
In 1933, about 7,800 Jews lived in Pomerania, of which a third lived in Stettin (Szczecin). The other two thirds were living all over the province, Jewish communities numbering more than 200 people were in Stettin, Kolberg (Kołobrzeg), Lauenburg in Pomerania (Lębork), and Stolp (Słupsk).

When the Nazis started to terrorize Jews, many emigrated. Twenty weeks after the Nazis seized power, the number of Jewish Pomeranians had already dropped by eight percent.

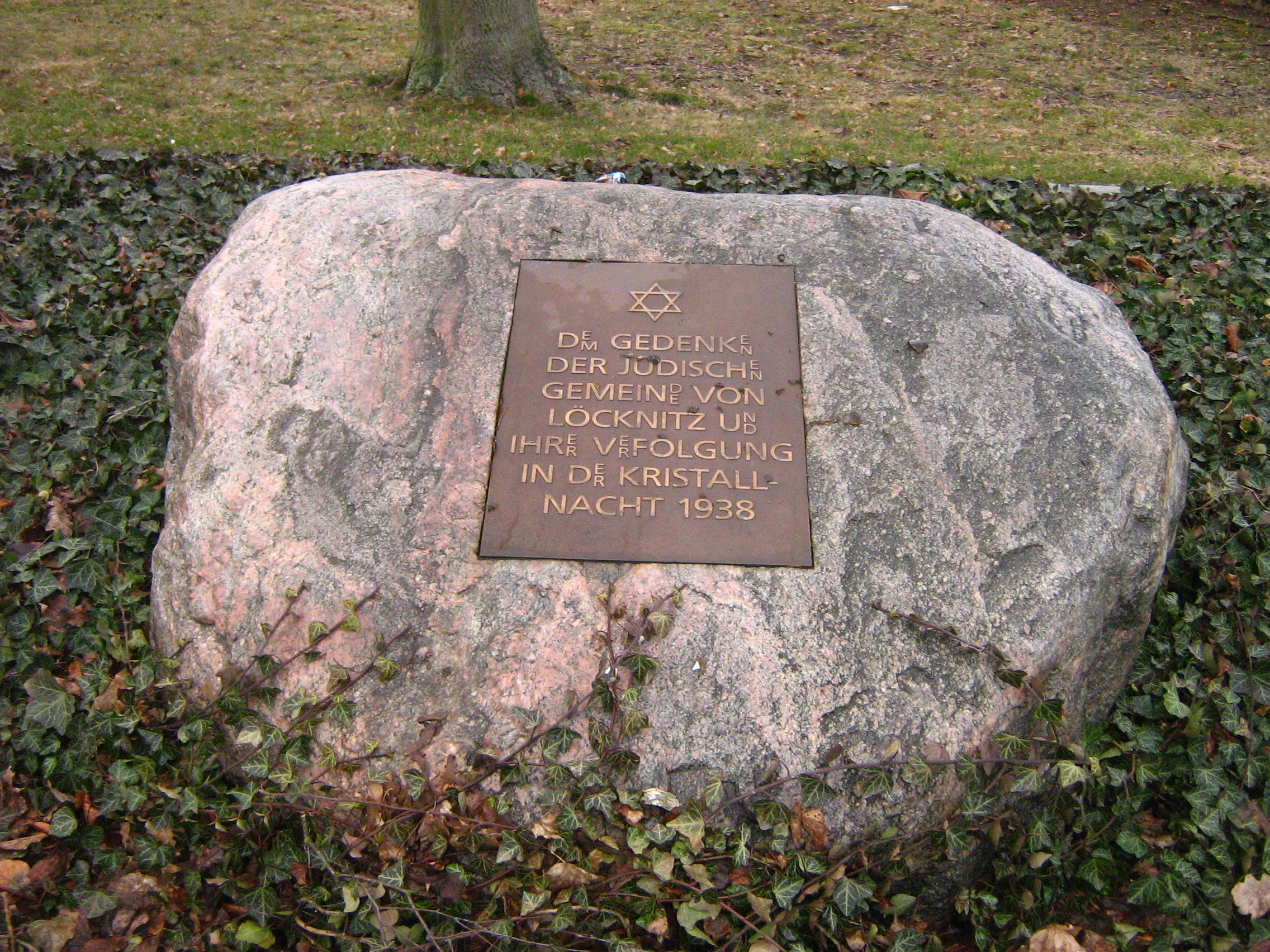
Memorial to the victims of the Kristallnacht in Löcknitz

Besides the repressions Jews had to endure in all Nazi Germany, including the destruction of the Pomeranian synagogues on November 9, 1938 (Reichskristallnacht), all male Stettin Jews were deported to Oranienburg concentration camp after this event and kept there for several weeks.

On February 12 and 13, 1940, 1,000 to 1,300 Pomeranian Jews, regardless of sex, age and health, were deported from Stettin and Schneidemühl to the Lublin-Lipowa Reservation, that had been set up following the Nisko Plan in occupied Poland. Among the deported were intermarried non-Jewish women. The deportation was carried out in an inhumane manner. Despite low temperatures, the carriages were not heated. No food had been allowed to be taken along. The property left behind was liquidated. Up to 300 people perished from the deportation itself. In the Lublin area under Kurt Engel's regime, the people were subjected to inhumane treatment, starvation and outright murder. Only a few survived the war.

Peter Simonstein Cullman in "History of the Jewish Community of Schneidemühl: 1641 to the Holocaust" and jewishgen.org say that the Jews of Schneidemühl were not "deported together with the more than 1,000 Jews of Stettin [Region] (who were subsequently sent to Piaski, near Lublin in Poland)", based on lack of evidence in the archives of Reichsvereinigung der Juden in Deutschland (cf. file 75 C Re1, No. 483, Bundesarchiv Berlin, and USHMM Archives: RG-14.003M; Acc. 1993.A.059). He concludes that "while the deportations of the Jews of Schneidemühl had indeed been planned by the Gestapo to coincide with the terrible events that occurred in Stettin – those actions were not carried out together. The deportations of all Jews from the Gau were primarily planned on orders of Franz Schwede-Coburg, the notorious Gauleiter of Pomerania, in cahoots with several Nazi authorities of Schneidemühl. The Gauleiter’s personal goal was to be the first in the Reich to declare his Gau Judenrein – cleansed of Jews". He based his statement on doc. 795 of the Trial of Adolf Eichmann.

According to Cullmann, the following events took place in Schneidemühl: "On February 15, 1940, an order had been issued by the Gestapo in Schneidemühl that the Jews of that town should get ready to be deported within a week, ostensibly to the Generalgouvernement in Eastern Poland. When Dr. Hildegard Böhme of the Reichsvereinigung had become aware of Gauleiter Schwede-Coburg's plan – and fearing a repetition of the events on the scale of the Stettin deportations – her timely and tireless intervention on behalf of the Reichsvereinigung with the RSHA in Berlin resulted in a modification of the planned deportations of Schneidemühl's Jews. The Stapo, the State police in Schneidemühl, however, played its own part in the planned round-up of the city's Jews by giving in to the local Nazi Party cadre and to the orders of the city's fanatic Mayor Friedrich Rogausch, in concert with the Gauleiter. The latter two are known to have planned a Schneidemühl-Aktion as a revenge for the earlier interference by the Reichsvereinigung in the Stettin deportations. Thus on Wednesday, February 21, 1940 – merely one week after the Stettin deportations – one hundred and sixty Jews were arrested in Schneidemühl, while mass arrests of Jews took place concurrently within an 80 km (50 mi) radius of Schneidemühl, in the surrounding administrative districts of Köslin, Stettin and the former Grenzmark Posen-Westpreussen, whereby three hundred and eighty-four Jews were seized by the Gestapo. In total 544 Jews were arrested during the entire Aktion in and around Schneidemühl. Those rounded up ranged from two-year-old children to ninety-year-old men. Surviving documents give a grim account of the subsequent Odyssey of those arrested. By then it had been decreed in Berlin that the victims of the round-up should not be sent to Poland but be kept within the so-called Altreich, i.e. within Germany's borders of 1937. Over the following eighteen months most of the arrested became ensnared in the Nazi's maw – on a journey of terminal despair. Only one young woman from Schneidemühl survived the hell of Auschwitz-Birkenau and the death marches of mid-January 1945."

=== Repressions against Polish minority ===
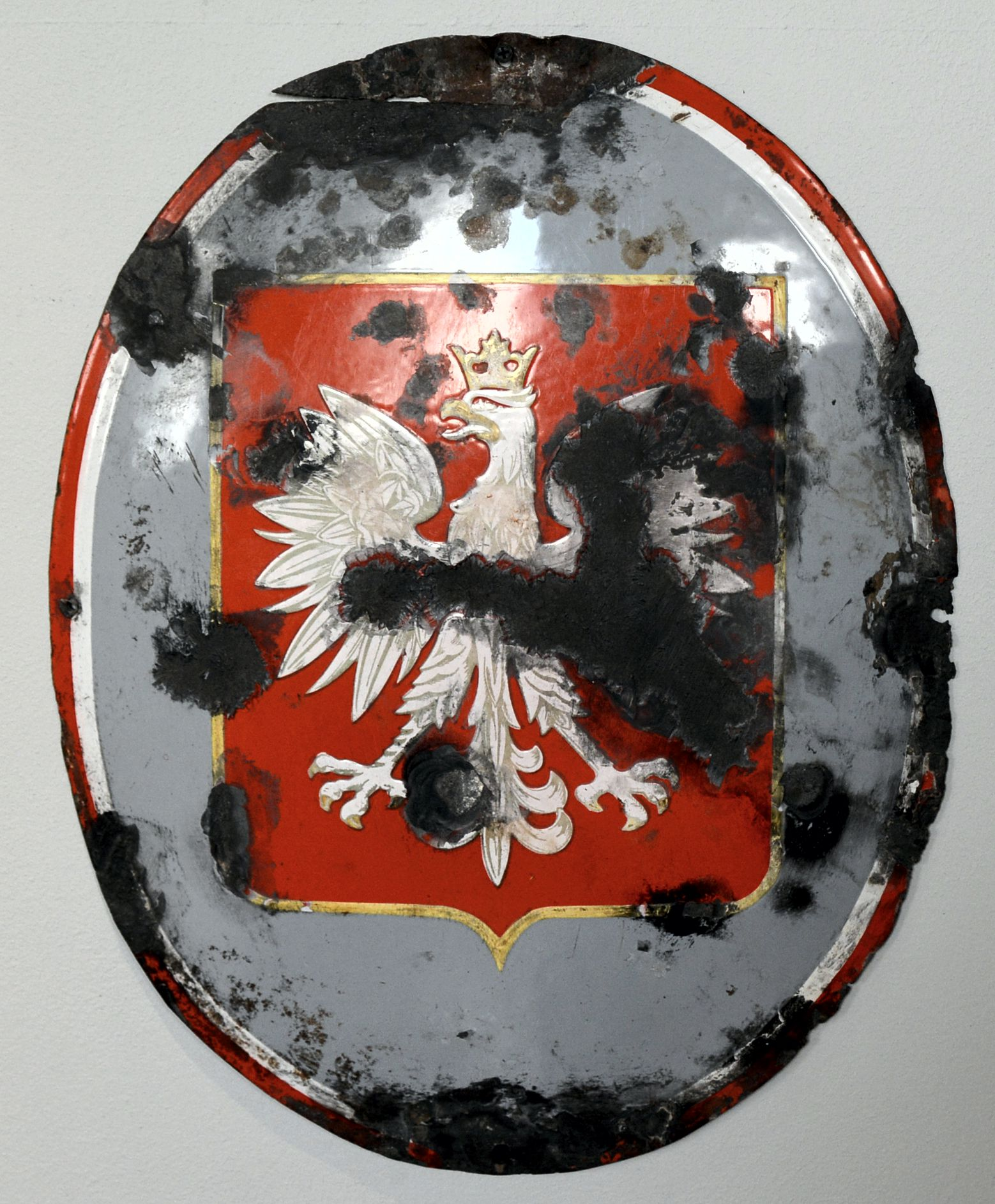
Emblem of the pre-war Polish Consulate in Szczecin, removed from the consulate building by the Germans in September 1939 and thrown into the Oder River; now an exhibit of the National Museum in Szczecin

Grzęda (1994) says that in 1910, according to German data, 10,500 Poles lived in the Stettin (Szczecin) area, and that in his view the number was most likely reduced. Fenske (1993) and Buchholz et al. (1999) say that in 1910, 7,921 Poles lived steadily in the province; Skóra (2001) says that in 1925, according to German data, 5,914 Poles lived in the province (1,104 in the Stettin and 4,226 in the Köslin government regions), while the Polish consul "boldly assumed" that over 9000 Poles lived in the province. Wynot (1996) says that during the interwar era, between 22,500 and 27,000 Poles lived "along the border of the Poznan/Pomorze region", the majority of whom were peasants, with a small number of shopkeepers and craftsmen. In addition, "a colony of about 2,000 workers" existed in Stettin.

To maintain contact with the Poles of the province, Poland opened a consulate in Szczecin in 1925.

A number of the Poles in Szczecin (Stettin) were members of the Union of Poles in Germany, a Polish scouts team was established there as well, in addition to a Polish school where the Polish language was taught.

Repressions intensified after Adolf Hitler came to power and led to closing of the school. Members of Polish community who took part in cultural and political activities were persecuted and even murdered. In 1938 the head of Stettin's Union of Poles unit Stanisław Borkowski was imprisoned in Oranienburg. In 1939, all Polish organisations in Stettin were disbanded by the authorities. During the war, two teachers from Polish school: Golisz and Omieczyński were murdered.

=== Resistance ===
Resistance groups formed in the economical centers, especially in Stettin, from where most arrests were reported.

Resistance is also reported from members of the nationalist conservative DNVP. The monarchist Herbert von Bismarck-Lasbeck was forced out of office in 1933. The newspaper Pommersche Tagespost was banned in 1935 after printing an article of monarchist Hans Joachim von Rohr (1888–1971). In 1936, four members of the DNVP were tried for founding a monarchist organization.

Other DNVP members, who had addressed their opposition already before 1933, were arrested multiple times after the Nazis had taken over. Ewald Kleist-Schmenzin, Karl Magnus von Knebel-Doberitz, and Karl von Zitzewitz were active resistants.

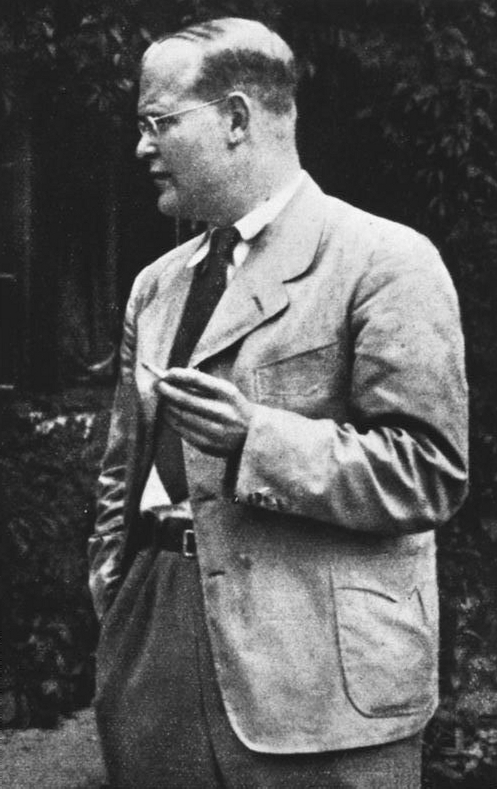
Dietrich Bonhoeffer

Within the Pomeranian provincial subsection of the Evangelical Church of the old-Prussian Union, resistance was organized within the Pfarrernotbund (150 members in late 1933) and Confessing Church (Bekennende Kirche), the successor organization, headed by Reinold von Thadden-Trieglaff. In March 1935, 55 priests were arrested. The Confessing Church maintained a preachers' seminar headed by Dietrich Bonhoeffer in Zingst, which moved to Finkenwalde (Zdroje) in 1935 and to Köslin and Groß Schlönwitz (Słonowice) in 1940. Within the Catholic Church, the most prominent resistance member was Greifswald priest Alfons Wachsmann, who was executed in 1944.

After the failed assassination attempt of Hitler on July 20, 1944, Gestapo arrested thirteen Pomeranian nobles and one burgher, all knight estate owners. Of those, Ewald von Kleist-Schmenzin had contacted Winston Churchill in 1938 to inform about the work of the German opposition to the Nazis, and was executed in April 1945. Karl von Zitzewitz had connections to the Kreisauer Kreis group. Among the other arrested were Malte von Veltheim Fürst zu Putbus, who died in a concentration camp, as well as Alexander von Kameke and Oscar Caminecci-Zettuhn, who both were executed.

== World War II and aftermath ==
=== First war years ===
The invasion of Poland by the Nazi Germany on September 1, 1939, which marked the beginning of World War II, was in part mounted from the province's soil. General Guderian's 19th army corps attacked from the Schlochau (Człuchów) and Preußisch Friedland (Debrzno) areas, which since 1938 belonged to the province ("Grenzmark Posen-Westpreußen").

The pre-war persecution of Poles in the province further intensified in September 1939 with mass arrests of Polish activists, teachers etc., who were then sent to concentration camps.

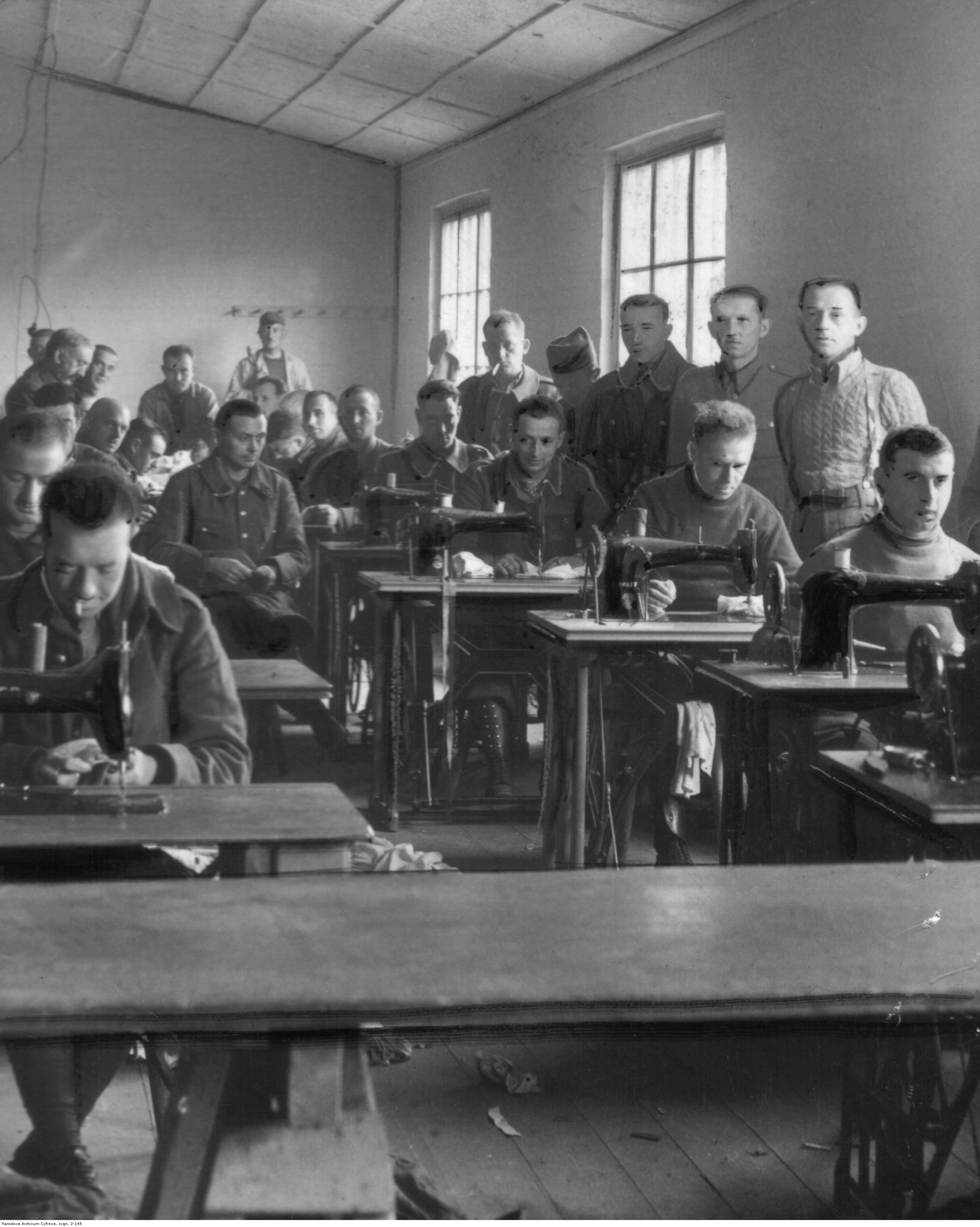
Polish prisoners of war in Stalag II-B

According to Kozłowski & Krzywicki (1988), around 56,000 Polish POWs were located in Pomerania after the invasion, and soon Germany stripped them of their status (against international law) turning them into forced labourers; in April 1940 they were 82,417 of them in Pomerania, with the number reaching 116,330 Polish forced labourers in 1944 September

Because the invasion of Poland (and later the Soviet Union) was a success and the battle front moved far more east (Blitzkrieg), the province was not the site of battles in the first years of the war.

Germany operated several prisoner-of-war camps, including Stalag II-B, Stalag II-C, Stalag II-D, Stalag II-E, Stalag Luft I, Stalag Luft II, Stalag Luft IV, Stalag Luft 7, Stalag 302, Stalag 351, Oflag II-B, Oflag II-C, Oflag II-D and Oflag 65, for Polish POWs and civilians, including women and children, and French, Belgian, Dutch, Serbian, Italian, American, Canadian, Australian, New Zealander, Czech, Soviet, Senegalese, Tunisian, Moroccan, Algerian, South African and other Allied POWs, with numerous forced labour subcamps in the region.

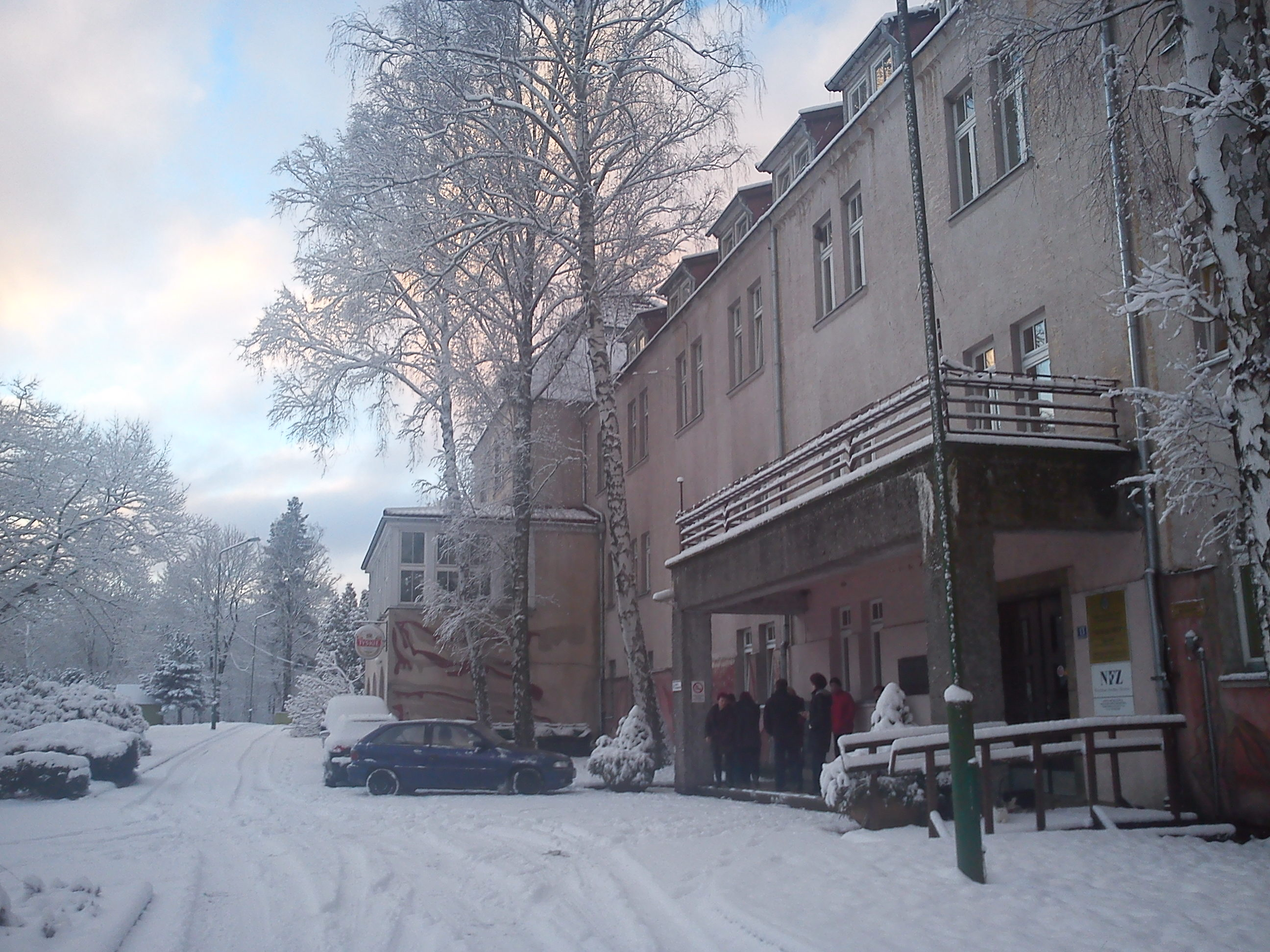
Former Germanisation camp for kidnapped Polish children in Połczyn-Zdrój

There were also several subcamps of the Stutthof concentration camp and several Nazi prisons with numerous forced labour subcamps in the region. Połczyn-Zdrój was the location of a Germanisation camp for kidnapped Polish children. Piła, Unieszyno and Police housed camps for Sinti and Romani people (see Romani Holocaust).

The Polish resistance movement was active in the region, including the Odra organization and local units of the Home Army. Activities included espionage of German military activity, infiltration of the local German industry, sabotage actions, distribution of Polish underground press, and facilitating escapes of Polish and British prisoners of war who fled from German POW camps by the Baltic Sea to neutral Sweden.

Since 1943, the province became a target of allied air raids. The first attack was launched against Stettin on April 21, 1943, and left 400 dead. On August 17/18, the British RAF launched an attack on Peenemünde, where Wernher von Braun and his staff had developed and tested the world's first ballistic missiles. In October, Anklam was a target. Throughout 1944 and early 1945, Stettin's industrial and residential areas were targets of air raids. Stralsund was a target in October 1944.

Despite these raids, the province was regarded "safe" compared to other areas of the Third Reich, and thus became a shelter for evacuees primarily from hard-hit Berlin and the West German industrial centers.

The Pomeranian Wall was renovated in the summer of 1944, and in the fall all men between sixteen and sixty years of age who had not yet been drafted were enrolled into Volkssturm units.

In early 1945, German-perpetrated death marches of prisoners of German POW camps and concentration camps passed through the region.

The province of Pomerania became a battlefield on January 26, 1945, when in the beginning of the Red Army's East Pomeranian Offensive Soviet tanks entered the province near Schneidemühl (Piła), which surrendered on February 13.

=== East Pomeranian Offensive ===
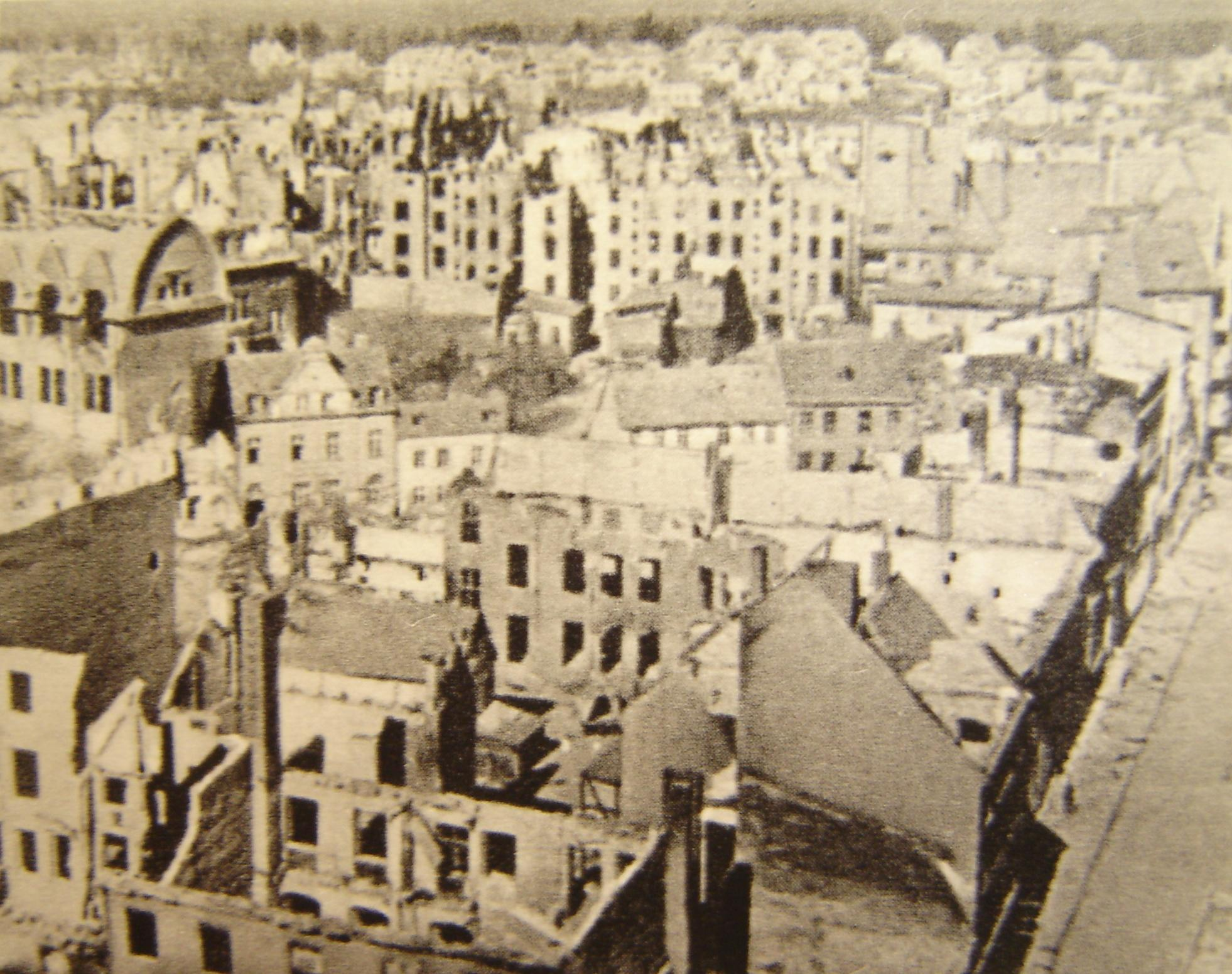
The Battle of Kolberg left 80% of the town in ruins.

On February 14, the remnants of German Army Group Vistula (Heeresgruppe Weichsel) had managed to set up a frontline roughly at the province's southern frontier, and launched a counterattack (Operation Solstice, "Sonnenwende") on February 15, that however stalled already on February 18. On February 24, the Second Belorussian Front launched the East Pomeranian Offensive and despite heavy resistance primarily in the Rummelsburg (Miastko) area took eastern Farther Pomerania until March 10. On March 1, the First Belorussian Front had launched an offensive from the Stargard and Märkisch Friedland (Mirosławiec) area and succeeded in taking northwestern Farther Pomerania within five days. Cut off corps group Tettau retreated to Dziwna as a moving pocket until March 11. Thus, German-held central Farther Pomerania was cut off, and taken after the Battle of Kolberg (March 4 to 18).

The fast advances of the Red Army during the East Pomeranian Offensive caught the civilian Farther Pomeranian population by surprise. The land route to the west was blocked since early March. Evacuation orders were issued not at all or much too late. The only way out of Farther Pomerania was via the ports of Stolpmünde (Ustka), from which 18,300 were evacuated, Rügenwalde (Darłowo), from which 4,300 were evacuated, and Kolberg, which had been declared fortress and from which before the end of the Battle of Kolberg some 70,000 were evacuated. Those left behind became victims of murder, war rape, and plunder. On March 6, the USAF shelled Swinemünde, where thousands of refugees were stranded, killing an estimated 25,000.

=== Battle of Berlin ===
On March 20, the Wehrmacht abandoned the last bridgehead on the Oder rivers eastern bank, the Altdamm area. The frontline then ran along Dziwna and lower Oder, and was held by the 3rd Panzer Army commanded by general Hasso von Manteuffel. After another four days of fighting, the Red Army managed to break through and cross the Oder between Stettin and Gartz (Oder), thus starting the northern theater of the Battle of Berlin on March 24. Stettin was abandoned the next day.

Throughout April, the Second Belorussian Front led by general Konstantin Rokossovsky advanced through Western Pomerania. Demmin and Greifswald surrendered on April 30.

In Demmin, more than 1,000 people committed mass suicides after the Red Army had conquered the town facing only modest resistance. Coroner lists show that most drowned in the nearby River Tollense and River Peene, while others poisoned themselves. This was fueled by atrocities – rapes, pillage and executions – committed by Red Army soldiers after the Peene-bridge had been destroyed by retreating German troops. 80 percent of the town was destroyed in the first 3 days after its conquest.

In the first days of May, Wehrmacht abandoned Usedom and Wollin islands, and on May 5, the last German troops departed from Sassnitz on the island of Rügen. Two days later, Wehrmacht surrendered unconditionally to the Red Army.

=== Dissolution of the province ===
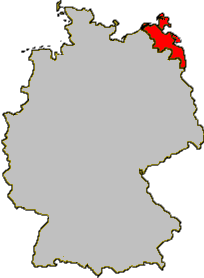
Western part of the former province (Western Pomerania, Vorpommern, red) in modern Germany (grey)

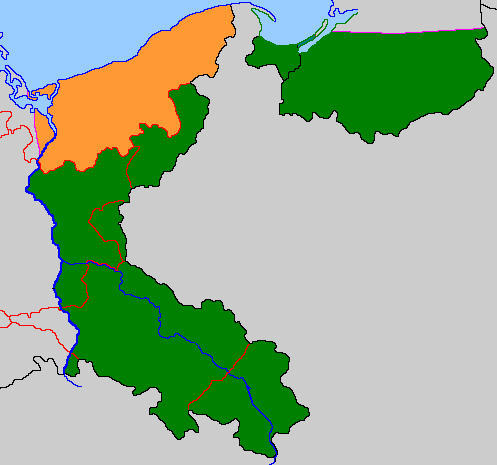
Post-war Polish part of the pre-1937 province of Pomernia

By the terms of the Potsdam Agreement, Western Pomerania east of the Oder–Neisse line became part of Poland. This line left the Oder river north of Gartz (Oder) and included the Szczecin and Świnoujście area into the Polish state. The remaining German population was expelled in accordance with the Potsdam Agreement and the area was resettled with Poles. Western Pomerania west of the Oder-Neisse line was merged with Mecklenburg to constitute the state of Mecklenburg-Vorpommern in the Soviet occupation zone of Germany, that in 1949 became the German Democratic Republic (GDR). Vorpommern was soon dropped from the federal state's name, and after the GDR states were abolished, the coastal Western Pomeranian Landkreis districts became part of Bezirk Rostock whereas the mainland Landkreis districts became part of Bezirk Neubrandenburg.

In 1990, after the GDR communist system was overthrown, the state of Mecklenburg-Vorpommern was recreated, with Vorpommern being a non-administrative region. The districts Vorpommern-Rügen and Vorpommern-Greifswald constitute most of the German part of former Pomerania, but these districts also contain some former Mecklenburgian territory, and a small part of former Pomerania is now part of Brandenburg. Due to this, the old Pomeranian border disappeared from the map and today is only prevailed by the border of the Pomeranian Evangelical Church. The part of the province of Pomerania which had become Polish was re-organized as Szczecin Voivodeship after the war, from which the eastern part was split off as Koszalin Voivodeship in 1950. Słupsk Voivodeship was split off from this voivodeship in 1975, there were also territorial exchanges with neighboring voivodeships. Since 1999, the area of the former province of Pomerania is included in the West Pomeranian Voivodeship (Zachodniopomorskie, bulk) and Pomeranian Voivodeship (western part around Słupsk).

== Administrative subdivisions ==
=== Köslin government region (Farther Pomerania) ===
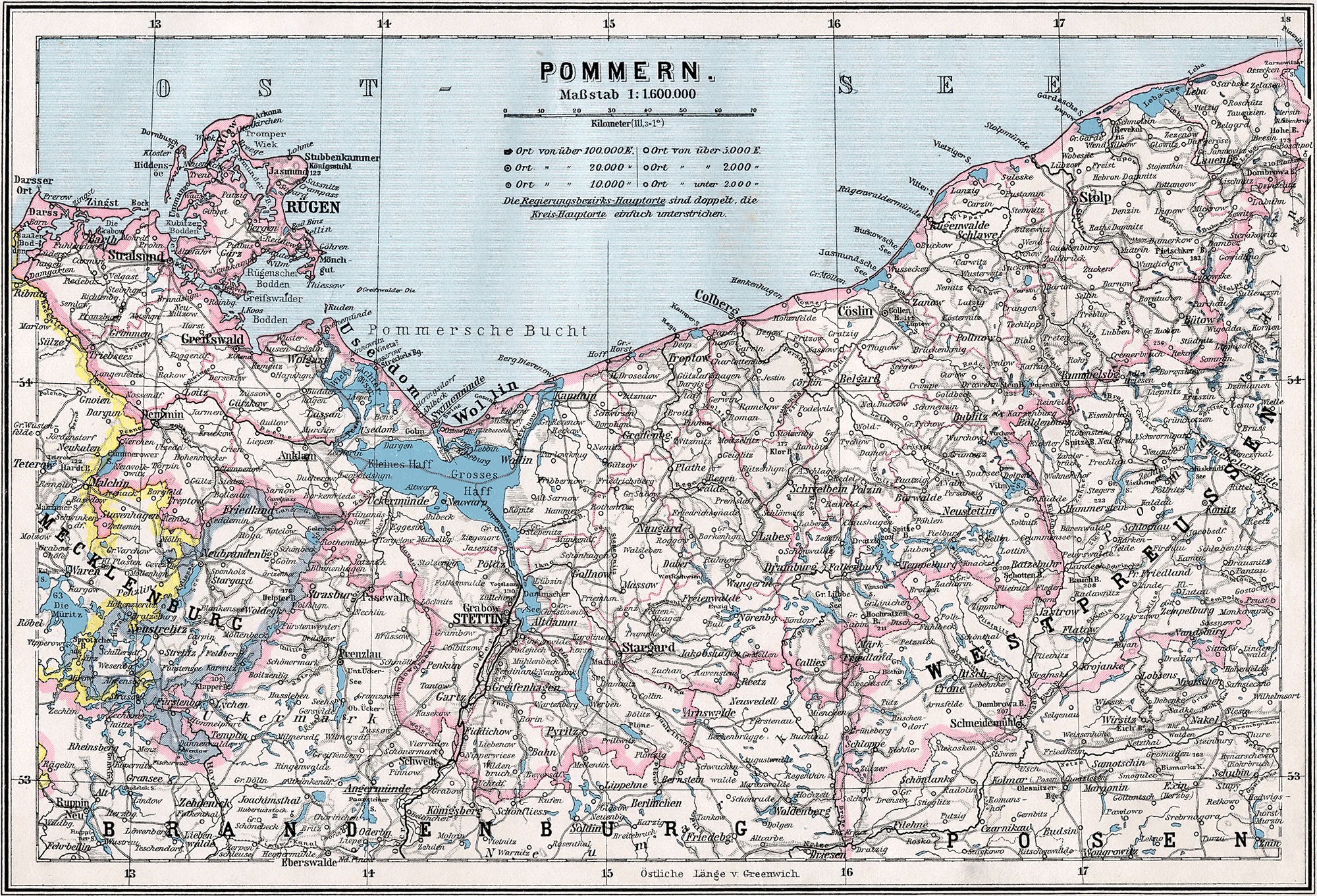
Province of Pomerania in 1905

The Köslin government region (Regierungsbezirk Köslin) was the administrative name for the region of Farther Pomerania (Hinterpommern) along with the smaller region of Lauenburg and Bütow Land (easternmost part).

These parts of Pomerania were integrated into the Brandenburg-Prussian Province of Pomerania (1653–1815) already after the Thirty Years' War. During the war, the noble House of Pomerania (Griffins), ruling the Duchy of Pomerania since the 1120s, became extinct in the male line with the death of Bogislaw XIV in 1637. Throughout the existence of the Griffin Duchy, Brandenburg had claimed overlordship and was asserted of Pomerania inheritance in numerous treaties. Yet, Sweden had been one of the most important players in the war and as such, she was awarded some of her territorial gains in Pomerania after the war by the Peace of Westphalia, thwarting Brandenburg-Prussia's ambitions for inheritance of the whole former Duchy of Pomerania. This led to tensions between Brandenburg-Prussia and Sweden in Pomerania until Sweden lost her Western Pomeranian possessions in 1720 (Stettin government region) and 1815 (Stralsund government region).

Landkreis Lauenburg-Bütow comprised the Lauenburg and Bütow Land, a Pomerelian borderland with a somewhat different history than the rest of Pomerania. It was in 1846 dissolved into smaller administrative units. In contrast to ethnic German Pomerania, this area also had a Kashubian population.

Landkreis Fürstenthum comprised the earlier secular possessions of the Roman Catholic Diocese of Kammin prince-bishops, and was ruled by administrators from the Pomeranian ducal house since the aftermath of the Reformation until 1650. Until 1872, the area kept its territorial integrity, before it was dissolved into smaller administrative units.

==== Subdivisions ====
- urban districts (Stadtkreise):
  - Stolp: population 27,293 (1900); 50,377 (1939)
  - Köslin: split off Landkreis Köslin in 1923, population 33,479 (1939)
  - Kolberg: split off Landkreis Kolberg-Körlin in 1920, population 36,617 (1939)
- rural districts (Landkreise):
  - Landkreis Belgard (Persante): population 47,097 (1900); 79,183 (1939)
  - Landkreis Dramburg: population 35,863 (1900);
  - Landkreis Fürstenthum (1816–1872), 1872 divided into
    - Landkreis Bublitz: population 20,916 (1900); in 1932 merged into Landkreis Köslin
    - Landkreis Kolberg-Körlin: population 57,871 (1900); 38,785 (1939)
    - Landkreis Köslin: population 48,678 (1900); 80,287 (1939)
  - Landkreis Greifenberg i. Pom.: until 1939 administered by Regierungsbezirk Stettin, population 47,891 (1939)
  - Landkreis Lauenburg-Bütow (the Lauenburg and Bütow Land), 1846 divided into:
    - Landkreis Bütow: population 26,021 (1900); 28,018 (1939)
    - Landkreis Lauenburg i. Pom.: population 45,986 (1900); 63,985 (1939)
  - Landkreis Neustettin: population 76,101 (1900); since 1938 administered by Regierungsbezirk Grenzmark Posen-Westpreußen
  - Landkreis Regenwalde: 49,668 (1939), until 1938 administered by Regierungsbezirk Stettin
  - Landkreis Rummelsburg i. Pom.: population 33,785 (1900); 40,692 (1939)
  - Landkreis Schivelbein: population 19,656 (1900); in 1932 merged into Landkreis Belgard (Persante)
  - Landkreis Schlawe i. Pom.: population 73,206 (1900); 78,363 (1939)
  - Landkreis Stolp: population 75,310 (1900); 83,009 (1939)

=== Stettin government region (Western Pomerania) ===
The Stettin government region (Regierungsbezirk Stettin) since 1932 comprised the region of Western Pomerania (Vorpommern, "Hither Pomerania"), the former Swedish Pomerania. From 1815, the Stettin government region comprised only the southern parts of Western Pomerania (Old Western Pomerania, i.e. south of the Peene river). This part had been Swedish only until 1720, thereafter it was merged into the Prussian Province of Pomerania (1653–1815). New Western Pomerania (north of the river) was administered as Regierungsbezirk Stralsund until it was merged into Regierungsbezirk Stettin in 1932.

Stettin, the former ducal residence, was made capital of the province and also was the administrative center of the Regierungsbezirk Stettin.

==== Subdivisions ====
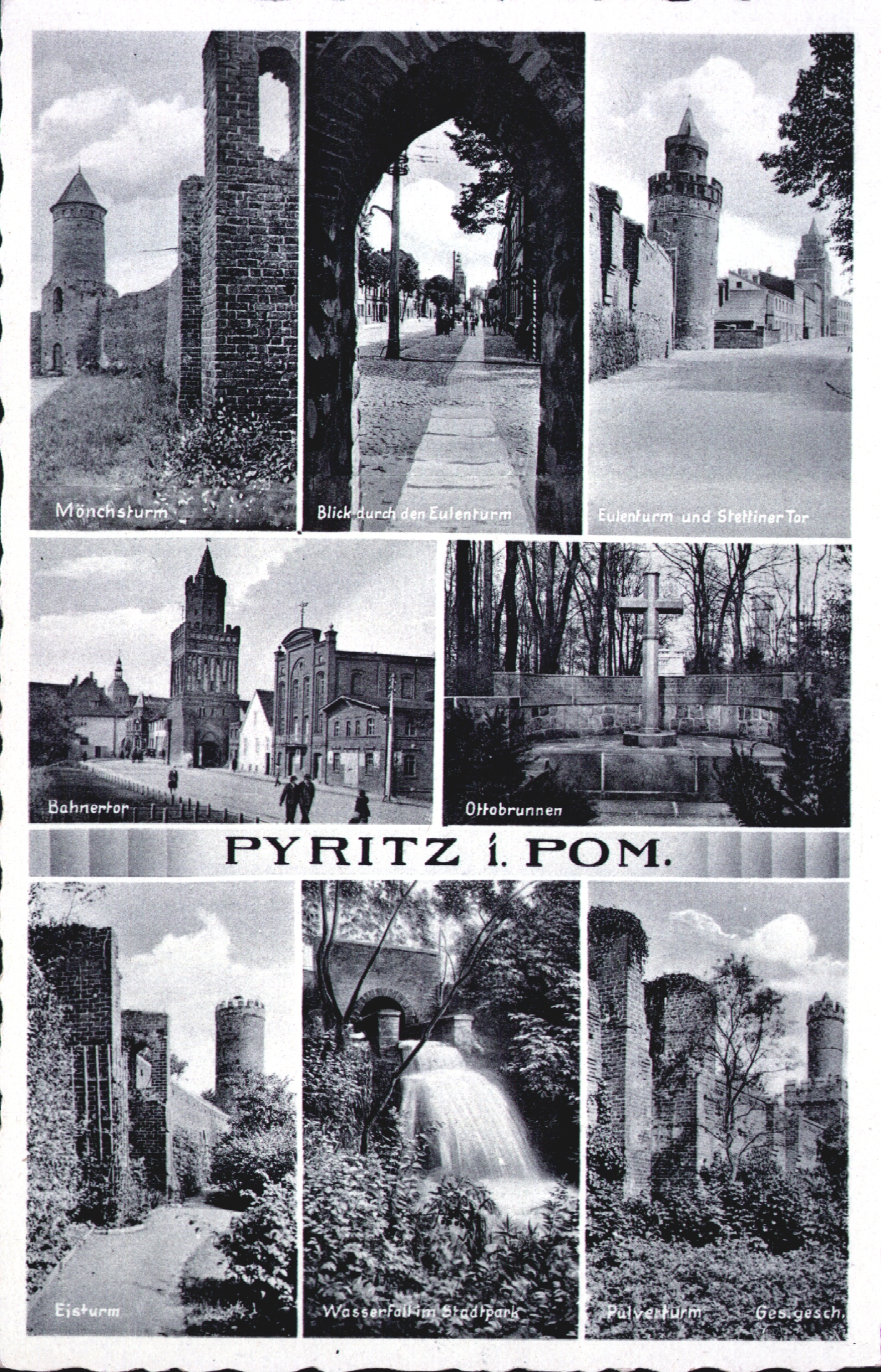
Pyritz (Pyrzyce)

- urban districts (Stadtkreise):
  - Greifswald: until 1932 administered by Regierungsbezirk Stralsund, population 37,051 (1939)
  - Stargard (Pommern): split off Landkreis Saatzig in 1901, population 39,760 (1939)
  - Stettin: population 210,702 (1900); 382,984 (1939)
  - Stralsund: until 1932 administered by Regierungsbezirk Stralsund, population 52,931 (1939)
- rural districts (Landkreise):
  - Landkreis Anklam: population 32,693 (1900); 39,527 (1939)
  - Landkreis Cammin i. Pom.: population 42,485 (1900); 45,694 (1939)
  - Landkreis Demmin: population 48,090 (1900); 54,769 (1939)
  - Landkreis Franzburg-Barth (Capital: Barth): until 1932 administered by Regierungsbezirk Stralsund, population 55,542 (1939)
  - Landkreis Greifenberg i. Pom.: population 37,483 (1900); after 1939 administered by Regierungsbezirk Köslin
  - Landkreis Greifenhagen: population 48,258 (1900); 69,326 (1939)
  - Landkreis Greifswald: until 1932 administered by Regierungsbezirk Stralsund, population 39,207 (1939)
  - Landkreis Grimmen: until 1932 administered by Regierungsbezirk Stralsund, population 42,259 (1939)
  - Landkreis Naugard: population 52,777 (1900); 61,320 (1939)
  - Landkreis Pyritz: population 42,686 (1900); 48,418 (1939)
  - Landkreis Randow: population 94,859 (1900); partitioned in 1939 by Stadtkreis Stettin, Landkreis Greifenhagen, Landkreis Ueckermünde, and Landkreis Naugard
  - Landkreis Rügen (Capital: Bergen auf Rügen): until 1932 administered by Regierungsbezirk Stralsund, population 62,261 (1939)
  - Landkreis Regenwalde: population 44,954 (1900);
  - Landkreis Saatzig (Capital: Stargard (Pommern)): population 69,762 (1900); 43,258 (1939)
  - Landkreis Ueckermünde: population 56,767 (1900); 79,996 (1939)
  - Landkreis Usedom-Wollin (Capital: Swinemünde): population 52,193 (1900); 83,479 (1939)

=== Stralsund government region (Northwest) ===
Districts of the province of Pomerania (1913) with the Stralsund government region shown in Blue.

The Stralsund government region (Regierungsbezirk Stralsund) comprised the Western Pomeranian region of Neuvorpommern.

The reason for creating a Regierungsbezirk as small as Stralsund was that Neuvorpommern had a somewhat different history than the rest of Pomerania. This region, consisting of the island of Rügen and the adjacent mainland between the Recknitz and Peene rivers, made up the Rani and Danish Principality of Rugia in the Middle Ages. Although it was inherited by the Pomeranian dukes in 1325, the region was for some time governed as the splinter duchy of Pomerania-Barth. While a part of Swedish Pomerania, Denmark maintained her old claims and occupied the area in 1715 during the Great Northern War. Yet, the Danes were forced to return it to Sweden by the 1720 Treaty of Stockholm (Great Northern War). In the 1813 Treaty of Kiel, Denmark again gained nominal overlordship, yet was unable to pay her war reparations to Sweden and awarded her claim to Prussia in the 1815 Congress of Vienna along with her debts in exchange for the Duchy of Lauenburg.

The name New Western Pomerania (Neuvorpommern) stems from that era, to distinguish the Western Pomeranian areas south of the Peene River gained by Prussia in 1720 (Old Western Pomerania or Altvorpommern) from the northern regions gained in 1815 and to replace the outdated term Principality of Rügen.

When merged into the province in 1815, Neuvorpommern was guaranteed her constitution to be left in place. The administration was led by the former Swedish general governour, prince Malte von Putbus, until Regierungsbezirk Stralsund was officially created in 1818. Prussian law (Allgemeines Preußisches Landrecht and Preußisches Stadtrecht) was not enforced, and the Swedish jurisdiction with the court in Greifswald was left in place.

Regierungsbezirk Stralsund was fused into Regierungsbezirk Stettin in 1932.

==== Subdivisions ====
- urban districts (Stadtkreise):
  - Stralsund: split off Landkreis Franzburg-Barth in 1874, population 31,076 (1900)
  - Greifswald: split off Landkreis Greifswald in 1913
- rural districts (Landkreise):
  - Landkreis Franzburg-Barth: population 41,704 (1900)
  - Landkreis Greifswald: population 61,840 (1900)
  - Landkreis Grimmen: population 35,540 (1900)
  - Landkreis Rügen (capital Bergen auf Rügen): population 46,270 (1900)

=== Posen-West Prussia government region ===
Districts of the province of Pomerania (1939) with the Posen-West Prussia government region shown in Green.

The Posen-West Prussia government region (Regierungsbezirk Grenzmark Posen-Westpreußen) was created in 1938 from the northern part of the former Prussian province of Posen-West Prussia, known as the Schneidemühl government region (Regierungsbezirk Schneidemühl).

Following World War I, most of the Prussian provinces of Posen and West Prussia became part of the Second Polish Republic. The remainders of these provinces formed the province of Posen-West Prussia, combining small German-settled regions all along the new German-Polish border (Grenzmark meaning border march). In 1938, this province was dissolved and partitioned between Pomerania, Brandenburg and Silesia. The Pomeranian share was extended by the districts of Neustettin and Dramburg, formerly administered by Regierungsbezirk Köslin. The formerly Branderburgian districts of Arnswalde and Friedeberg were also incorporated into the Posen-West Prussia government region.

During World War II, it became a battlefield and was occupied by the Red Army in early 1945. Shortly thereafter, by the terms of the Potsdam Agreement, the Grenzmark, which was part of Polish Pomerania and Greater Poland before the Partitions of Poland, became again part of Poland and the remaining German population was expelled.

==== Subdivisions ====
- urban districts (Stadtkreise):
  - Schneidemühl
- rural districts (Landkreise):
  - Landkreis Arnswalde
  - Landkreis Deutsch Krone
  - Landkreis Dramburg
  - Landkreis Flatow
  - Landkreis Friedeberg Nm.
  - Netzekreis (capital: Schönlanke)
  - Landkreis Neustettin
  - Landkreis Schlochau

== Demographics ==
Mother tongues and religious confessions of Pomerania, 1905
- 1818: The province with an estimated area of 540 (Prussian) square miles had a population of 630,000. The Prussian state official ("Staatsminister") von Beyme stated in his report, that the province was in a "low state of population and culture".
- 1823: In 1823, Georg Hassel published the following data about the population of the province of Pomerania:

Ethnic structure (Nationalverschiedenheit) of the province of Pomerania in 1817–1819
Ethnic group	Population (number)	Population (percent)
Germans (Deutsche)	633,000	90.3%
Slavic Wends and Kashubians (Wenden und Kassuben)	65,000	9.3%
Jews (Juden)	2,976	0.4%
Total	700,766	100.0%

According to Georg Hassel, there were 65,000 Slavic-speakers in the whole Provinz Pommern in 1817–1819. Modern estimates for just eastern parts of Pommern in early 1800s range between 40,000 (Leszek Belzyt) and 25,000 (Jan Mordawski, Zygmunt Szultka). The number declined to between 35,000 and 23,000 (Zygmunt Szultka, Leszek Belzyt) in the years 1827–1831. In the 1850–1860s there were an estimated 23,000 to 17,000 Slavic-speakers left in Pommern, down to 15,000 in year 1892 according to Stefan Ramułt. The number was declining due to Germanisation. The bulk of Slavic population in 19th century Pommern was concentrated in its easternmost counties: especially Bytów (Bütow), Lębork (Lauenburg) and Słupsk (Stolp).

Until 1841, immigration to the province was higher than emigration. This trend reversed since 1850. However, the population grew further due to high birth rates.

- 1850: 1,255,900 inhabitants, predominantly Protestants, 11,100 Catholics, 9,700 Jews and 100 Mennonites.
- 1858: 1,125,000 people, 28% of whom lived in towns.
- 1871: 1,431,492 people, 68,7% of those lived in communities with less than 2,000 inhabitants.
- 1875: 1,445,852 people lived in the province, then with an area of 30,131 km^{2}. Of those, 685,147 lived in Regierungsbezirk Stettin, and 554,201 in Regierungsbezirk Köslin.
- 1890: 1,520,889 people, 62,3% of those lived in communities with less than 2,000 inhabitants, and 7,6% in Stettin. Among them were 1,476,300 Protestants, 27,476 Catholics, 4,587 persons belonging to other Christian religious groups, 200 dissidents and 12,246 Jews; 1,519,397 were citizens of the German Empire, 758 came from foreign territories attached to the empire, and 734 did not belong to any of these groups. With the exception of 10,666 persons composed of Poles, Kashubians and Masurians, all people of the Province used German as their native language. According to Stefan Ramułt the number of Slavic-speakers was higher, 15,000 just in the three easternmost counties of Stolp, Lauenburg and Bütow in year 1892.

Between 1871 and 1914, the prime characteristic of the province's demography was migration from the rural areas, first to urban centers (Landflucht), then to destinations in other German provinces and overseas (Ostflucht). Despite the emigration during this time span, the population increased by 300,000 people.

- Between 1871 and 1880, 61,700 people emigrated to America.
- Between 1881 and 1890, 132,100 people emigrated to America; 95,000 of these emigrated between 1881 and 1885.
- Between 1891 and 1900, 56,700 people emigrated to America.
- Between 1871 and 1895, 242,505 people emigrated from the province, primarily from 1880 to 1885 (95,000 emigrants).
- Between 1880 and 1910, 426,000 more people emigrated than immigrated. Emigrants came primarily from rural areas, which they left for economic reasons; prime destinations were Ruhr area and Berlin (Ostflucht).

Most people emigrated from Regierungsbezirk Köslin, where the population numbers of 1880 were only reached again in 1899.

The Province of Pomerania was one of the three provinces (the other two were West Prussia and Province of Posen) responsible for most of the German emigrants who went overseas. Imperial Commissioners for emigration ("Reichskommissar für Auswanderung") organized emigration from Hamburg, Bremen, Stettin, and Swinemünde. Emigration to overseas ended in 1893, when in America the free availability of soil claims ended.

- 1905: Of 1,684,326 inhabitants 1,616,550 were Protestants, 50,206 Roman Catholics and 9660 Jews, (1900) 14,162 Polish speakers (at the West Prussian border) and 310 Kashubian speakers (at the Lakes Lebasee and Gardescher See).
- 1907: 440,000 people born in the province lived in other areas of Germany.
- 1910: 1,716,921 inhabitants, 55,3% of those lived in communities with less than 2,000 inhabitants, and 13,7% in Stettin. Of those, the majority was Protestant (1,637,299; i.e. 95,36%), 56,298 were Roman Catholics (3,27%), less than one percent were Old Lutherans (primarily in the Cammin and Greifenberg counties), and 8862 were Jews (0,52%).

Polish seasonal workers were employed in Pomeranian agriculture since the 1890s, initially to replace the emigrants. In 1910, 7921 Poles lived steadily in the province. In 1912, 12,000 seasonal workers were employed in agriculture, in 1914 their number increased to 42,000.

- 1919: On October 8, 1919, the province had 1,787,179 inhabitants. This population had increased by 160,000 in 1925.

On October 1, 1938, the bulk of the former Province of Posen-West Prussia was merged into the province of Pomerania, adding an area of 5,787 km^{2} (2,234 sq mi) with a population of 251,000.

On October 15, Stettin's city limits were expanded to an area of 460 km^{2} (180 sq mi), housing 383,000 people.

During the Soviet conquest of Farther Pomerania and the subsequent expulsions of Germans until 1950, 498,000 people from the part of the province east of the Oder-Neisse line died, making up for 26,4% of the former population. Of the 498,000 dead, 375,000 were civilians, and 123,000 were Wehrmacht soldiers. Low estimates give a million expellees from the then Polish part of the province in 1945 and the following years. Only 7,100 km^{2} (2,700 sq mi) remained with Germany, about a fourth of the province's size before 1938 and a fifth of the size thereafter.

=== Modern inhabitants ===
During the Polish post-war census of December 1950, data about the pre-war places of residence of the inhabitants as of August 1939 was collected. In the case of children born between September 1939 and December 1950, their origin was reported based on the pre-war places of residence of their mothers. Thanks to this data it is possible to reconstruct the pre-war geographical origin of the post-war population. The same territory corresponding to 1939 Provinz Pommern east of the Oder-Neisse line (which became part of Poland in 1945) was inhabited as of December 1950 by:

1950 population by place of residence back in 1939:
Region (within 1939 borders):	Number	Percent
Autochthons (1939 DE/FCD citizens)	70,209	6.7%
Polish expellees from Kresy (USSR)	250,091	24.0%
Poles from abroad except the USSR	18,607	1.8%
Resettlers from the City of Warsaw	37,285	3.6%
From Warsaw region (Masovia)	73,936	7.1%
From Białystok region and Sudovia	16,081	1.5%
From pre-war Polish Pomerania	145,854	14.0%
Resettlers from Poznań region	81,215	7.8%
Katowice region (East Upper Silesia)	11,869	1.1%
Resettlers from the City of Łódź	8,344	0.8%
Resettlers from Łódź region	76,128	7.3%
Resettlers from Kielce region	78,340	7.5%
Resettlers from Lublin region	81,167	7.8%
Resettlers from Kraków region	18,237	1.7%
Resettlers from Rzeszów region	57,965	5.6%
place of residence in 1939 unknown	17,891	1.7%
Total pop. in December 1950	1,043,219	100.0%

Over 90% of the 1950 population were newcomers to the region, with less than 10% residing in German Province of Pomerania already back in August 1939 (so-called autochthons, who had German citizenship before World War II and were granted Polish citizenship after 1945). The largest group among new inhabitants were Poles expelled from areas of Eastern Poland annexed by the Soviet Union. The second largest group were newcomers from pre-war Polish part of historical Pomerania. The third-largest group were Poles from pre-war Poznań Voivodeship of Poland.

== See also ==
- List of towns in Western Pomerania
- List of towns in Farther Pomerania
