= List of placenames in the Province of Pomerania =

The name Pomerania comes from Slavic po more, which means Land at the Sea.

These lists are based on the information found in Amtliches Gemeindeverzeichnis für das Deutsche Reich auf Grund der Volkszählung 1939 and Ortsnamenverzeichnis der Ortschaften jenseits von Oder und Neiße

For a list of towns in the former Province of Pomerania, see

- List of towns in Vorpommern for all towns that since 1945 are west of the Oder-Neisse line
- List of towns in Farther Pomerania for all towns that since 1945 are east of the Oder-Neisse line

These lists include: name; county (Landkreis) in 1910; Regierungsbezirk (government region) in 1910; county (Landkreis) before 1945; county (Landkreis) before 1994; county (Landkreis) after 1994; town since (year); population in 1910; population in 2006; Polish name and administration if east of the Oder-Neisse line.

For all other municipalities, see List of municipalities in the Province of Pomerania for the full list.

The lists include: name; Kreis (county, before 1945); Gemeinde (German municipality) today; Amt (German district) today; Landkreis (German county) today; Polish name today (if east of the Oder-Neisse line); Gmina (Polish municipality, if east of the Oder-Neisse line) today; Powiat (Polish county, if east of the Oder-Neisse line) today.

== See also ==
- List of German exonyms for places in Poland
