= List of towns in Western Pomerania =

< List of placenames in the Province of Pomerania < List of towns in Vorpommern

The List of towns in Western Pomerania includes all towns in present-day German Pomerania, and thus excludes towns which lie west of the Oder river, but east of the Oder-Neisse line (Stettiner Zipfel area), and thus historically are associated also with Western Pomerania. For these towns, see List of towns in Farther Pomerania.

German Western Pomerania had a population of about 470,000 in 2012 (districts of Vorpommern-Rügen and Vorpommern-Greifswald combined) - while the Polish districts of the region had a population of about 520,000 in 2012 (cities of Stettin, Swinemünde and Police County combined). So overall, about 1 million people live in the historical region of Western Pomerania today, while the Stettin agglomeration reaches even further.

For a list of all urban municipalities in the modern German state, see List of cities in Mecklenburg-Vorpommern.

Name	District (Landkreis) in 1910	Regierungs-bezirk in 1910	District (Landkreis) before 1945	District (Landkreis) before 1994	District (Landkreis) after 1994	District (Landkreis) after 2011	Town since	Population, 1910	Population, 2006	Notes
Altentreptow	Demmin	Stettin	Demmin	Altentreptow (since 1952)	Demmin	Mecklenburgische Seenplatte	1245	4,493	6,153	before 1939: Treptow a./Tollense
Anklam	Anklam	Stettin	Anklam	Anklam	Ostvorpommern	Vorpommern-Greifswald	1264	15,279	14,092	
Barth	Franzburg	Stralsund	Franzburg-Barth	Stralsund	Nordvorpommern	Vorpommern-Rügen	1255	7,505	9,097	
Bergen auf Rügen	Rügen	Stralsund	Rügen	Rügen	Rügen	Vorpommern-Rügen	1613	4,156	14,430	
Demmin	Demmin	Stettin	Demmin	Demmin	Demmin	Mecklenburgische Seenplatte	~ 1249	12,378	12,633	
Eggesin	Ueckermünde	Stettin	-	Ueckermünde	Uecker-Randow	Vorpommern-Greifswald	1966	2,771	5,483	
Franzburg	Franzburg	Stralsund	Franzburg-Barth	Stralsund	Nordvorpommern	Vorpommern-Rügen	1587	1,526	1,592	
Gartz (Oder)	Randow	Stettin	Randow	Angermünde	Uckermark	Vorpommern-Greifswald	1249	3,750	2,521	
Garz/Rügen	Rügen	Stralsund	Rügen	Rügen	Rügen	Vorpommern-Rügen	1319	1,960	2,567	
Greifswald	Greifswald	Stralsund	-	-	kreisfrei	Vorpommern-Greifswald	1249	24,679	53,434	own county since 1912
Grimmen	Grimmen	Stralsund	Grimmen	Grimmen	Nordvorpommern	Vorpommern-Rügen	before 1287	4,037	11,032	
Gützkow	Greifswald	Stralsund	Greifswald	Greifswald	Ostvorpommern	Vorpommern-Greifswald	1353	1,969	2,776	
Jarmen	Demmin	Stettin	Demmin	Demmin	Demmin	Vorpommern-Greifswald	1290	3,246	3,418	
Lassan	Greifswald	Stralsund	Anklam	Anklam	Ostvorpommern	Vorpommern-Greifswald	1291	2,110	1,392	
Loitz	Grimmen	Stralsund	Demmin	Demmin (ab 1952)	Demmin	Vorpommern-Greifswald	1242	3,846	4,524	
Pasewalk	Randow	Stettin	Randow	Pasewalk (since 1950)	Uecker-Randow	Vorpommern-Greifswald	1276	10,196	11,856	
Penkun	Randow	Stettin	Randow	Pasewalk (since 1950)	Uecker-Randow	Vorpommern-Greifswald	1284	1,704	2,065	
Putbus	Rügen	Stralsund	Rügen	Rügen	Rügen	Vorpommern-Rügen	1960	1,960	4,768	
Ribnitz-Damgarten	Franzburg	Stralsund	Franzburg-Barth	Ribnitz-Damgarten	Nordvorpommern	Vorpommern-Rügen	1258	1,646	2,300	Pomeranian Damgarten in 1950 merged to Mecklenburgian Ribnitz
Richtenberg	Franzburg	Stralsund	Franzburg-Barth	Stralsund	Nordvorpommern	Vorpommern-Rügen	1297	1,696	1,453	
Sassnitz	Rügen	Stralsund	Rügen	Rügen	Rügen	Vorpommern-Rügen	1957	2,841	10,747	before 1993 spelled Saßnitz
Stralsund	Stadtkreis	Stralsund	-	-	kreisfrei	Vorpommern-Rügen	1234	33,988	58,288	
Torgelow	Ueckermünde	Stettin	-	Ueckermünde	Uecker-Randow	Vorpommern-Greifswald	1945	6,747	10,032	
Tribsees	Grimmen	Stralsund	-	Grimmen	Nordvorpommern	Vorpommern-Rügen	1267	3,394	2,878	
Ueckermünde	Ueckermünde	Stettin	-	Ueckermünde	Uecker-Randow	Vorpommern-Greifswald	1260	6,252	10,399	
Usedom	Usedom-Wollin	Stettin	Usedom	Wolgast	Ostvorpommern	Vorpommern-Greifswald	1299	1,773	1,892	
Wolgast	Greifswald	Stralsund	-	Wolgast	Ostvorpommern	Vorpommern-Greifswald	1259	8,211	12,359	
