= Stralsund (region) =

Region in the Province of Pomerania (1818–1932)

The Region of Stralsund (German: Regierungsbezirk Stralsund, i.e. "government region of Stralsund") belonged to the Prussian Province of Pomerania and existed from 1818 to 1932.

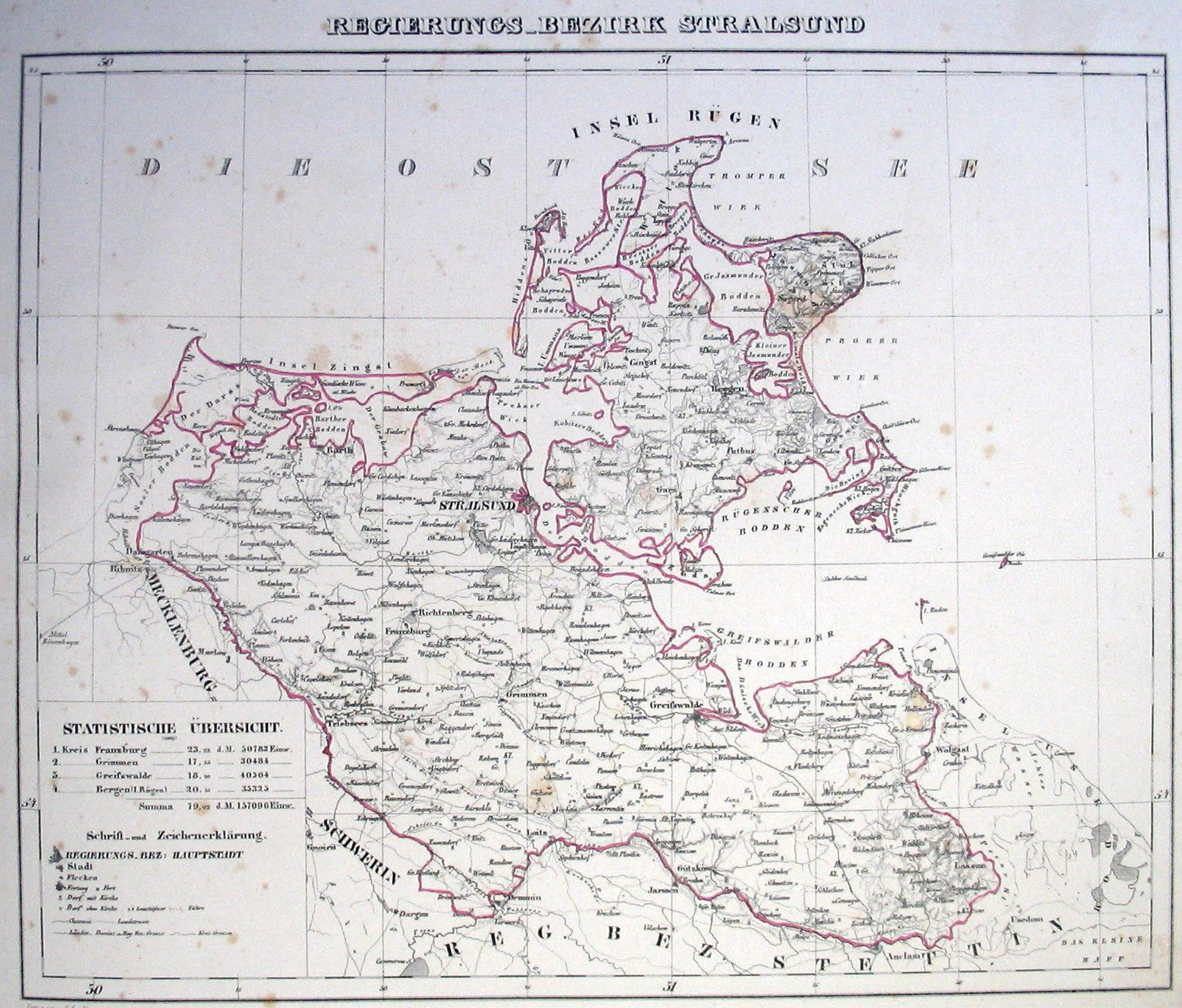

== History ==
The Regierungsbezirk of Stralsund was formed in 1818 as one of three Pomeranian government districts. It covered Swedish Pomerania (New Hither Pomerania [aka New Western Pomerania] and Rügen) which had fallen to Prussia in 1815. The special legal position of this territory was the reason for the creation of what was then the smallest government region in the whole of Prussia. Unlike the rest of the Province of Pomerania, neither General Prussian State Law nor the laws and ordinances of the so-called Stein-Hardenberg reforms (such as the Local Government Act of 1808), as they were called at the time, applied here. An alignment of the legal position was only gradually achieved in the second half of the 19th century, and was largely completed on the introduction of the Civil Code (BGB) in January 1900. But in some areas, special legal forms continued to exist, a situation that was unlike anywhere else in Prussia and Germany and which even went back to the time of Swedish rule, for example, the so-called Tertialrecht. As a result, the Wismar Tribunal of Appeal, which moved from Wismar via Stralsund to Greifswald in 1802/03, still operated under this name when seated in Greifswald and continued as the final arbiter of proper jurisdiction for the region until 1848.

The first regional government was inaugurated on 5 January 1818 by the upper president of the Province of Pomerania, Johann August Sack, in his office. This followed several years of discussion about the status of the region. That produced three options:

1. Form a separate province of New Hither Pomerania and Rügen
2. Form a separate government region within the Province of Pomerania
3. Immediately integrate it into the existing Region of Stettin

An appeal by the districts and towns to the king against the formation of the government region was dismissed. However, the Prussian system of taxation was only introduced in New Hither Pomerania following a royal cabinet order of 19 November 1821.

Because of its small size the Region of Stralsund was one of those Prussian government regions which was up for re-negotiation from the outset. Only a few years after its formation there were further discussions about its future. In the end it was its aforementioned special legal status that prevented its dissolution time and again. Not until 1 October 1932 was it merged in the Stettin Region.

== Administrative divisions in the mid-19th century ==
The Stralsund government region is divided into four counties, three of which take their name from the towns in which the district councils are located. The fourth, however, takes its name after the island of Rügen, of which it is composed alone. New Hither Pomerania has three districts: Franzburg, Greifswald, Grimmen. Rügen forms the district of Rügen.

In ecclesiastical terms the government region is divided into eleven superintendencies, of which three cover the Franzburg district, two the Grimmen district, three the Greifswald district and three the island of Rügen.

All parishes are Protestant. Only in Stralsund is there a Catholic church, to which all Catholics in the government region belong.

== Population growth in the 19th century ==
- 1805: 118,112
- 1825: 142,312
- 1840: 169,114
- 1849: 185,426
- 1861: 208,429
- 1871: 208,276
- 1880: 216,130

== Districts in 1900 ==
In 1900 the Region of Stralsund comprised one urban (Stadtkreis) and four rural districts (Kreise). It covered an area of 4,010.88 km^{2}, on which there were 873 towns and villages and in which 216,340 inhabitants lived.

- Stadtkreis:
  - Stralsund (from 1873): 31,076 inhabitants
- Kreise:
  - Franzburg: 41,704 inhabitants
  - Greifswald: 61,840 inhabitants
  - Grimmen: 35,540 inhabitants
  - Rügen (seat: Bergen on Rügen): 46,270 inhabitants

== Districts in 1925 ==
In 1925 the population of the Region of Stralsund was 246,941.

- Stadtkreise:
  - Stralsund: 39,469
  - Greifswald (from 1912): 27,622
- Kreise:
  - Franzburg: 45,721
  - Greifswald: 40,085
  - Grimmen: 40,150
  - Rügen: 53,894

In 1925 the seat of the council for the Franzburg district was moved to Barth. From 1 February 1928 the district was officially renamed "Franzburg-Barth". In 1939 all rural districts in Germany were uniformly termed as Landkreis (i.e. rural district), whereas before in Prussia the term Kreis prevailed. However, this played no role for the Stralsund Region which was already absorbed in 1932.

== Regional presidents (Regierungspräsidenten) ==
- 1818–1825: Heinrich Christian Friedrich von Pachelbel-Gehag
- 1825–1833: Leopold von Rohr
- 1833–1834: Adolf Heinrich von Arnim-Boitzenburg
- 1834–1848: Friedrich Ferdinand Leopold von Seydewitz
- 1848–1851: Busso Heinrich Christoph von Wedell-Piesdorf
- 1852–1869: Carl Reinhold von Krassow
- 1869–1883: Ulrich von Behr-Negendank
- 1884–1888: Albert Reinhold von Pommer-Esche
- 1888–1899: Carl Friedrich Heinrich von Arnim
- 1899–1908: Georg Scheller
- 1908–1917: Paul Wilhelm Adolf Blomeyer
- 1917–1919: Stephan von Gröning
- 1919–1932: Hermann Haußmann (DDP)

== Post-1945 ==
In 1946, Stralsund became the seat of the virtually unchanged district of Franzburg-Barth which was renamed on this occasion as rural district of Stralsund. In 1952 on the occasion of redistricting East Germany into new administrative units the eastern part of the Franzburg-Barth became the new and smaller District of Stralsund within the likewise new Region (Bezirk) of Rostock of the GDR. The western part went to the newly formed district of Ribnitz-Damgarten. The old district of Grimmen lost its southern part around Loitz in 1952, which went to the district of Demmin in the new Region of Neubrandenburg, as did the southern part of the old district of Greifswald which went to the new district of Anklam and thus also to the Neubrandenburg Region. In 1952 the eastern part of the old district of Greifswald around Wolgast formed the new district of Wolgast along with that part of the island of Usedom that remained within East Germany post-1945. The district of Rügen was divided in 1952 into the district of Bergen on Rügen and Putbus, but they were merged again already in 1955. While Stralsund city maintained its independence as urban district through these changes, Greifswald was meanwhile integrated into the district of Greifswald until the 1970s.

In 1994, the districts of Grimmen, Ribnitz-Damgarten and Stralsund, now in the state of Mecklenburg-Vorpommern (aka Mecklenburg-Hither Pomerania), were merged into the new district of Northern Hither Pomerania, whilst the districts of Anklam, Greifswald and Wolgast joined Eastern Hither Pomerania. Rügen remained unchanged, Greifswald and Stralsund also retained their independence.

As part of the planned local government reform, from 2011 the districts of Rügen and Northern Hither Pomerania, and the town of Stralsund formed a reshaped district of Northern Hither Pomerania, and the districts of Uecker-Randow, together with the town of Greifswald and parts of the district of Demmin, became Hither Pomerania-Greifswald.

== Literature ==
- Joachim Wächter: Die Bildung des Regierungsbezirkes Stralsund. In: Greifswald-Stralsunder Jahrbuch. Bd. 10 (1972/73), S. 127–137.
- Landeszentrale für politische Bildung des Landes Mecklenburg-Vorpommern (Hrsg): Historisch und geographischer Atlas von Mecklenburg und Pommern. Bd. 2: Mecklenburg und Pommern: Das Land im Rückblick. Karte 18, o. O. u. J. [Schwerin, 1996], S. 80–81.
- Johannes Hinz: Pommern. Lexikon, Würzburg 2001.

== Statistical reference books (State handbooks) ==
- Staats-Kalender für Pommern und Rügen, Stralsund 1808–1816.
- Staatskalender für Neu-Vorpommern und Rügen, Stralsund 1817–1820.
- Provinzial-Kalender für Neu-Vorpommern und das Fürstenthum Rügen, Stralsund 1821–1873.
- Provinzial-Handbuch für Neu-Vorpommern und das Fürstenthum Rügen, Stralsund 1874–1879.
- Handbuch für Neu-Vorpommern und das Fürstenthum Rügen, Stralsund 1883–1907.
