= Köslin (region) =

Regierungsbezirk in the Prussian Province of Pomerania

Districts of the Province of Pomerania (1939). Köslin Region is in pink.

The Region of Köslin was a Regierungsbezirk in the Prussian Province of Pomerania that existed from 1816 to 1945. The seat of government was located in the town of Köslin (Koszalin).

Since World War II the area has been part of Poland, since 1999 divided between the West Pomeranian Voivodeship and the Pomeranian Voivodeship.
