= Kolberg-Körlin District =

Coordinates: 54°11′00″N 15°35′00″E

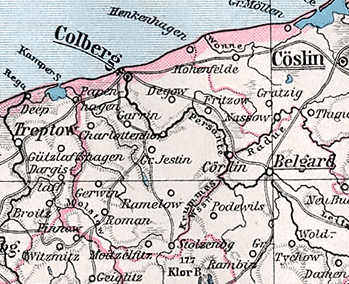
Contemporary map of Kolberg-Körlin.

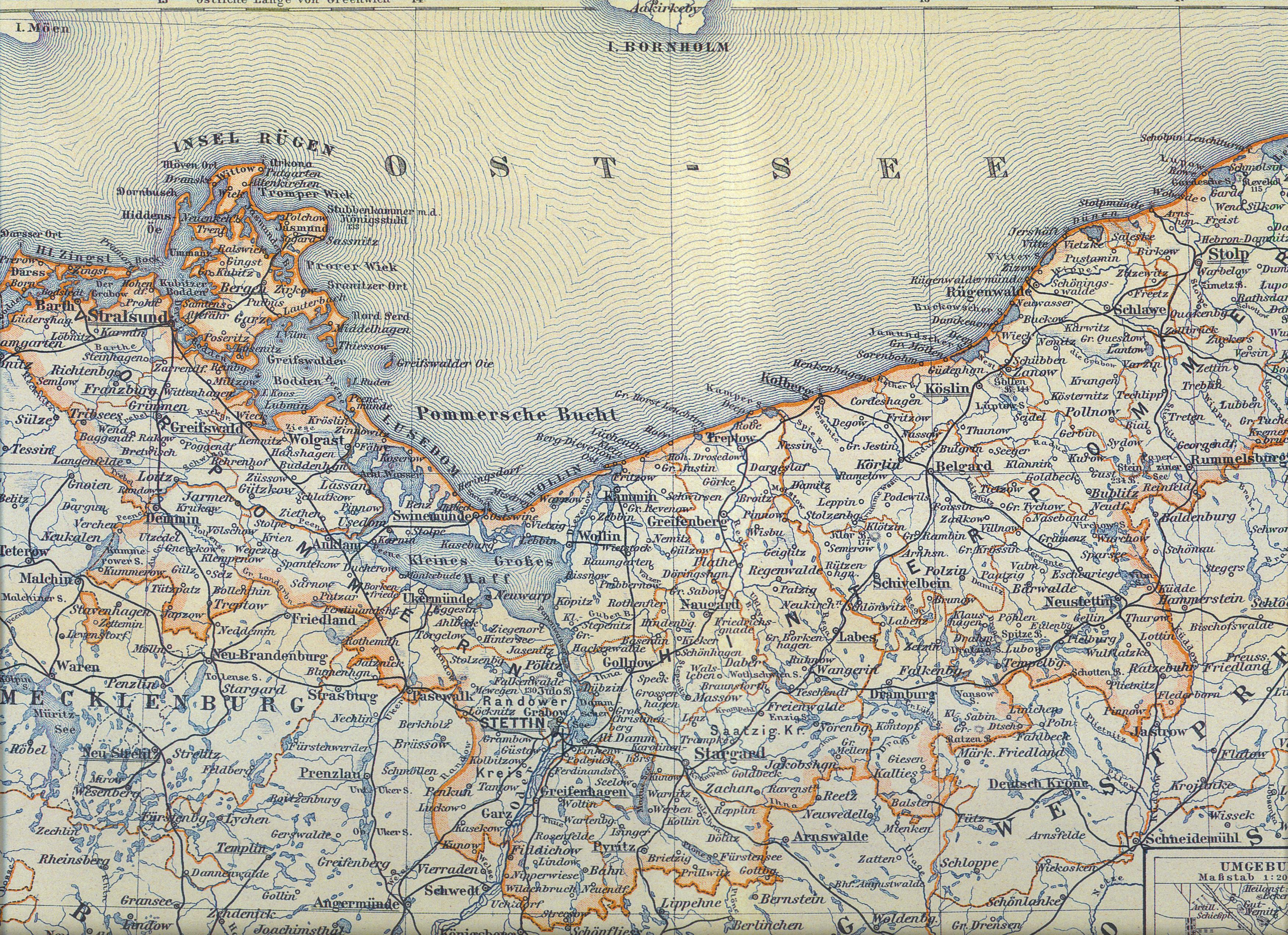
Province of Pomerania, 1892.

Kolberg-Körlin (earlier spelling Colberg-Cörlin) was a Landkreis (county) in the Prussian Province of Pomerania between 1872 and 1945. Its territory roughly corresponds with modern Kołobrzeg County (Polish: Powiat Kołobrzeski) and the western parts of modern Białogard County (Polish: Powiat Białogardzki) with Karlino, the former Körlin.

== History ==
Kolberg-Körlin comprised the village of Altstadt (now Budzistowo), a predecessor of nearby Kolberg founded before 1000 A.D. Other early settlements in the region are Pobloth and Zwilipp, both of which are first mentioned in 1159 according to the Pomeranian Urkundenbuch, and the localities Drosedow, Jarchow and Rützow, first mentioned in 1180 by the same source. Most of Kolberg–Körlin’s other municipalities have records dating back to the 13th Century.

Colberg-Cörlin was created on 1 September 1872 as a partition of Kreis Fürstenthum, the successor of the Principality of Cammin. It belonged to the government region (Regierungsbezirk) Cöslin (later Köslin) in the Prussian province of Pomerania, and comprised rural regions as well as the towns of Colberg and Cörlin. The county seat was in Colberg.

Following World War I, Colberg-Cörlin was renamed Kolberg-Körlin.

After Prussia was effectively absorbed into the Third Reich, Prussia and its districts, like all other German states under Hitler, was stripped of all genuine powers and were reduced to mere administrative units.

In early 1945 at the end of World War II, Kolberg-Körlin was occupied by the Red Army. Shortly thereafter, as a result of the Potsdam Agreement, Kolberg-Körlin, along with the rest of the former Prussian lands east of the Oder-Neisse line, became Polish. Most of the German population was evacuated or expelled and the area was resettled by Poles.

The territory of former Kolberg-Körlin subsequently became part of the Sczcecin, Koszalin and West Pomeranian Voivodeships.

== Demographics ==
The district had majority German population, with a small Polish (Kashubian) minority.

Ethnolinguistic structure of the district
	1890		1905	
German	51,762	99.1%	60,387	98.5%
Kashubian	417	0.8%	788	1.3%
Bilingual	36	0.1%	57	0.1%
Total	52,234		61,289	

== Municipalities ==
On 1 January 1945 the Landkries Kolberg-Körlin comprised the town of Körlin, with approximately 3,400 residents, and about 78 other communities with less than 2,000 inhabitants. In 1900, the county comprised the following municipalities and population:

- Alt Bork 381
- Alt Marrin, Gutsbezirk 316
- Alt Quetzin 411
- Alt Tramm 443
- Alt Werder 280
- Altstadt 25
- Altstadt, Gutsbezirk 115
- Baldekow 158
- Baldekow, Gutsbezirk 155
- Bartin 267
- Bodenhagen 512
- Bogenthin 188
- Bullenwinkel 148
- Büssow 307
- Damgardt 307
- Damitz 409
- Dassow 451
- Degow 1.073
- Drenow 433
- Drenow, Gutsbezirk 201
- Drosedow 337
- Drosedow, Gutsbezirk 326
- Dumzin, Gutsbezirk 224
- Eickstedtswalde, Gutsbezirk 136
- Fritzow 205
- Fritzow, Gutsbezirk 208
- Gandelin 95
- Gandelin, Gutsbezirk 252
- Ganzkow 49
- Ganzkow, Gutsbezirk 163
- Garchen 199
- Garrin 939
- Gervin 564
- Grandhof, Gutsbezirk 64
- Gribow 474
- Groß Jestin 1.618
- Groß Pobloth 37
- Groß Pobloth, Gutsbezirk 206
- Groß Vorbeck, Gutsbezirk 96
- Hohenfier, Gutsbezirk 77
- Jaasde 35
- Jarchow, Gutsbezirk 205
- Karkow, Gutsbezirk 162
- Karvin 329
- Kerstin 99
- Kerstin, Gutsbezirk 262
- Kienow, Gutsbezirk 110
- Klaptow, Gutsbezirk 332
- Klein Jestin 72
- Klein Jestin, Gutsbezirk 109
- Klein Pobloth, Gutsbezirk 259
- Kolberg 24.786
- Kolberger Deep 237
- Kölpin 331
- Kölpin A, Gutsbezirk 97
- Kölpin B, Gutsbezirk 65
- Körlin 2.998
- Körlin, Gutsbezirk 102
- Koseeger, Gutsbezirk 252
- Kowanz 445
- Kruckenbeck, Gutsbezirk 225
- Krühne, Gutsbezirk 83
- Leikow 123
- Leppin, Gutsbezirk 136
- Lestin, Gutsbezirk 494
- Lübchow 112
- Lübchow, Gutsbezirk 204
- Lustebuhr, Gutsbezirk 237
- Mallnow 106
- Mallnow, Gutsbezirk 132
- Mechenthin 65
- Mechenthin, Gutsbezirk 105
- Meierei, Gutsbezirk 157
- Mohrow 173
- Moitzelfitz 140
- Moitzelfitz, Gutsbezirk 282
- Moitzlin, Gutsbezirk 195
- Moltow, Gutsbezirk 180
- Mühlenbruch, Gutsbezirk 30
- Naugard 176
- Necknin 186
- Nehmer 388
- Nessin 365
- Neu Bork 147
- Neugasthof, Gutsbezirk 105
- Neu Marrin, Gutsbezirk 71
- Neu Quetzin 141
- Neu Sternin 413
- Neu Tramm 159
- Neu Werder 114
- Neurese 347
- Papenhagen, Gutsbezirk 64
- Peterfitz 218
- Peterfitz, Gutsbezirk 70
- Petersfelde, Gutsbezirk 152
- Petershagen 636
- Plauenthin, Gutsbezirk 169
- Poldemin 169
- Prettmin 349
- Pustar, Gutsbezirk 204
- Putzernin, Gutsbezirk 101
- Rabuhn 401
- Rabuhn, Gutsbezirk 10)
- Ramelow 204
- Ramelow, Niedergut, Gutsbezirk 171
- Ramelow, Obergut, Gutsbezirk 188
- Reselkow 471
- Reselkow, Gutsbezirk 99
- Rogzow 48
- Rogzow, Gutsbezirk 335
- Roman 403
- Roman, Gutsbezirk 277
- Rossenthin 210
- Rützow, Gutsbezirk 476
- Rüwolsdorf 187
- Schleps 269
- Schmuckenthin, Gutsbezirk 124
- Schötzow 72
- Schötzow, Gutsbezirk 192
- Schwartow, Gutsbezirk 153
- Schwedt 513
- Schwedt, Gutsbezirk 14)
- Seefeld 278
- Sellnow 517
- Semmerow 269
- Simötzel 910
- Sophienwalde, Gutsbezirk 21
- Spie 257
- Sternin 134
- Stöckow 379
- Stolzenberg 979
- Trienke, Gutsbezirk 314
- Wartekow 96
- Wartekow, Gutsbezirk 151
- Wobrow 153
- Zernin 637
- Zürkow, Gutsbezirk 114
- Zwilipp 283

== See also ==
- Goscino
- History of Prussia
- Pomerania
- Prussia
- West Pomeranian Voivodeship
