= Szadzko =

Village in West Pomeranian Voivodeship, Poland

- Village
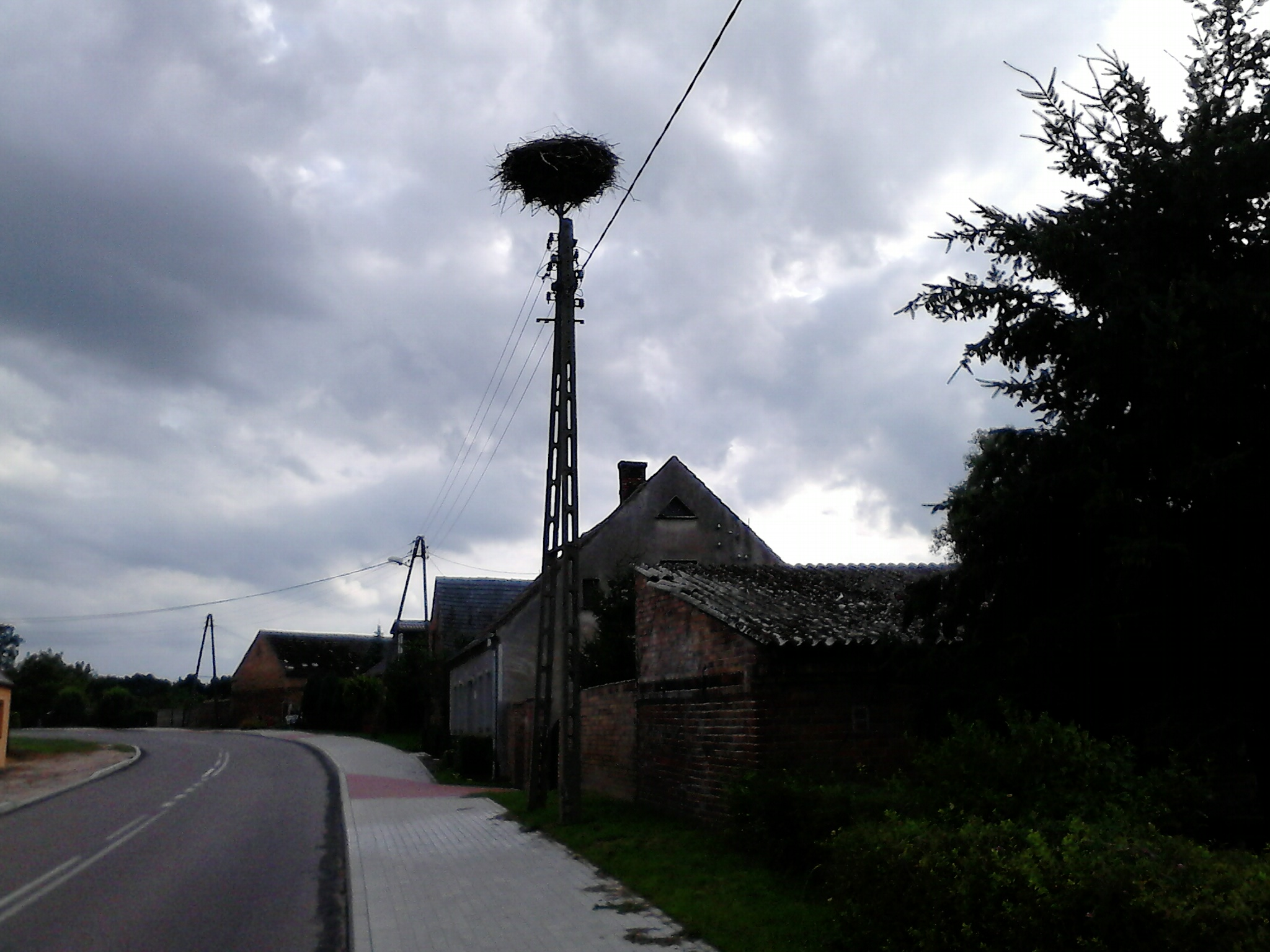

- Location within Poland
- Coordinates: 53°20′30″N 15°23′49″E
- Country: Poland
- Voivodeship: West Pomeranian
- County: Stargard
- Gmina: Dobrzany
- Time zone: UTC+1 (CET)
  - Summer (DST): UTC+2 (CEST)
- Vehicle registration: ZST

Szadzko [ˈʂat͡skɔ] (German: Saatzig) is a village in the administrative district of Gmina Dobrzany, within Stargard County, West Pomeranian Voivodeship, in north-western Poland. It lies approximately 2 miles (3 km) south-west of Dobrzany, 16 mi (26 km) east of Stargard, and 34 mi (55 km) east of the regional capital Szczecin.

During World War II, the German administration operated a forced labour subcamp of the Stalag II-D prisoner-of-war camp in the village.

== Notable people ==
- Hans-Wilhelm Koepcke (1914–2000), German zoologist, ornithologist and herpetologist
