= History of Pomerania (1933–1945) =

History of Pomerania between 1933 and 1945 covers the period of one decade of the long history of Pomerania, lasting from the Adolf Hitler's rise to power until the end of World War II in Europe. In 1933, the German Province of Pomerania like all of Germany came under control of the Nazi regime. During the following years, the Nazis led by Gauleiter Franz Schwede-Coburg consolidated their power through the process known as Gleichschaltung and repressed their opponents. Meanwhile, the Pomeranian Voivodeship was part of the Second Polish Republic, led by Józef Piłsudski. With respect to Polish Pomerania, Nazi diplomacy – as part of their initial attempts to subordinate Poland into Anti-Comintern Pact – aimed at incorporation of the Free City of Danzig into the Third Reich and an extra-territorial transit route through Polish territory, which was rejected by the Polish government, that feared economic blackmail by Nazi Germany, and reduction to puppet status.

== Background ==
The name Pomerania comes from Slavic po more, which means Land at the Sea.

In 1939, the German Wehrmacht invaded Poland, engaging in a series of massacres against the civilian population, the most notable being the mass murders in Piaśnica. Polish Pomerania with a part of Kashubia was incorporated into Reichsgau Danzig-West Prussia.The German state set up concentration camps, expelled Poles and Jews, and systematically engaged in genocide of people they regar ded as Untermensch (primarily Jews, Poles and Roma).

Albert Forster, Gauleiter and Reichsstatthalter of Danzig-West Prussia, was directly responsible for the extermination of non-Germans in the region. He personally believed in the need to engage in genocide of Poles and stated that "We have to exterminate this nation, starting from the cradle" and declared that Poles and Jews were not human. In 1945, Pomerania was taken by the Red Army during the East Pomeranian Offensive and the Battle of Berlin. Along with the Soviet offensive, atrocities against the German civilian population occurred on a large scale.

== Pomerania and the National Socialists ==
=== Pomeranian Voivodeship ===
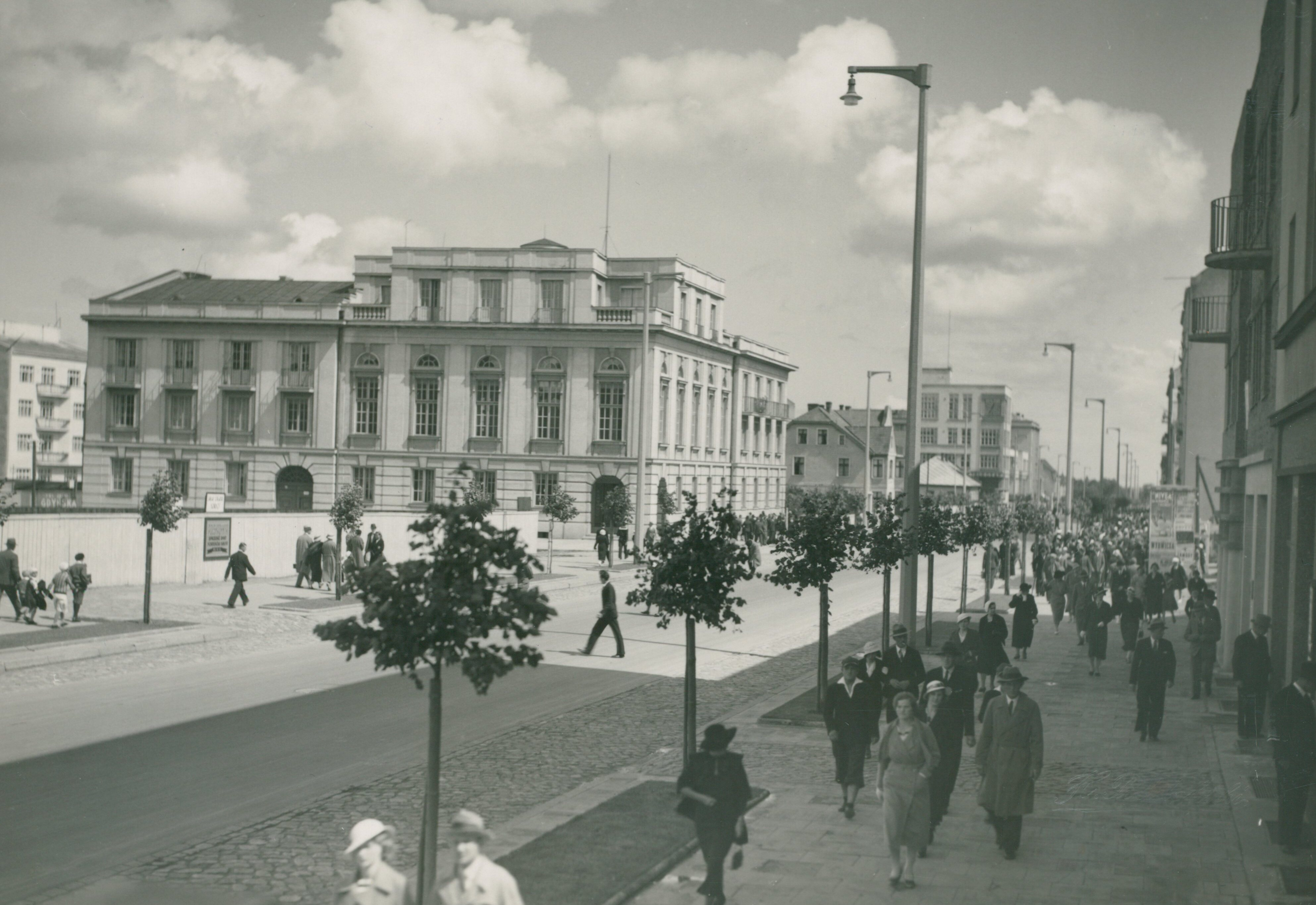
Gdynia, Poland in 1934

The totalitarian and anti-Polish Nazi Party, led by Adolf Hitler, took power in Germany in 1933. By this time, the Second Polish Republic was led by Józef Piłsudski who ruled the country as an authoritarian democracy. Hitler at first ostentatiously pursued a policy of rapprochement with Poland, culminating in the ten year Polish-German Non-Aggression Pact of 1934. In the coming years, Germany placed an emphasis on rearmament, to which Poland and other European powers reacted. Initially Nazis were able to achieve their immediate goals of territorial expansion without provoking armed resistance; in 1938 Nazi Germany annexed Austria and the Sudetenland after the Munich Agreement. In October 1938, Germany tried to get Poland to join the Anti-Comintern Pact. Poland refused, as the alliance was quickly becoming a sphere of influence for an increasingly powerful Germany.

Following negotiations with Hitler for the Munich Agreement, British Prime Minister Neville Chamberlain reported that, "He told me privately, and last night he repeated publicly, that after this Sudeten German question is settled, that is the end of Germany's territorial claims in Europe". Almost immediately following the agreement, however, Hitler reneged. The Nazis increased their requests for the incorporation of the Free City of Danzig into the Reich, citing the "protection" of the German majority as a motive. In November 1938, Danzig's district administrator, Albert Forster reported to the League of Nations that Hitler had told him Polish frontiers would be guaranteed if the Poles were "reasonable like the Czechs." German State Secretary Ernst von Weizsäcker reaffirmed this alleged guarantee in December 1938.

The situation regarding the Free City of Danzig and the Polish Corridor created a number of headaches for German and Polish customs. The Germans requested the Free City of Danzig and the construction of an extra-territorial highway (to complete the Reichsautobahn Berlin-Königsberg) and railway through the Polish Corridor, connecting East Prussia to Danzig and Germany proper. Poland agreed on building a German highway and to allow German railway traffic, in return they would extend the non-aggression pact for 25 years.

This seemed to conflict with Hitler's plans and with Poland's rejection of the Anti-Comintern Pact, his desire to either isolate or gain support against the Soviet Union. German newspapers in Danzig and Nazi Germany played an important role inciting nationalist sentiment; headlines buzzed about how Poland was misusing its economic rights in Danzig and German Danzigers were increasingly subjugated to the will of the Polish state. At the same time, Hitler also offered Poland additional territory as an enticement, such as the possible annexation of Lithuania, the Klaipėda Region, Soviet Ukraine and Czech inhabited lands. However, Polish leaders continued to fear for the loss of their independence and a shared fate with Czechoslovakia, although they had also taken part in its partitioning. Some felt that the Danzig question was inextricably tied to the problems in the Polish Corridor and any settlement regarding Danzig would be one step towards the eventual loss of Poland's access to the sea. Nevertheless, Hitler's credibility outside of Germany was very low after the occupation of Czechoslovakia.

Hitler used the issue of the status of Danzig as pretext for attacking Poland, while explaining during a high-level meeting of German military officials in May 1939 that his real goal is obtaining Lebensraum for Germany, isolating Poles from their Allies in the West and afterwards attacking Poland, thus avoiding the repeat of the Czech situation.

In 1939, Nazi Germany made another proposal regarding Danzig; the city was to be incorporated into the Reich while the Polish section of the population was to be "evacuated" and resettled elsewhere. Poland was to retain a permanent right to use the seaport and the route through the Polish Corridor was to be constructed. However, the Poles distrusted Hitler and saw the plan as a threat to Polish sovereignty, practically subordinating Poland to the Axis and the Anti-Comintern Bloc while reducing the country to a state of near-servitude. Writing about the Danzig crisis on 30 April 1939, Robert Coulondre, the French ambassador in Berlin sent a dispatch to Foreign Minister Georges Bonnet saying Hitler wanted:"...a mortgage on Polish foreign policy, while itself retaining complete liberty of action allowing the conclusion of political agreements with other countries. In these circumstances, the new settlement proposed by Germany, which would link the questions of Danzig and of the passage across the Corridor with counterbalancing questions of a political nature, would only serve to aggravate this mortgage and practically subordinate Poland to the Axis and the Anti-Comintern Bloc. Warsaw refused this in order to retain its independence....Polish acceptance of Germany's demands would have rendered the application of any braking machinery in the East impossible. The Germans are not wrong then, when they claim that Danzig is in itself only a secondary question. It is not only the fate of the Free City, it is the enslavement or liberty of Europe which is at stake in the issue now joined." Additionally, Poland was backed by guarantees of support from both the United Kingdom and France in regard to Danzig.

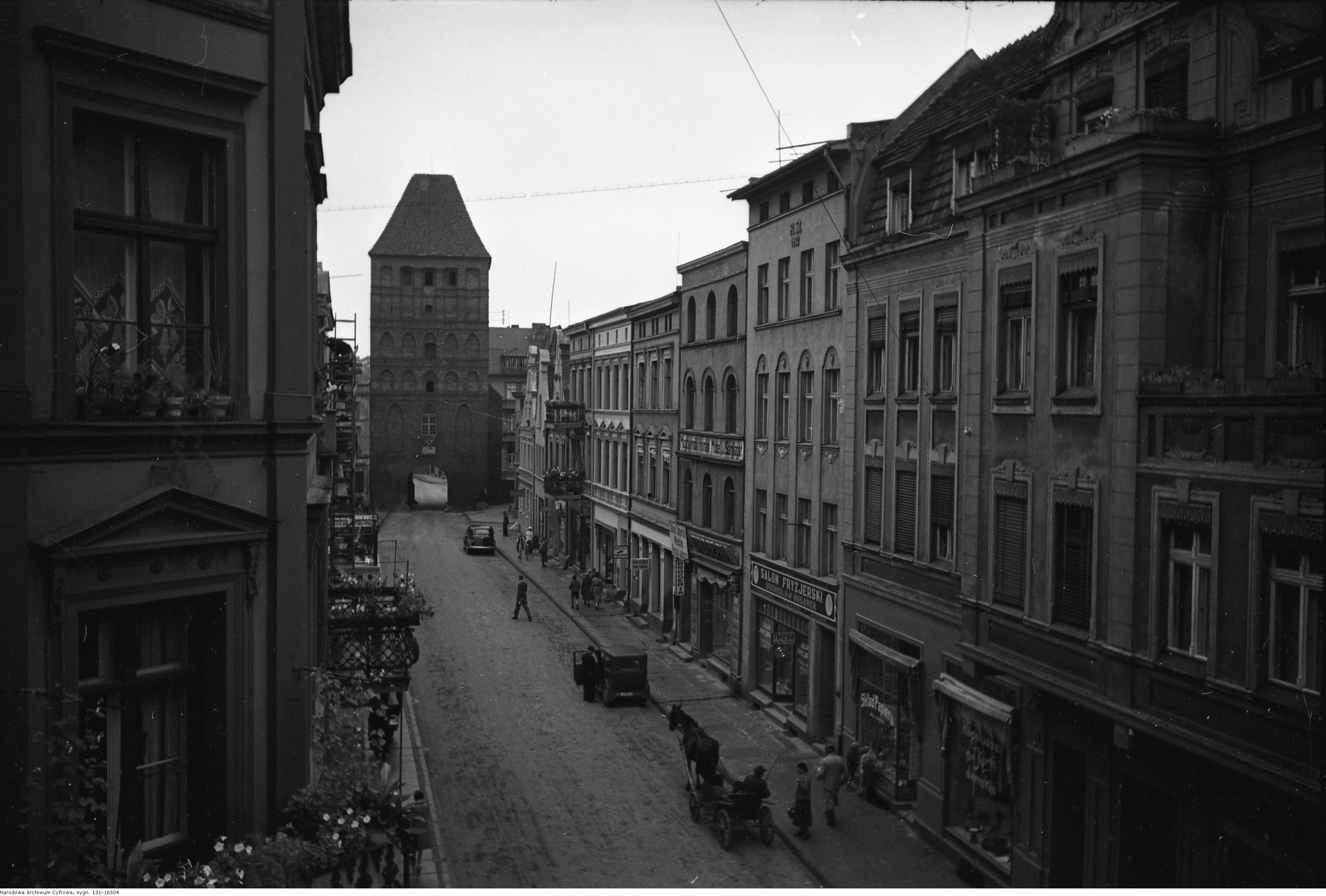
Chojnice, Poland in 1938

A revised and less favorable proposal came in the form of an ultimatum made by the Nazis in late August, after the orders had already been given to attack Poland on September 1, 1939. Nevertheless, at midnight on August 29, Joachim von Ribbentrop handed British Ambassador Sir Neville Henderson a list of terms which would allegedly ensure peace in regard to Poland. Danzig was to be incorporated into Germany and there was to be a plebiscite in the Polish Corridor; all Poles who were born or settled there since 1919 would have no vote, while all Germans born but not living there would. An exchange of minority populations between the two countries was proposed. If Poland accepted these terms, Germany would agree to the British offer of an international guarantee, which would include the Soviet Union. A Polish plenipotentiary, with full powers, was to arrive in Berlin and accept these terms by noon the next day. The British Cabinet viewed the terms as "reasonable," except the demand for a Polish Plenipotentiary, which was seen as similar to Czechoslovak President Emil Hácha accepting Hitler's terms in mid-March 1939.

When Ambassador Józef Lipski went to see Ribbentrop on August 30, he was presented with Hitler's demands. However, he did not have the full power to sign and Ribbentrop ended the meeting. News was then broadcast that Poland had rejected Germany's offer.

=== Free City of Danzig ===
In May 1933, the Nazi Party won the local elections in the city. However, they received 57 percent of the vote, less than the two-thirds required by the League of Nations to change the constitution of the Free City of Danzig. The government introduced antisemitic and anti-Catholic laws, the latter primarily being directed against the Polish and Kashubian inhabitants. In the 1930s, the rights of local Poles were commonly violated and limited by the local administration. Polish children were refused admission to public Polish-language schools, premises were not allowed to be rented to Polish schools and preschools. In 1937, Poles who sent their children to private Polish schools were demanded to transfer children to German schools, under threat of police intervention, and attacks were carried out on Polish schools and Polish youth.

German militias carried out numerous beatings of Polish activists, scouts, and even mailmen, as "punishment" for distributing the Polish press. German students attacked and expelled Polish students from the technical university. Dozens of Polish surnames were forcibly Germanized, while Polish symbols that reminded that for centuries the city was part of Poland were removed from landmarks, such as the Artus Court and the Neptune's Fountain.

From 1937, the employment of Poles by German companies was prohibited, and already employed Poles were fired, the use of Polish in public places was banned and Poles were not allowed to enter several restaurants, in particular those owned by Germans. In 1938, the Germans committed over 100 attacks on Polish homes on the day of the Polish 3 May Constitution Day. In 1939, before the German invasion of Poland and outbreak of World War II, local Polish railwaymen were victims of beatings and arrests.

The city also served as a training point for members of the German minority within Poland that, recruited by organisations such as the Jungdeutsche Partei ("Young German Party") and the Deutsche Vereinigung ("German Union"), would form the leading cadres of Selbstschutz, an organisation involved with murder and atrocities during the German invasion of Poland in 1939. Jews were also increasingly persecuted; the Danzig Great Synagogue was taken over and demolished by the local authorities in 1939.

=== Province of Pomerania ===
==== Pomeranian Nazi movement before 1933 ====
Throughout the existence of the Weimar Republic, politics in the province was dominated by the nationalist conservative DNVP (German National People's Party). The Nazi party (NSDAP) did not have any significant success at elections, nor did it have a substantial number of members. The Pomeranian Nazi party was founded by students of the University of Greifswald in 1922, when the NSDAP was officially forbidden. The university's rector Theodor Vahlen became Gauleiter (head of the provincial party) in 1924. Soon afterwards, he was fired by the university and went bankrupt. In 1924, the party had 330 members, and in December 1925, 297 members. The party was not present in all of the province. The members were concentrated mainly in Western Pomerania and internally divided. Vahlen retired from the Gauleiter position in 1927 and was replaced by Walther von Corswant, a Pomeranian knight estate holder.

Corswant led the party from his estate in Kuntzow. In the 1928 Reichstag elections, the Nazis got 1.5% of the votes in Pomerania. Party property was partially pawned. In 1929, the party gained 4.1% of the votes. Corswant was fired after conflicts with the party's leadership and replaced with Wilhelm Karpenstein, one of the former students who formed the Pomeranian Nazi party in 1922 and, since 1929, a lawyer in Greifswald. He moved the headquarters to Stettin and replaced many of the party officials, predominantly with young radicals. In the Reichstag elections of September 14, 1930, the party gained a significant 24.3% of the Pomeranian votes and thus became the second strongest party, the strongest still being the DNVP, which however was internally divided in the early 1930s. In the elections of July 1932, the Nazis gained 48% of the Pomeranian votes, while the DNVP dropped to 15.8%. In March 1933, the NSDAP gained 56.3%.

==== Nazi government since 1933 ====
Immediately after the Nazi seizure of power, they began arresting their opponents. In March 1933, 200 people were arrested, this number rose to 600 during the following months. In the Bredow (today, Drzetowo) section of Stettin, at the site of the bankrupt AG Vulcan Stettin shipyards, the Nazis set up the short-lived "wild" Vulkanwerft concentration camp from October 1933 to March 1934, where members of the Sturmabteilung (SA) maltreated their victims. The Pomeranian SA in 1933 had grown to 100,000 members.

Oberpräsident Carl von Halfern of the German People's Party was retired in 1933, and with him one third of the Landrat and Oberbürgermeister (mayor) officials in the province. Also in 1933, an election was held for a new provincial Landtag (parliament), which then gained a Nazi majority. Decrees were issued that shifted all issues formerly the responsibility of the parliament to the Provinzialausschuß (provincial committee), and furthermore, shifted the power to decide on these issues from the Provinzialausschuß to the Oberpräsident, although he had to consult with the Provinzialrat (provincial council). Once the power was shifted to the Oberpräsident, all organs of the Provinzialverband, the former provincial self-government, were dissolved except for the downgraded Provinzialrat, which assembled about once a year without exercising its advisory rights. The Landeshauptmann position, the Provinzialverband's head, was not abolished, but from 1933 the Landeshauptmann would be a Nazi who was acting in line with the Oberpräsident. The law entered into force on April 1, 1934.

In 1934, much of the Pomeranian Nazi movement was purged in connection with the Night of the Long Knives. The Pomeranian SA leader SA-Brigadeführer Peter von Heydebreck was shot in Stadelheim Prison in Munich due to his friendship to Ernst Röhm. Gauleiter Karpenstein was arrested, held for two years and banned from Pomerania due to conflicts with the NSDAP headquarters. His successor, Franz Schwede-Coburg, replaced most of Karpenstein's staff with Corswant's earlier staff, friends of his from Bavaria, and Schutzstaffel (SS) members. Of the 27 Kreisleiter officials, 23 were forced out of office by Schwede-Coburg, who was appointed Gauleiter on July 21, and Oberpräsident on July 28, 1934. As in all of Nazi Germany, the Nazis established totalitarian control over the province by Gleichschaltung.

Under the Nazi government, the persecution of Poles in the German-controlled part of Pomerania intensified. In January 1939, Germany resumed expulsions of Poles and many were also forced to flee. The SA, SS, Hitler Youth and Bund Deutscher Osten launched attacks on Polish institutions, schools and activists. From May to August 1939, the Gestapo carried out arrests of Polish leaders, activists, entrepreneurs, and even some staff of the consulate of Poland in Szczecin.

==== German anti-Nazi resistance ====
Resistance groups formed in the economical centers, especially in Stettin, from where most arrests were reported.

Resistance is also reported from members of the nationalist conservative DNVP. The monarchist Herbert von Bismarck-Lasbeck was forced out of office in 1933. The conservative newspaper Pommersche Tagespost was banned in 1935 after printing an article of monarchist Hans-Joachim von Rohr. In 1936, four members of the DNVP were tried for founding a monarchist organization.

Other DNVP members, who had addressed their opposition before 1933, were arrested multiple times after the Nazis had taken over. Ewald Kleist-Schmenzin, Karl Magnus von Knebel-Doberitz, and Karl von Zitzewitz were active resisters.

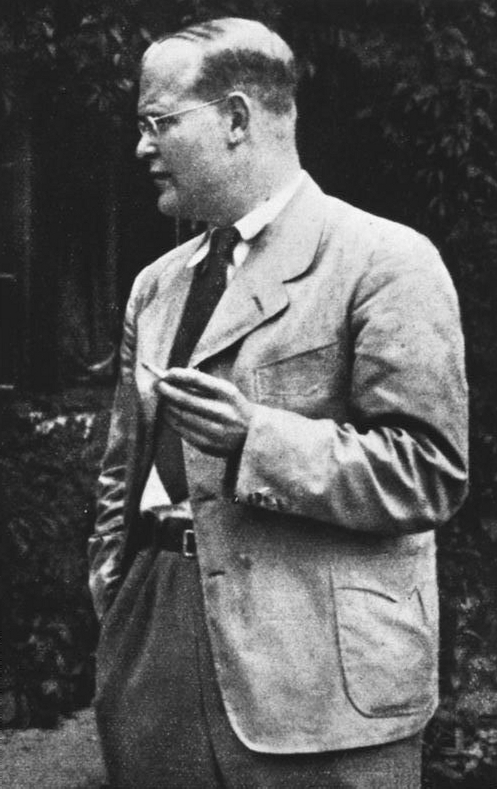
Dietrich Bonhoeffer

Within the Protestant church, resistant was organized within the Pfarrernotbund (150 members in late 1933) and Confessing Church ("Bekennende Kirche"), the successor organization, headed by Reinold von Thadden-Trieglaff. In March 1935, 55 priests were arrested. The Confessing Church maintained a preachers' seminar headed by Dietrich Bonhoeffer in Zingst, which moved to Finkenwalde in 1935 and to Köslin and Groß Schlönwitz in 1940. Within the Catholic Church, the most prominent resistance member was Greifswald priest Alfons Wachsmann, who was executed in 1944.

After the failed assassination attempt on Hitler on July 20, 1944, the Gestapo arrested thirteen Pomeranian nobles and one burgher, all knight estate owners. Of those, Ewald von Kleist-Schmenzin had contacted Winston Churchill in 1938 to inform about the work of the German opposition to the Nazis, and was executed in April 1945. Karl von Zitzewitz had connections to the Kreisauer Kreis group. Among the others arrested were Malte von Veltheim Fürst zu Putbus, who died in a concentration camp, as well as Alexander von Kameke and Oscar Caminecci-Zettuhn, who both were executed.

== Territorial changes in 1938 ==
In 1938–1939, the German as well as the Polish Pomeranian provinces were enlarged. Most of Posen-West Prussia (historic northern Greater Poland) and two counties of Brandenburg were made districts of the German Province of Pomerania. Several counties from the Poznań and Warsaw Voivodeships were joined to the Polish Pomeranian Voivodship, and its capital was moved from Toruń to Bydgoszcz, even though Bydgoszcz is part of historic Kuyavia, not Pomerania.

== World War II (1939–1945) ==
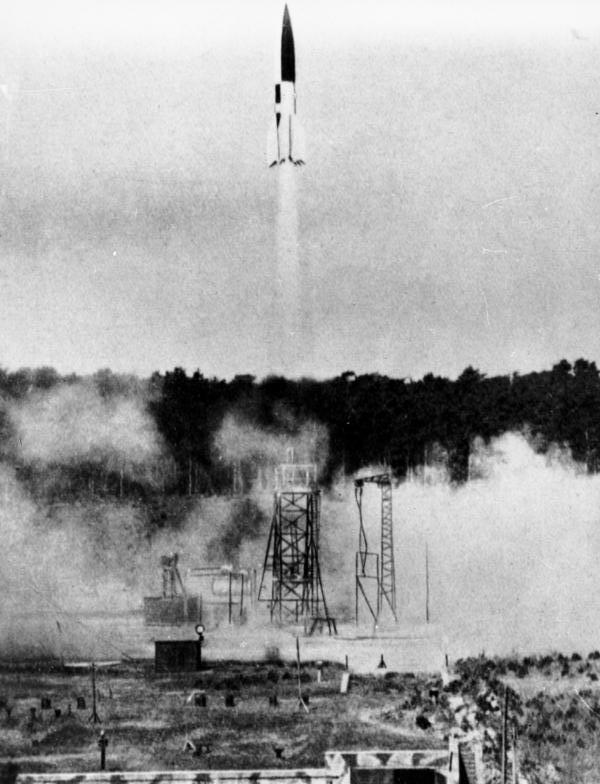
V2 in Peenemünde, 1943

The dispute between Germany and Poland over rights to the Free City of Danzig and land transit through the Polish Corridor to the exclave of East Prussia, served as Hitler's pretext for Germany's invasion of Poland, which commenced on September 1, 1939. The strategy of the Nazi government was to temporarily divide Poland with Stalin's Soviet Union, formalized in the Molotov–Ribbentrop Pact. In the longer perspective, the Nazis aimed to expand the German Lebensraum in the East, to exploit soil, oil, minerals and workforce from the lands of the Slavs, turning them into a race of slaves destined to serve the German 1,000-year Reich and its master race. The fate of other peoples of these territories, notably Jews, ethnic Poles and Gypsies, was to be annihilation and deportation during the Holocaust.

=== Deportation of the Pomeranian Jews ===
In 1933, about 7,800 Jews lived in the province of Pomerania, of which a third lived in Stettin. The other two thirds were living all over the province, Jewish communities numbering more than 200 people were in Stettin, Kolberg, Lauenburg, and Stolp. When the Nazis started to terrorize Jews, many emigrated. Twenty weeks after the Nazis seized power, the number of Jewish Pomeranians had already dropped by eight percent.

Besides the repressions Jews had to endure in all Nazi Germany, including the destruction of the Pomeranian synagogues on November 9, 1938 (Reichskristallnacht), all male Stettin Jews were deported to Oranienburg concentration camp after this event and kept there for several weeks.

On February 12 and 13, 1940, the remaining 1,000 to 1,300 Jews from all the Stettin Region, regardless of sex, age and health, were deported from Stettin and Schneidemühl to the Lublin Reservation, that had been set up following the Nisko Plan in occupied Poland. Among the deported were intermarried non-Jewish women. The deportation was carried out in an inhumane manner. Despite low temperatures, the carriages were not heated. No food had been allowed to be taken along. The property left behind was liquidated. Up to 300 people perished from the deportation itself. In the Lublin area under Kurt Engel's regime, the people were subject to inhumane treatment, starvation and murder. Only a few survived the war.

Regarding the Jewish community from the Schneidemühl area, JewishGen with reference to research by Peter Simonstein Cullman says that the widespread belief of the Schneidemühl Jews being deported along with the Jews from all the Stettin Region is contradicted by the respective files in the Bundesarchiv and USHMM archives. While there were indeed such orders and Jews from the Schneidemühl area were rounded up after 15 February, an intervention of the Association of Jews in Germany (Reichsvereinigung) resulted in a change of the Nazi plans on 21 February: instead of deportation to the Generalgouvernement like the Stettin Jews, these people were to be deported to places within the Altreich. Deportations to transit and death camps followed.

=== Invasion and occupation of Polish Pomerania and Danzig ===
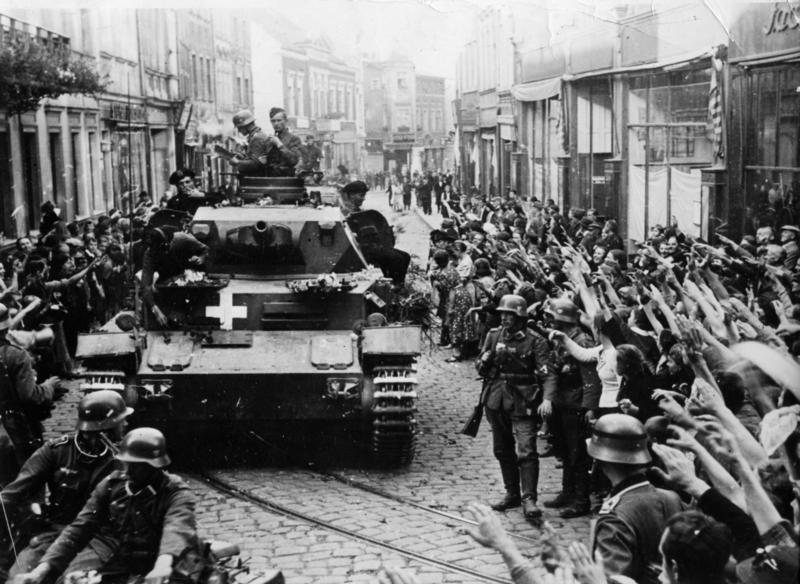
German tank in Grudziądz (1939)

==== Military campaign ====
The invasion of Poland by the Wehrmacht on September 1, 1939, which marked the beginning of World War II, was in part mounted from the province of Pomerania. General Heinz Guderian's 19th army corps attacked from the Schlochau (Człuchów) and Preußisch Friedland (Debrzno) areas, which since 1938 belonged to the province ("Grenzmark Posen-Westpreußen").

Initially, Guderian's tank corps was to pass through Pomerelia on its way to East Prussia. The Guderian corps was to regroup there and attack Warsaw from the east. The Polish opponent was the Army of Pomerania (Armia Pomorze), defeated in the Battle of Tuchola Forest. Krojanty charge was one of the famous episodes of the operation where the Polish cavalry unit charged and dispersed German infantry, but then ran into the machine guns of German hidden armed reconnaissance vehicles. The episode was used in Nazi propaganda.

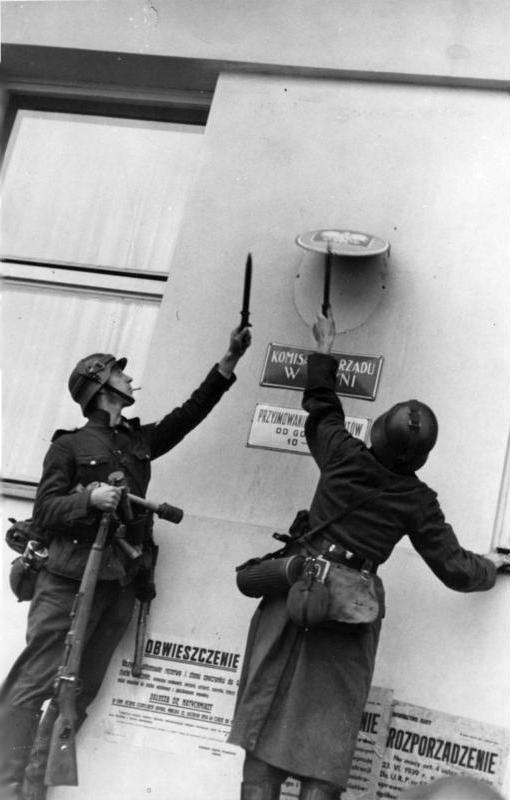
German troops detach Polish signs in Danzig (1939)

After the initial battles in Pomerelia, the remains of the Polish Army of Pomerania withdrew to the southern bank of the Vistula river. After defending Toruń for several days, the army withdrew further south under pressure of the overall strained strategic situation, and took part in the main battle of Bzura. On the borders of the Free City of Danzig, there were two fortified Polish points: the Polish post office in Danzig and the Polish ammunition store on the Westerplatte. Both were ordered to defend up to 12 hours in case of local uprising, until an expected relief by the Polish army. The Polish Post office was held by 52 employees led by Konrad Guderski against the German Danzig police, Home Guard (Heimwehr) and SS, which after 14 hours of battle set the building on fire with flamethrowers. All but four postman who escaped either died in the battle or were executed by the Germans as partisans (only in 1995 did the German court at Lübeck invalidate the 1939 ruling and rehabilitate the "postmen"). The Polish Military Transit Depot (Polska Wojskowa Składnica Tranzytowa) on the Westerplatte repelled countless attacks by the Danzig Police, SS, the Kriegsmarine and the Wehrmacht. Finally, the Westerplatte crew surrendered on 7 September, having exhausted their supplies of food, water, ammunition and medicines, becoming one of the symbols of Polish resistance to the German invasion. The heaviest fighting in Pomerelia took place at the Hel peninsula Polish Navy base, which held out as one of the last centres of Polish military resistance until October 3, 1939 (see Battle of Hel).

==== Reichsgau Danzig-West Prussia ====
The Pomeranian Voivodeship and the Free City of Danzig were annexed by Nazi-Germany on October 8, 1939, and fused into Reichsgau Danzig-West Prussia.

==== Role of German minority during Nazi invasion of Poland and atrocities against the Polish, Kashubian, and Jewish population ====
In the interwar period German minority organizations in Poland such as Jungdeutsche Partei, Deutsche Vereinigung, Deutscher Volksbund and Deutscher Volksverband actively cooperated with Nazi Germany through espionage, sabotage, provocations and political indoctrination. They maintained close contact with and were directed by the NSDAP, Auslandsorganisation, Gestapo, SD and Abwehr. In Pomerania German secret organisations were established with the aim of taking part in dismemberment of Poland and weapons were smuggled across the German border

After the war started, acts of sabotage occurred and Polish authorities interned 126 Germans in Pomeranian Voivodeship suspected of cooperating with Nazis and involved in anti-Polish activities, based on previously prepared lists, and shipped them away east from the potential front line.

Before the war, activists from German minority organisations in Poland helped to organize lists of Poles who later were to be arrested or executed in Operation Tannenberg.

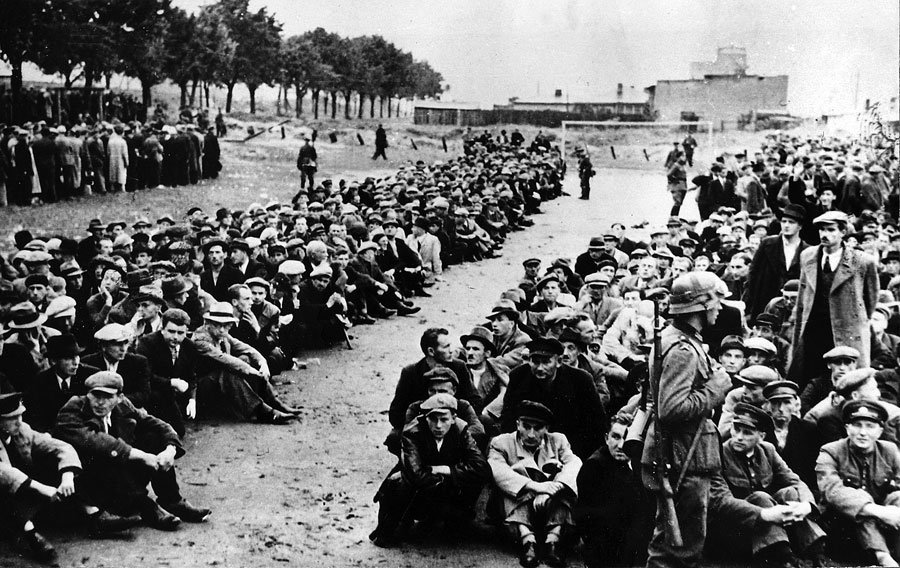
Poles arrested by the Germans in Gdynia in September 1939

With the beginning of the Invasion of Poland on 1 September 1939, Selbstschutz units engaged in hostility towards the Polish population and military, and performed sabotage operations helping the German attack on the Polish state.

Bernhard Chiari and Jerzy Kochanowski state estimates of an overall death toll ranging from 2,000 to 3,841 West Prussian ethnic Germans who lost their lives in the context of the invasion. In a report issued after the German historians' summit in 2000, death toll estimates were summarized at about 4,500 in West Prussia, including those killed in ethnic violence, those killed while serving in the Polish army, and those killed in other war-related events like German air raids. Historian Tomasz Chinciński gives a total of 3,257 deaths, 2000 of them being victims either of the normal wartime conditions (including civilians incidentally killed by advancing German army), or of participation in diversionary actions organized by Nazi sympathetics. The most infamous supposed incident of violence involving suspected Nazi fifth columnists was Bloody Sunday in Bydgoszcz, which was used excessively by Nazi propaganda, which vastly inflated death tolls initially to 5,800 and then in 1940 to 58,000. For propaganda purposes, the attacks on ethnic Germans were exploited as an apparent justification for 'ethnic cleansing' and retaliation.

By 5 October 1939, in West Prussia, Selbstschutz units made up of German minority members under the command of Ludolf von Alvensleben were 17,667 men strong, and had already executed 4,247 Poles, while Alvensleben complained to Selbstschutz officers that too few Poles had been shot. (German officers had reported that only a fraction of Poles had been "destroyed" in the region with the total number of those executed in West Prussia during this action being about 20,000. One Selbstschutz commander, Wilhelm Richardt, said in Karolewo (Karlhof) camp that he did not want to build big camps for Poles and feed them, and that it was an honour for Poles to fertilize the German soil with their corpses.

About 80% of the German male adults of the Reichsgau were organized by the SS in Selbstschutz units following the German conquest. Wehrmacht, Selbstschutz, Einsatzgruppen of Sipo and SD, and Danzig NSDAP units were involved in a series of atrocities committed during and after the invasion, including murder primarily of Polish intelligentsia, Jews, and the extermination of mentally and physically disabled, most notably at the massacres in Piaśnica forest. This resulted in between 12,000 and 20,000 dead until October 25, and up to 60,000 dead in the first six month. The highest death toll was paid during the initial stage of the occupation. Estimates range from 36.000 to 42.000 killed.

Units were prepared before the war to sabotage Polish war efforts as well as organized mass executions of Poles. Executions aiming at the extermination of the Polish population started only hours after the invasion. During September 1939, the Wehrmacht took the main part in atrocities, along with Einsatzgruppen of Sipo and SD (police and security service). From September 1939 to January 1940, atrocities were primarily committed by Selbstschutz units.

During the September campaign, security police set up the first concentration camps for Poles. Deportations to the General Government and Stutthof soon followed. Use of the Polish language was strictly forbidden, even in church, by the German Roman Catholic Bishop Carl Maria Splett.

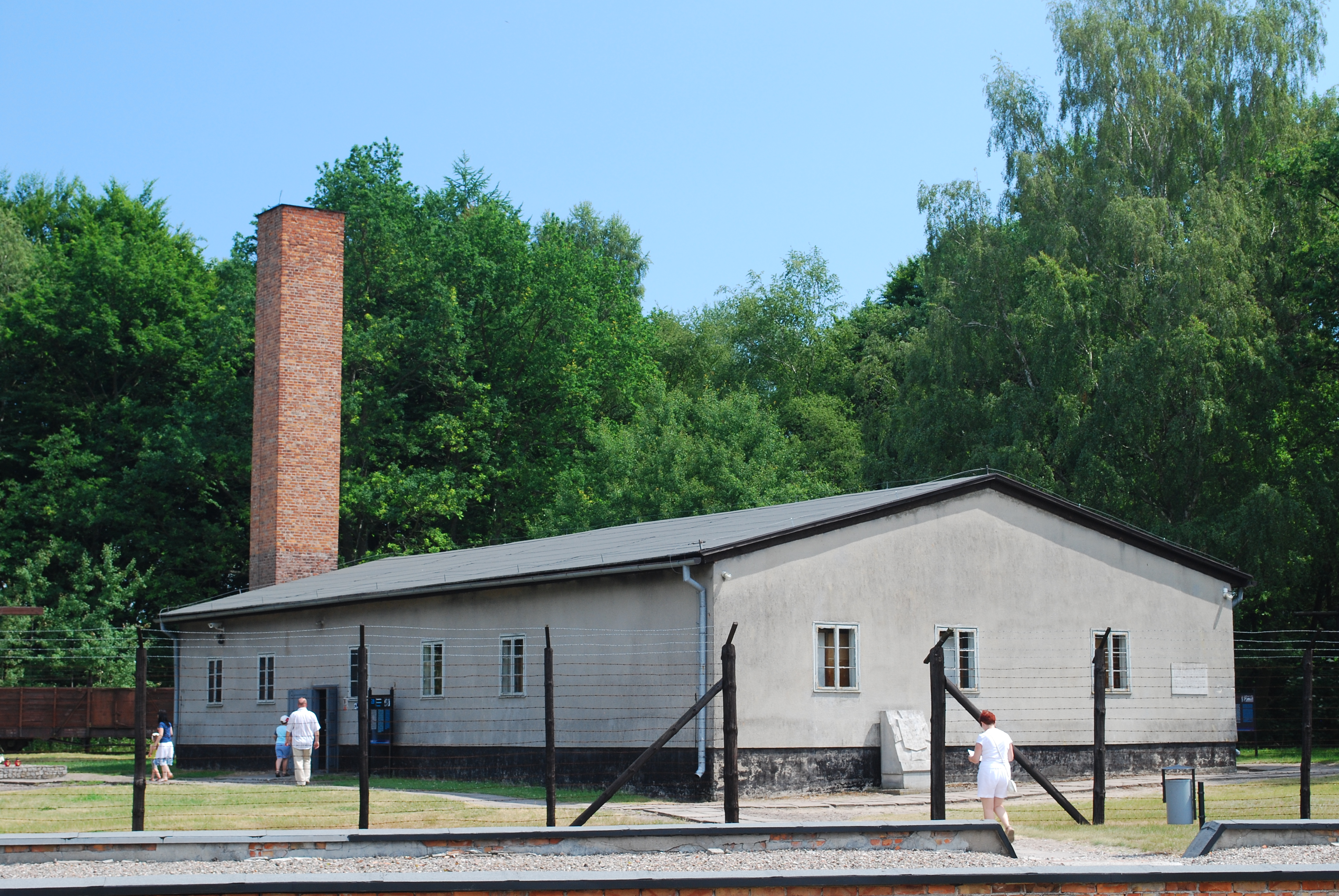
Crematorium of the Stutthof concentration camp, the largest concentration camp in German-occupied Pomerania

Provisional prisons were set up in Danzig (Gdańsk) and Pruszcz Gdański. Prisoners were treated extremely brutally. Later Poles who were arrested were moved to Stutthof concentration camp. In Gdynia, based on lists prepared before the war, units of SS-Wachsturmbann Eimann, military units, Gestapo, and police arrested thousands of people. They were transported to concentration camps in Gdynia-Grabówek, Redłów, Victoria Schule or Stutthof.

On the territories of counties: Tczewski, Starogardzki, Kartuski, Kościerski and Morski numerous arrests and executions took place. In the area of Szpęgawski Forest many Jews were murdered.

In October 1939, the Polish intelligentsia of Toruń was imprisoned in "Fort VIII" under harsh conditions, before being executed in Barbarka forest (several hundreds), the local airport, and Przysiek.

Also in October 1939, 300 citizens of Grudziądz were murdered in Góry Księże and Mniszek.

===== Operation Tannenberg =====
Germans especially targeted Polish intellectual and national elites, primarily priests, teachers, lawyers, doctors, officers, land owners, state officials, members of political and social organisations, as well as anyone that could hinder the German plan to enslave the Polish nation (see Operation Tannenberg).

The first pogroms were conducted by Wehrmacht units and Sipo and SD Einsatzgruppen. They arrested and executed political, social, and cultural activists as well as local government officials. Offices, institutions, and locations of Polish social and political organisations were penetrated. This action was codenamed Operation Tannenberg. Goals were the liquidation of intellectual elites, and destruction of Polish culture, institutions and organisations. Operational groups and Selbstschutz received orders to "politically cleanse the areas". The first arrests of Poles started after the Wehrmacht arrived in Danzig on 1 September 1939. With the help of units from SA, SS, and local police, Polish offices and institutions were taken over. Polish State Railways workers and custom officers were executed in Szymanków, Kałdów, or in their offices.

Concentration camps for Polish intelligentsia and Jews were set up in the second half of September 1939 in Karolew and Radzim, located in Sępolno powiat.

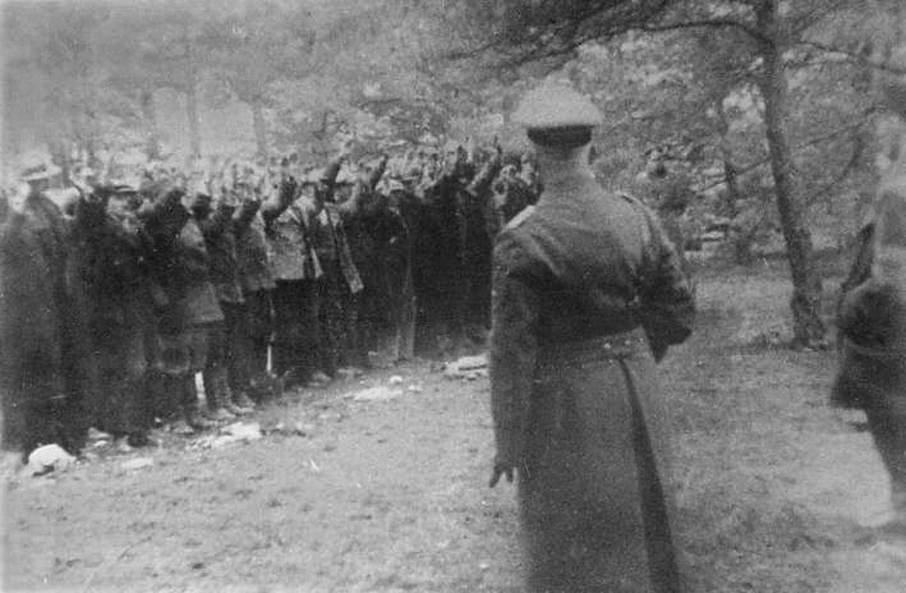
Massacres in Piaśnica

A high death toll was paid by the Polish clergy. It was a consequence of the old Prussian belief that the Catholic Church is the main pillar of Polish nation and patriotism. This belief was particularly expressed by Albert Forster, Gauleiter in Reichsgau Danzig-West Prussia. From 701 priests of the Diocese of Chełmno on September 1, 1939, 322 were executed or died in concentration camps. 38 clergy from Starogard Gdański were executed in the Forest of Szpęgawsk on October 20, 1939. The same day, lecturers and students from Pelpin seminary were arrested by Gestapo and afterwards executed. Similar incidents happened in most of Pomerelia.

Piaśnica Wielka was one of the first execution sites in occupied Poland. The executions took place between October 1939 and April 1940. Among others, intellectuals from Gdańsk, Gdynia, Wejherowo, and Kartuzy were murdered at this site. Additionally, about 2000 mental care clients from the "Altreich" were murdered there. Overall, an estimated 10,000 to 12,000 were killed.

===== Polish and Kashubian resistance =====
Some Poles and Kashubians of Pomerelia organized an anti-Nazi guerrilla resistance group called "Pomeranian Griffin" (TOW Gryf Pomorski). The main Polish resistance organization, Armia Krajowa (Home Army), had a dedicated "Pomerania" district, itself was part of the larger "Western" district. It had units both in the pre-war Polish part and the pre-war German part of Pomerania.

Activities included secret Polish schooling, printing and distribution of Polish underground press, sabotage actions, espionage of German activity, smuggling data on German persecution of Poles and Jews and on German V-weapons to Western Europe, and facilitating escapes of endangered Polish resistance members and Polish, British, French and Russian prisoners of war who fled from German POW camps via the port cities to neutral Sweden. In 1943, local Poles managed to save some kidnapped Polish children from the Zamość region, by buying them from the Germans during transport through Pomerania. The Gestapo cracked down on the Polish resistance several times, with the Poles either killed or sent to prisons of concentration camps.

=== Province of Pomerania 1939–1944 ===
In September 1939, the persecution of Poles from pre-war German Pomerania reached its climax with mass arrests of Polish activists, teachers etc., who were then sent to concentration camps.

On manors and bigger farms Polish prisoners of war partly replaced German workforce. In the cities, Polish forced-labourers were exploited by German companies and factories.

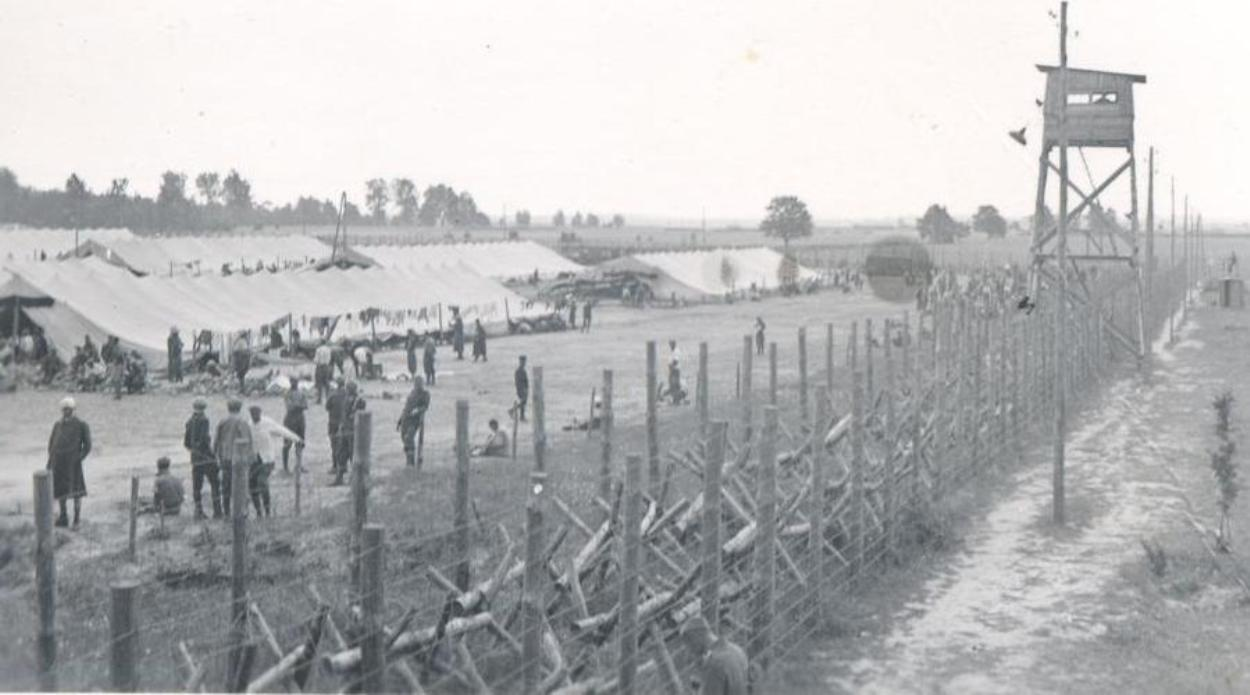
Stalag II-D POW camp in Stargard

Germany operated several prisoner-of-war camps, including Stalag II-B, Stalag II-C, Stalag II-D, Stalag II-E, Stalag Luft I, Stalag Luft II, Stalag Luft IV, Stalag Luft 7, Stalag 302, Stalag 351, Oflag II-D and Oflag 65, for Polish POWs and civilians, including women and children, and French, Belgian, Dutch, Serbian, Italian, American, Canadian, Australian, New Zealander, Czech, Soviet, Senegalese, Tunisian, Moroccan, Algerian, South African and other Allied POWs, with numerous forced labour subcamps in the region.

There were also several subcamps of the Stutthof and Ravensbrück concentration camps, whose prisoners were Polish, Jewish, Ukrainian, French, Russian, Yugoslav, Italian, Croatian, Romani, Lithuanian, Latvian, German, Greek, and several Nazi prisons with numerous forced labour subcamps in the region. Połczyn-Zdrój was the location of a Germanisation camp for kidnapped Polish children. Unieszyno and Police housed camps for Sinti and Romani people (see Romani Holocaust).

Roughly 60,000 German men from Pomerania died as soldiers in the Wehrmacht and SS until May, 1945.

Since 1943, the province became a target of allied air raids. The first attack was launched against Stettin on April 21, 1943, and left 400 dead. On August 17/18, the British RAF launched an attack on Peenemünde, where Wernher von Braun and his staff had developed and tested the world's first rockets. In October, Anklam was a target. Throughout 1944 and early 1945, Stettin's industrial and residential areas were targets of air raids. Stralsund was a target in October 1944.

Despite these raids, the province was regarded "safe" compared to other areas of the Third Reich, and thus became a shelter for evacuees primarily from hard hit Berlin and the West German industrial centers.

After the war had turned back on Germany, the Pomeranian Wall was renovated in the summer of 1944, and in the fall all men between sixteen and sixty years of age who had not yet been drafted were enrolled into Volkssturm units.

The province of Pomerania became a battlefield on January 26, 1945, when in the pretext of the Red Army's East Pomeranian Offensive Soviet tanks entered the province near Schneidemühl (Piła), which surrendered on February 13.

=== East Pomeranian offensive ===
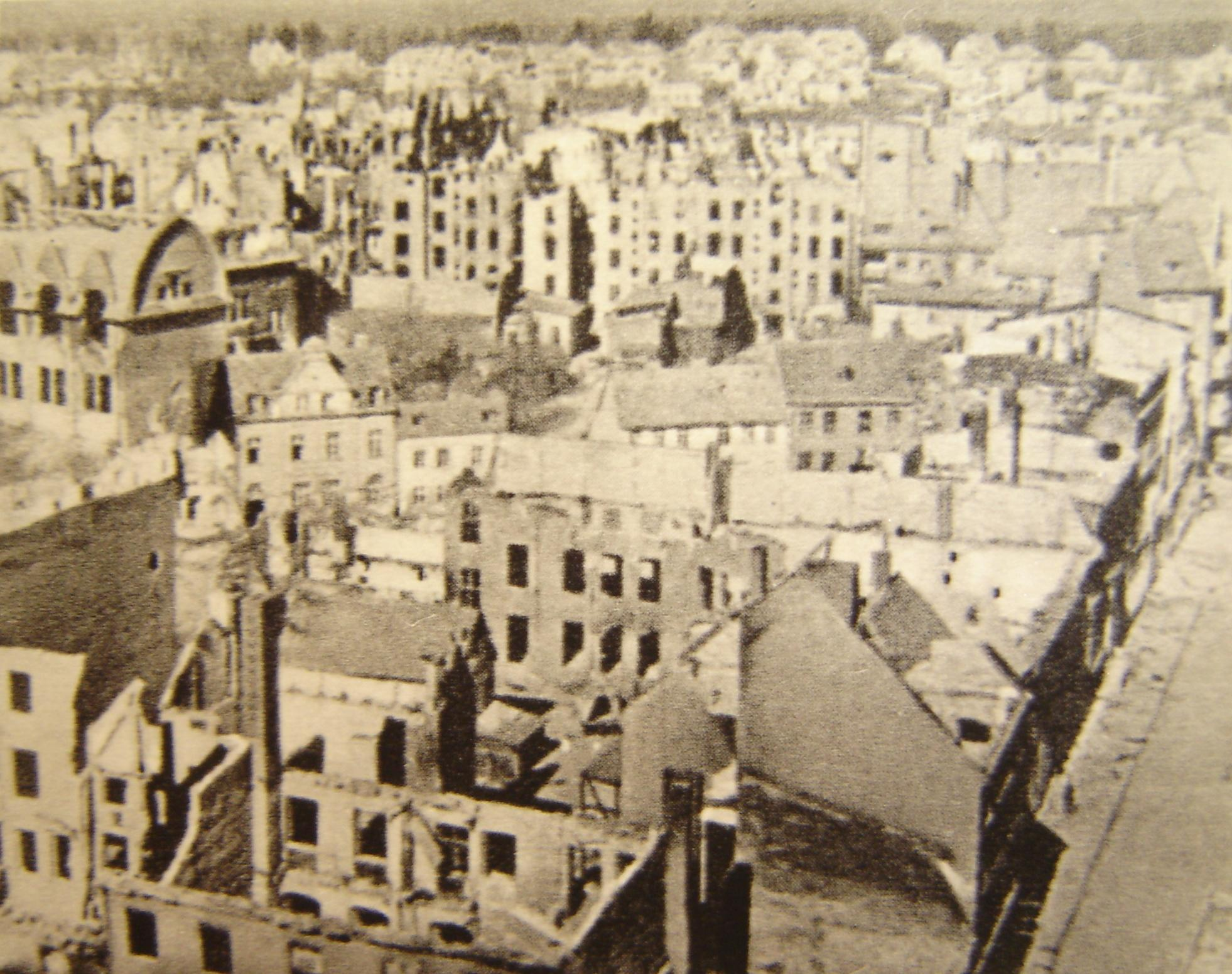
The Battle of Kolberg left 80% of the town in ruins.

On February 14, the remnants of German Army Group Vistula ("Heeresgruppe Weichsel") had managed to set up a frontline roughly at the province's southern frontier, and launched a counterattack (Operation Solstice, "Sonnenwende") on February 15, that however stalled already on February 18. On February 24, the Second Belorussian Front launched the East Pomeranian Offensive and despite heavy resistance primarily in the Rummelsburg area took eastern Farther Pomerania until March 10. On March 1, the First Belorussian Front had launched an offensive from the Stargard and Märkisch Friedland (Mirosławiec) area and succeeded in taking northwestern Farther Pomerania within five days. Cut off corps group Hans von Tettau retreated to Dziwna as a moving pocket until March 11. Thus, German-held central Farther Pomerania was cut off, and taken after the Battle of Kolberg (March 4 to March 18).

The fast advances of the Red Army during the East Pomeranian Offensive caught the civilian Farther Pomeranian population by surprise. The land route to the west was blocked since early March. Evacuation orders were issued not at all or much too late. The only way out of Farther Pomerania was via the ports of Stolpmünde (Ustka), from which 18,300 were evacuated, Rügenwalde (Darłowo), from which 4,300 were evacuated, and Kolberg (Kołobrzeg), which had been declared fortress and from which before the end of the Battle of Kolberg some 70,000 were evacuated. Those left behind became victims of murder, war rape, and plunder. On March 6, the USAF bombed Swinemünde, where thousands of refugees were stranded, killing an estimated 25,000.

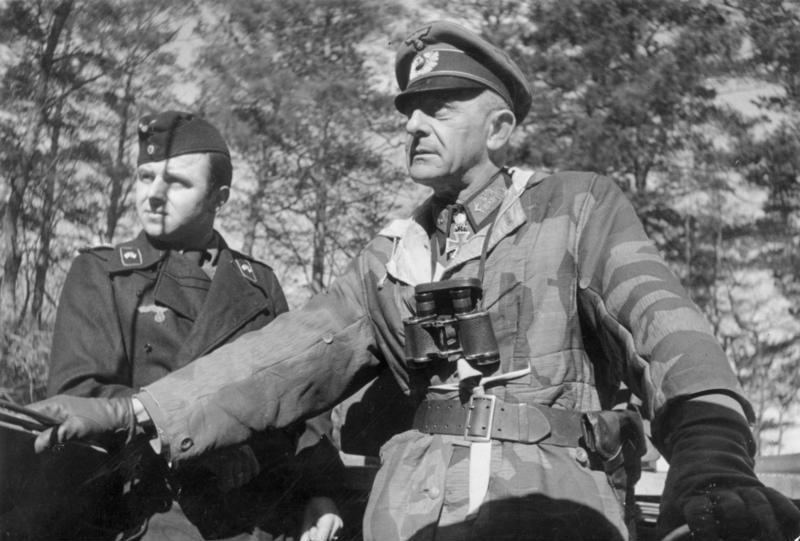
Karl Mauss in occupied Gdynia, March 1945

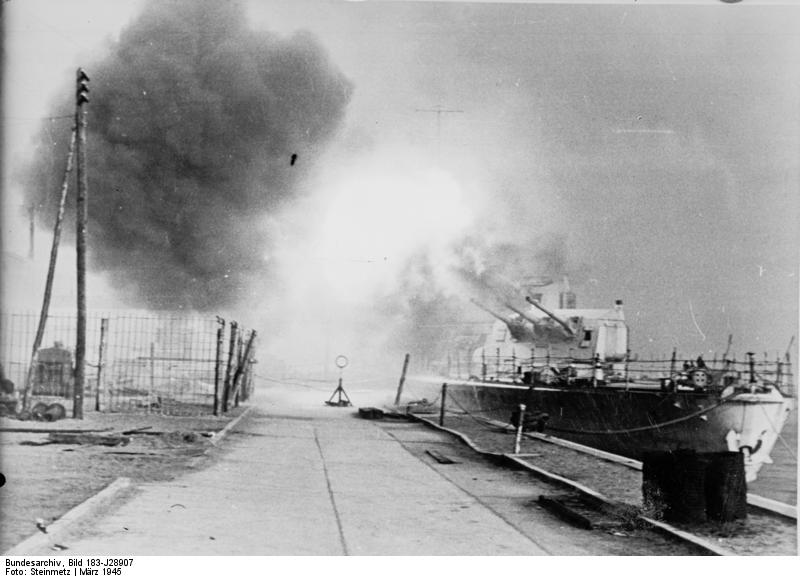
German navy shelling Soviets in Gdynia, March 1945

Many Germans fled westward as the Red Army advanced on the Eastern Front. The Hel Peninsula and Hel town, northwest of Danzig, were defended by the German army until the end of the war on May 9, 1945. 900,000 people were evacuated by ship, mainly by the Kriegsmarine. 200,000 could flee to the more western provinces of Germany on land (most before March, 1945). Only 3% of those who fled per ship died on the Baltic sea due to Soviet torpedoes. On land, due to the harsh winter and due to Soviet air raids, the losses among civilians were much higher.

The roving cauldron of Hans von Tettau's corps was defended by some 10,000 to 16,000 troops, stemming primarily from the remnants of the "Holstein" and "Pommerland" Panzer Divisions, taking with them about 40,000 civilians. This group had managed to break through the Soviet encirclement north of Schivelbein (Świdwin) and fought their way toward the coastline. Hoping for evacuation by the German navy, they secured a bridgehead near Hoff and Horst (Niechorze). As evacuation did not happen, they moved on to Dievenow, from where they were ferried to Wollin island on March 11 and 12.

East of the Oder river, the Wehrmacht's 3rd Panzer Army had set up the Altdamm (Dąbie) bridgehead between Gollnow (Goleniów) and Greifenhagen (Gryfino). The Red Army cleared the areas south of the bridgehead with the 47th Army until March 6, and the areas north of it with the 3rd Shock Army, reaching the coast on 9 March. On March 15, Adolf Hitler ordered some of the defending units to reinforce the 9th Army near Küstrin (Kostrzyn nad Odrą), seriously weakening the Altdamm bridgehead. General Hasso von Manteuffel, in command since 10 March, was unable to further defend the bridgehead after March 19, evacuated most of it on 20 March and had the Oder bridges blown up. The Red Army took the remaining pockets of the former bridgehead on March 21. About 40,000 German troops had been killed and 12,000 captured defending the bridgehead.

=== Battle of Berlin ===
On March 20, the Wehrmacht abandoned the last bridgehead on the Oder river's eastern bank, the Altdamm area. The frontline then ran along Dievenow and lower Oder, and was held by the 3rd Panzer Army commanded by General Manteuffel. After another four days of fighting, the Red Army managed to break through and cross the Oder between Stettin and Gartz (Oder), thus starting the northern theater of the Battle of Berlin on March 24. Stettin was abandoned the next day.

Throughout April, the Second Belorussian Front led by general Konstantin Rokossovsky advanced through Western Pomerania. Demmin and Greifswald surrendered on April 30.

In Demmin, nearly 900 people committed mass suicides in fear of the Red Army. Coroner lists show that most drowned in the nearby River Tollense and River Peene, whereas others poisoned themselves. This was fueled by atrocities – rapes, pillage and executions committed by Red Army soldiers until the city commander had the access to the rivers blocked on May 3.

In the first days of May, the Wehrmacht abandoned Usedom and Wolin islands, and on May 5, the last German troops departed from Sassnitz on the island of Rügen. Two days later, the Wehrmacht surrendered unconditionally to the Red Army.

=== Evacuation ===
Pomeranian Gauleiter Franz Schwede-Coburg predicted a turn of the war until the very end. Evacuation orders therefore were issued either too late or not at all. Schwede-Coburg even had the authorities repel flight attempts by the population.

=== Civilian losses ===
Many Germans in Pomerania, including Danzig (Gdańsk) and Pomerelia, died during and shortly after the war due to air raids, but mainly afterwards due to Soviet Red Army atrocities committed in revenge against the German civilians.

The official post-war West German Schieder commission estimated German civilian losses in all of the territories generally called "Pomerania" at:

- Danzig: 100,000 dead out of 404,000 inhabitants, living there in December 1944.
- German Province of Pomerania: 440,000 dead out of 1,895,000 inhabitants, living there in December 1944.
- West Prussia (Pomerelia): 70,000 of 310,000 inhabitants, living there in December 1944 (of which 100,000 were "settlers" transferred to this province by the Nazi government).

== See also ==
- Wehrmacht prison Anklam
