= Walther von Corswant =

German politician (1886–1942)

Gauleiter of Gau Pomerania
- In office 21 August 1927 – 1 April 1931
- Appointed by: Adolf Hitler
- Preceded by: Theodor Vahlen
- Succeeded by: Wilhelm Karpenstein

Deputy Gauleiter of Gau Pomerania
- In office 1 May 1927 – 21 August 1927
- Appointed by: Adolf Hitler
- Preceded by: Position established
- Succeeded by: Robert Schulz

District Administrator of Greifswald Landkreis
- In office 27 February 1936 – 12 December 1942

Personal details
- Born: 14 April 1886 Gumbinnen, East Prussia, German Empire
- Died: 12 December 1942 (aged 56) Greifswald, Pomerania, Nazi Germany
- Party: Nazi Party
- Other political affiliations: German Völkisch Freedom Party
- Education: Deutsche Kolonialschule
- Occupation: Farmer; Estate Manager

Military service
- Allegiance: German Empire
- Branch/service: Imperial German Army
- Years of service: 1914
- Unit: 2nd Guards Infantry Regiment
- Battles/wars: World War I

Walther von Corswant (14 April 1886 – 12 December 1942) was a German politician who served as the Nazi Party Gauleiter of Gau Pomerania and in several government positions in Nazi Germany.

== Early years ==
Walther von Corswant was born at Gumbinnen (today, Gusev, Kaliningrad Oblast) in 1886, the son of an estate owner. After attending elementary and high school and a year in the military, he attended six semesters between 1904 and 1907 at the Deutsche Kolonialschule in Witzenhausen that trained people in agriculture for resettlement in Germany's overseas colonies. He then worked as a planter in Cameroon and New Guinea. Due to a stomach illness, Corswant left the tropics and returned to Germany. After regaining his health, he studied for a semester at the agricultural college in Jena. Following a one-year unpaid internship in agriculture, Corswant took over his parents' estate, of Kuntzow in the Greifswald district of Pomerania.

At the outbreak of World War I in 1914, Corswant enlisted in the army as a member of the 2nd Guards Infantry Regiment but soon was medically discharged due to a recurrence of his stomach ailment. He returned to agricultural work.

== Nazi Party career ==
In 1923 he joined the Nazi Party (NSDAP) but when it was outlawed following the Beer Hall Putsch, he associated with the German Völkisch Freedom Party. After the ban on the Nazis was lifted, Corswant rejoined the Party on 10 June 1925 (membership number 7,342). He was made Bezirksleiter (District Leader) in Vorpommern (Western Pomerania). By 1927, Adolf Hitler was replacing several early Party leaders whom he considered to be too socialistic or not to have the necessary attributes to be effective administrators. Consequently, on 1 May 1927 Corswant was appointed Deputy to Gauleiter Theodor Vahlen of Pomerania who was placed on indefinite leave, and von Corswant effectively was left in charge. On 21 August, Vahlen was formally relieved of his position and Corswant officially became Gauleiter.

In November 1929, Corswant became the parliamentary group leader of the NSDAP bloc in the Provincial Landtag of the Province of Pomerania. At the same time he was also a member of the Provincial Committee. Also in 1929, he founded a weekly Nazi newspaper, Die Diktatur. In the election of September 1930, Corswant was elected to the Reichstag for electoral constituency 6 (Pomerania) and remained a member of the German parliament until his death.

Corswant remained Gauleiter of Pomerania until 1 April 1931 when he was succeeded by Wilhelm Karpenstein. He then took up a position in the Economic Policy Department of the Party central leadership (Reichsleitung) in Munich. Until the Nazi seizure of power in 1933, Corswant acted as the department's representative to the Weimar Republic. On 1 October 1935, Corswant became a member of the Reich Farmers’ Council (Reichsbauernrat) serving until April 1941, when he became a member of the Reich Advisory Council for Food and Agriculture. Also in 1935, Corswant was made a member of the Prussian Provincial Council for Pomerania, and on 27 February 1936 he was appointed District Administrator of the Greifswald Landkreis (District). He retained both of these positions until his death. On 23 April 1936, Corswant was named to the Supreme Court of Honor and Discipline of the German Labor Front (DAF). Corswant died on 12 December 1942 in Greifswald and was buried in the chapel of the family's Kuntzow estate.

== Sources ==
- Höffkes, Karl (1986). Hitlers Politische Generale. Die Gauleiter des Dritten Reiches: ein biographisches Nachschlagewerk. Tübingen: Grabert-Verlag. ISBN 3-87847-163-7.
- Miller, Michael D.; Schulz, Andreas (2012). 'Gauleiter: The Regional Leaders of the Nazi Party and Their Deputies, 1925-1945. Vol. I (Herbert Albrecht - H. Wilhelm Hüttmann). R. James Bender Publishing. ISBN 978-1-932970-21-0.
- Orlow, Dietrich (1969). The History of the Nazi Party: 1919-1933. University of Pittsburgh Press. ISBN 0-8229-3183-4.
