= Gau Pomerania =

Administrative division of Nazi Germany from 1933 to 1945

- Gau of Nazi Germany
- 1925–1945
- Flag Coat of arms

- Capital: Stettin
- Government
- Gauleiter
  - 1925–1927: Theodor Vahlen
  - 1927–1931: Walther von Corswant
  - 1931–1934: Wilhelm Karpenstein
  - 1934–1945: Franz Schwede-Coburg
- History
  - Establishment: 22 March 1925
  - Disestablishment: 1 August 1945
Preceded by	Succeeded by
Province of Pomerania (1815–1945)	Mecklenburg-Vorpommern; Poland
- Today part of: Germany Poland

The Gau Pomerania (German: Gau Pommern) formed on 22 March 1925, was an administrative division of Nazi Germany from 1933 to 1945 comprising the Prussian province of Pomerania. Before that, from 1925 to 1933, it was the regional subdivision of the Nazi Party in that area. Most of the Gau became part of Poland after the Second World War while the remainder became part of what would become East Germany.

== History ==
The Nazi Gau (plural Gaue) system was originally established in a party conference on 22 May 1926, in order to improve administration of the party structure. From 1933 onwards, after the Nazi seizure of power, the Gaue increasingly replaced the German states as administrative subdivisions in Germany.

At the head of each Gau stood a Gauleiter, a position which became increasingly more powerful, especially after the outbreak of the Second World War, with little interference from above. Local Gauleiters often held government positions as well as party ones and were in charge of, among other things, propaganda and surveillance and, from September 1944 onward, the Volkssturm and the defense of the Gau.

The position of Gauleiter in Pomerania was first held by Theodor Vahlen from 1925 to 1927 when he was dismissed because of his association with Gregor and Otto Strasser. He was succeeded as Gauleiter by Walther von Corswant from 1927 to 1931, who continued to represent Pomerania as a Reichstag member until his death in 1942. The post of Gauleiter was next held by Wilhelm Karpenstein from 1931 to 1934, followed by Franz Schwede-Coburg from 1934 to 1945. Karpenstein survived the war and died in 1968. Franz Schwede was the first Nazi Party member to become Mayor of a German city, Coburg in Bavaria, and was therefore awarded the honorary addition of Coburg to his name by Adolf Hitler. Highly anti-Semitic Schwede-Coburg had the last Jews in Pomerania deported in early 1940 and thereby made the Gau the first to be Judenrein, free of Jews.

The local Polish population was subjected to persecution, which intensified during the German invasion of Poland at the start of World War II in September 1939 with mass arrests of Polish activists, teachers etc., who were then sent to concentration camps.

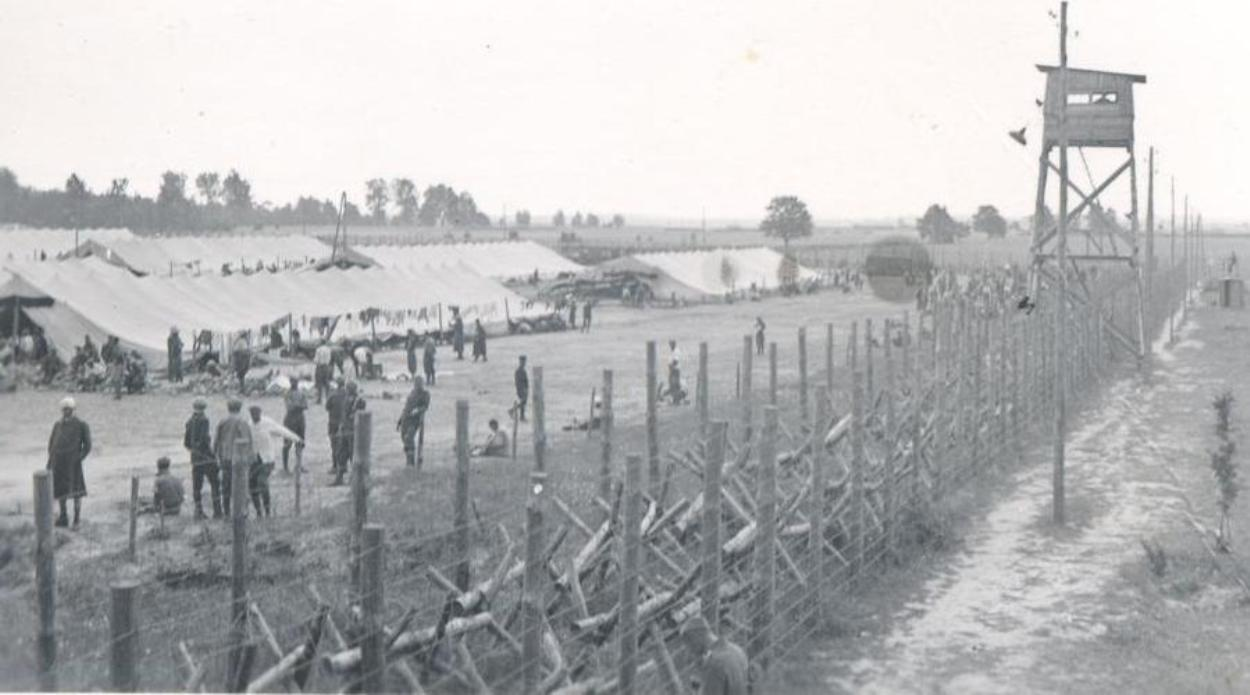
Stalag II-D in Stargard

Germany operated several prisoner-of-war camps, including Stalag II-B, Stalag II-C, Stalag II-D, Stalag II-E, Stalag Luft I, Stalag Luft II, Stalag Luft IV, Stalag Luft 7, Stalag 302, Stalag 351, Oflag II-B, Oflag II-C, Oflag II-D and Oflag 65, for Polish POWs and civilians, including women and children, and French, Belgian, Dutch, Serbian, Italian, American, Canadian, Australian, New Zealander, Czech, Soviet, Senegalese, Tunisian, Moroccan, Algerian, South African and other Allied POWs, with numerous forced labour subcamps in the region.

There were also several subcamps of the Stutthof concentration camp and several Nazi prisons with numerous forced labour subcamps in the region. Połczyn-Zdrój was the location of a Germanisation camp for kidnapped Polish children. Piła, Unieszyno and Police housed camps for Sinti and Romani people (see Romani Holocaust).

The Polish resistance movement was active in the region, including the Odra organization and local units of the Home Army. Activities included espionage of German military activity, infiltration of the local German industry, sabotage actions, distribution of Polish underground press, and facilitating escapes of Polish and British prisoners of war who fled from German POW camps by the Baltic Sea to neutral Sweden.

In early 1945, German-perpetrated death marches of prisoners of German POW camps and concentration camps passed through the region.

When Soviet forces reached Pomerania Schwede-Coburg delayed the order of evacuation, thereby abandoning much of the population and goods behind enemy lines. His insistence in sending under-trained Volkssturm units into battle caused Pomerania to have the third-highest Volkssturm casualty of all German Gaue. He escaped from Pomerania but was captured by British forces. Sent to prison for 10 years in 1948, he died in Coburg in 1960.

== See also ==
- Gauliga Pommern, the highest association football league in the Gauliga from 1933 to 1945
