= Emil Mazuw =

German Nazi, Ostsee Higher SS and Police leader, SS-Obergruppenführer

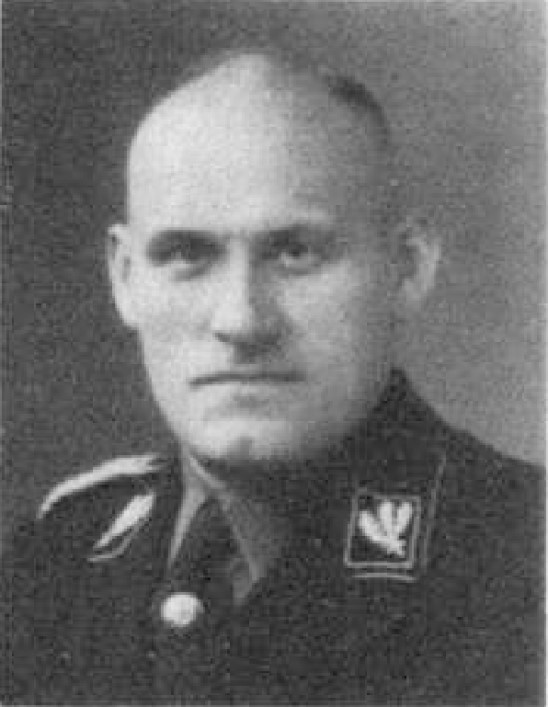
- Born: 21 September 1900; Essen, German Empire
- Died: 11 December 1987 (aged 87); Karlsruhe, Germany

Emil Mazuw, formerly Emil Maschuw (21 September 1900 – 11 December 1987) was Landeshauptmann (nominal governor) of the Province of Pomerania from 1940 to 1945. He was a member of the Schutzstaffel beginning in 1933. He held the ranks of SS-Obergruppenführer, General of the Waffen-SS (1944), General of Police (1942) and Ostsee Higher SS and Police leader (1939–1945). He had involvement with the euthanasia that was used during World War II. After the war, he was convicted of crimes associated with abuse of political prisoners and Jews. He was sentenced to 16 years imprisonment.

== Life ==
Mazuw, the son of a factory worker, was a trained metal worker. In 1918 he voluntarily joined the Imperial German Navy, and saw service in the First World War. After the armistice, his ship along with the rest of the German High Seas Fleet was interned by the British at Scapa Flow. After the German Sailors scuttled their ships, they were held in English prisoner of war camps. Mazuw was returned to Germany in 1920.

He remained in the Reichsmarine until 1921, then worked as a factory worker until 1925. He remained unemployed until 1932, when he worked as a truck driver in Coburg. His 1932 marriage granted him three children. In 1928 he joined the Sturmabteilung (SA) and the Nazi Party (member number: 85231), changing to join the SS in 1930 (member number: 2556).

Mazuw was head of SS-Abschnitt XVIII from November 1933 until the beginning of September 1934, when he subsequently became leader of SS-Abschnitt XIII until April 1936. In 1936, he was elected as a deputy of the Reichstag from electoral constituency 6 (Pomerania). He was reelected in 1938, retaining this seat until the fall of the Nazi regime. From April 1936 until the beginning of May 1945, Mazuw was leader of the Ostsee SS-Oberabschnitt, and from August 1938 to the end of the same period, he was Higher SS and Police leader (HSSPF) in the district Nord ("North"), in 1940 renamed Ostsee ("Baltic Sea"), with his office in Stettin. Of eighteen HSSPFs in Nazi Germany, Mazuw was the only one who held this position more than five years.

From 1940 to 1945, he was Landeshauptmann (nominal governor) of the Province of Pomerania. In this position, together with Pomeranian Gauleiter Franz Schwede-Coburg, he was engaged in the "Aktion T4" euthanasia action, aiding the dispatchment of some 1,400 mental care clients from Pomeranian sanatoria in Stralsund, Ueckermünde, Treptow an der Rega (today, Trzebiatów), Lauenburg and Meseritz-Obrawalde (today, Międzyrzecz) to an execution site in Piasnitz (today, Wielka Piaśnica) in Reichsgau Danzig-West Prussia, where they were shot.

Himmler, however, thought that Mazuw was not active enough, and in December 1944 sent him a letter of reprimand (..."you are a representative of the SS and not that of the local mayor or of the local party offices working against the SS"...).

Writer Igor Witkowski has speculated that Mazuw was involved in secret programs to develop a Wunderwaffe, a new type of weapon supposed to change the course of World War II.

After the war, Mazuw was held captive. In 1948, he was prosecuted relating to denazification proceedings and was sentenced to eight years in prison. On the basis of severely abusing political prisoners and Jews in 1933, he received another 8 1/2 year prison sentence in 1951. Mazuw was released from prison in December 1951. He later found employment, and he died in December 1987 in Karlsruhe.

== See also ==
- List SS-Obergruppenführer

== Bibliography ==
- Birn, Ruth Bettina. Die Höheren SS- und Polizeiführer. Himmlers Vertreter im Reich und in den besetzten Gebieten. Droste Verlag, Düsseldorf 1986, ISBN 3-7700-0710-7
- Browning, Christopher R. (2007). The Origins of the Final Solution: The Evolution of Nazi Jewish Policy, September 1939-March 1942. University of Nebraska Press. ISBN 978-0-8032-5979-9.
- Klee, Ernst. Das Personenlexikon zum Dritten Reich, Fischer Verlag, Frankfurt am Main 2007, ISBN 978-3-596-16048-8. (Revised 2nd edition)
- Koehl, Robert Lewis (1983). The Black Corps: the structure and power struggles of the Nazi SS. University of Wisconsin Press. ISBN 0-299-09190-2.
- Longerich, Peter (2012). Heinrich Himmler. Oxford, UK: Oxford University Press. ISBN 978-0-19-965174-0.
- Pfeiffer, Roland (2003). "Lexikon der Wehrmacht. Zur Geschichte der Ordnungspolizei.IV. Höhere SS- und Polizeiführer HSSPF und Befehlshaber der Ordnungspolizei BdO im Reichsgebiet" (in German). Volksbund Deutscher Kriegsgräberfürsorge e.V.
- Witkowski, Igor (2003). Truth about the Wunderwaffe. European History Press. ISBN 83-88259-16-4.
