= Franz Schwede =

German Nazi Party official and politician (1888–1960)

Franz Schwede Franz Schwede-Coburg

Oberpräsident of Pomerania
- In office 30 July 1934 – 8 May 1945
- Appointed by: Adolf Hitler
- Preceded by: Rudolf zur Bonsen
- Succeeded by: Post abolished

Gauleiter of Gau Pomerania
- In office 21 July 1934 – 8 May 1945
- Appointed by: Adolf Hitler
- Preceded by: Wilhelm Karpenstein
- Succeeded by: Post abolished

Regierungspräsident of Lower Bavaria/Upper Palatinate
- In office 1 July 1934 – 20 July 1934

Oberbürgermeister of Coburg
- In office 1 March 1933 – 1 July 1934
- Preceded by: Erich Unverfähr
- Succeeded by: Otto Schmidt

Personal details
- Born: 5 March 1888 Drawöhnen, Kingdom of Prussia, German Empire
- Died: 19 October 1960 (aged 72) Coburg, Bavaria, West Germany
- Party: Nazi Party (NSDAP)
- Other political affiliations: Deutschvölkischer Schutz und Trutzbund; Völkisch-Social Bloc; National Socialist Freedom Movement
- Occupation: Sailor
- Nickname: Nero

Military service
- Allegiance: German Empire
- Branch/service: Imperial German Navy; Reichsmarine
- Years of service: 1907–1919; 1920-1921
- Rank: Deckoffizier
- Battles/wars: World War I
- Awards: Iron Cross, 1st and 2nd class

Franz Reinhold Schwede (5 March 1888 – 19 October 1960) was a Nazi German politician, Oberbürgermeister (Lord Mayor) of Coburg and both Gauleiter and Oberpräsident of Pomerania. An early supporter of Adolf Hitler in Coburg, Schwede used intimidation and propaganda to help elect the first Nazi-majority local government in Germany. This contributed to a personality cult surrounding Schwede and he became known as "Franz Schwede-Coburg." During World War II he ordered secret executions of the infirm and mass deportations of Jews. He also played a key role in abandoning the Pomeranian civilian population to the advancing Red Army, while escaping their fate himself. In 1945 he was captured by the British Army and in 1948 he was tried and convicted of war crimes.

== Early years ==
Franz Schwede was born in the small town of Drawöhnen near Memel, East Prussia (now Dreverna in Klaipėda District Municipality, Lithuania) in 1888, when it was part of the German Empire. After attending volksschule, he worked briefly as a forester, then trained as a millwright and in 1907 joined the Imperial German Navy as a machinist in the Wilhelmshaven shipyard. He served throughout the First World War aboard many warships including the battleship SMS Prinzregent Luitpold and the light cruiser SMS Dresden. By the end of the war, he had risen to the rank of technical deck officer (Deckoffizier) and had been awarded the Iron Cross 1st and 2nd class. After the Scuttling of the German fleet at Scapa Flow in 1919, Schwede was interned in British custody as a prisoner of war.

Upon his release on 1 February 1920, he immediately joined the Reichsmarine and was assigned as an instructor at a naval school in Wilhelmshaven. However, he was discharged at the end of March 1921 when personnel limits imposed by the Versailles Treaty were reached. He then took a job as operations manager at a sawmill in Sankt Andreasberg in the Prussian Province of Hanover, before being hired as foreman at the Coburg Municipal Electrical Works in March 1922. During this period, Schwede became active in the Deutschvölkischer Schutz und Trutzbund, a Völkisch and antisemitic organization.

== Rise to power in Coburg ==
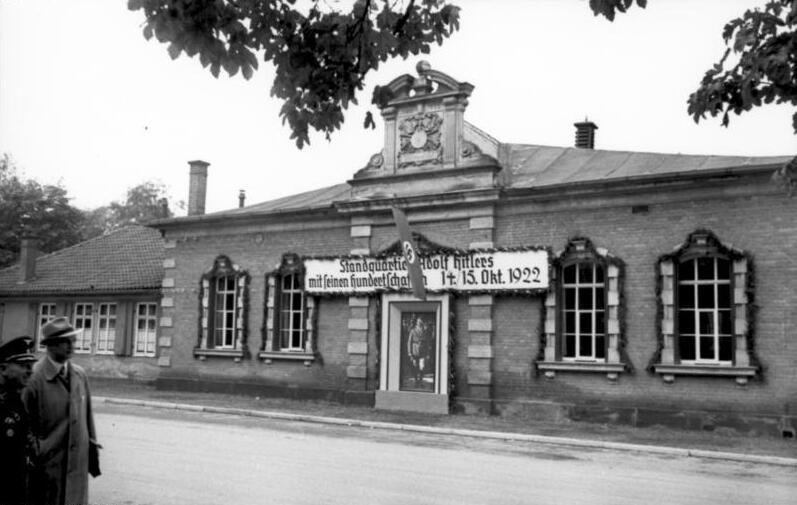
The Coburg branch office of the NSDAP pictured in 1937 on the 15th anniversary of its founding

In November 1922, Schwede joined the Nazi Party (membership number 1,581) and, in April 1923, co-founded a local group (German: NSDAP Ortsgruppe) in Coburg, a historic city in northeastern Bavaria. Under Schwede's guidance, antisemitic demonstrations and street battles instigated by the Sturmabteilung became commonplace in the city. After the Party was banned in the wake of the Beer Hall Putsch, Schwede became Kreisführer (County Leader) in Coburg for the Völkisch-Social Bloc, a Nazi front organization active in Bavaria. He also joined the National Socialist Freedom Movement, another front organization, that in the 1924 Coburg city council elections managed to get 14.3% of the vote. This entitled them to 3 seats on the Council and Schwede took one of them. Shortly after the NSDAP ban lifted, Schwede rejoined on 30 March 1925, becoming the Party Ortsgruppenleiter (local group leader) in Coburg, where there were about 800 members at that time, and the Bezirksleiter (district leader) in 1928. That year he also secured a seat on the Kreistag (district council) of Upper Franconia.

In 1926, Schede founded Der Weckruf ("The Wake-Up Call"), the first Nazi propaganda newspaper at the local level in Germany. Here he ran an extra-parliamentary opposition with lurid articles about alleged "scandals" designed to destabilize the political system of the Weimar Republic. In 1928, the paper began a slander and harassment campaign against Abraham Friedmann, the Jewish General Director of the Coburg meat company Großmann AG. Friedmann was initially successful in fighting these attacks and managed to get the City Council to fire Schwede from his job at the Municipal Works in 1929. The outraged Nazis demanded Schwede's immediate reinstatement and when the city refused a petition began circulating to dissolve the City Council. On 5 May 1929 the recall passed with 67% of the vote. In the ensuing re-election campaign, which included public speeches in Coburg by Adolf Hitler himself, the Nazis won 43.1% of the popular vote and 13 of the 25 seats in June 1929. This was the first instance where the NSDAP held an absolute majority in a local government in Germany. At the newly elected Council's opening session, Schwede was promptly rehired to the Municipal Works.

Schwede then managed to get himself elected, after the fifth try, as third deputy mayor (Bürgermeister) on 28 August 1930, becoming the first Nazi to reach such a position. In October 1930, Schwede was elected to the Bavarian Landtag, succeeding Hans Schemm, and would go on to become the chamber's First Vice-President in March 1932. Early in 1931 he was elected second Bürgermeister of Coburg and, on 16 November 1931, first Bürgermeister. Coburg became the first city in Germany to see the swastika flag raised on a public building, City Hall, which occurred on 18 January 1931 two years before Hitler came to power. Schwede also got the city to grant Hitler an honorary citizenship on 16 October 1932, also the first to do so. All this created a cult of personality around Schwede, a highlight of which was the 1933 dedication of Coburg City Hall's new bell, bearing the rhyming inscription Zu Adolf Hitler ruf ich dich, Franz Schwede-Glocke heiße ich (roughly translated "To Adolf Hitler I call, I am called the Franz Schwede Bell").

Following the Nazi seizure of power in January 1933, Schwede was directly appointed as Coburg's Lord Mayor (Oberbürgermeister). In March 1933, a terror campaign was launched under his leadership against Jews and opponents of the Nazis. By the end of April, 152 people had been arrested and harshly mistreated while in "protective custody", many in Schwede's presence. In 1939 Coburg was officially granted the title "First National Socialist City in Germany" (German: Erste nationalsozialistische Stadt Deutschlands). Schwede was also made an honorary citizen of Coburg, as Hitler had been, and was awarded use of the suffix "Coburg" in his name.

== Gauleiter of Pomerania ==
Schwede's political career continued its steady rise when, in November 1933, he was elected to the Reichstag from electoral constituency 26, Franconia. He also became a holder of the Golden Party Badge. On 1 July 1934, he was appointed Regierungspräsident (District President) of Lower Bavaria and the Upper Palatinate. Around the same time the existing Gauleiter of the Prussian Province of Pomerania, Wilhelm Karpenstein, ran afoul of NSDAP headquarters and was arrested during the Night of the Long Knives. Schwede's loyalty was rewarded when Hitler appointed him to the powerful NSDAP Gauleiter position in Pomerania on 21 July 1934 and made him Oberpräsident of the provincial government on 30 July. He succeeded Rudolf zur Bonsen in the government post, and he also became president of the Pomeranian Provincial Council. Thus Schwede united under his control the highest Party and governmental offices in the province.

Schwede moved to Stettin, forced 23 of the 27 District Kreisleiters out of office, and replaced Karpenstein's staff with loyal friends from Coburg, including: Arno Fischer as state building surveyor, Kuno Popp as Gau propaganda leader and regional representative of the Reich Ministry of Public Enlightenment and Propaganda, Alfred Seidler as Gau treasurer, Johannes Künzel as a regional representative of the German Labor Front, Emil Mazuw as SS-Stabsführer of SS District XIII Pomerania, and Werner Faber as Lord Mayor of Stettin.

On 8 November 1934, Schwede was named to the Prussian State Council; on 9 September 1935, he was made a member of the Academy for German Law; and at the March 1936 Reichstag election, he was returned from electoral constituency 6, Pomerania. He would retain all these positions until the fall of the Nazi regime. In May 1937, he was promoted to SA-Gruppenführer and, in November 1938, to SA-Obergruppenführer. That same year, he became Chairman of the Reich League of Former Professional Soldiers (German: Reichstreubundes ehemaliger Berufssoldaten). During 1938-39, the German Pomeranian province was enlarged. Most of Grenzmark Posen-West Prussia and two counties in Brandenburg were made a district, further expanding the area he controlled. During the Reichskristallnacht on 9 November 1938, Schwede oversaw the destruction of the Pomeranian synagogues. The next day, all male Stettin Jews were deported to Oranienburg concentration camp and kept there for several weeks in order to increase the level of terror.

== World War II and war crimes ==
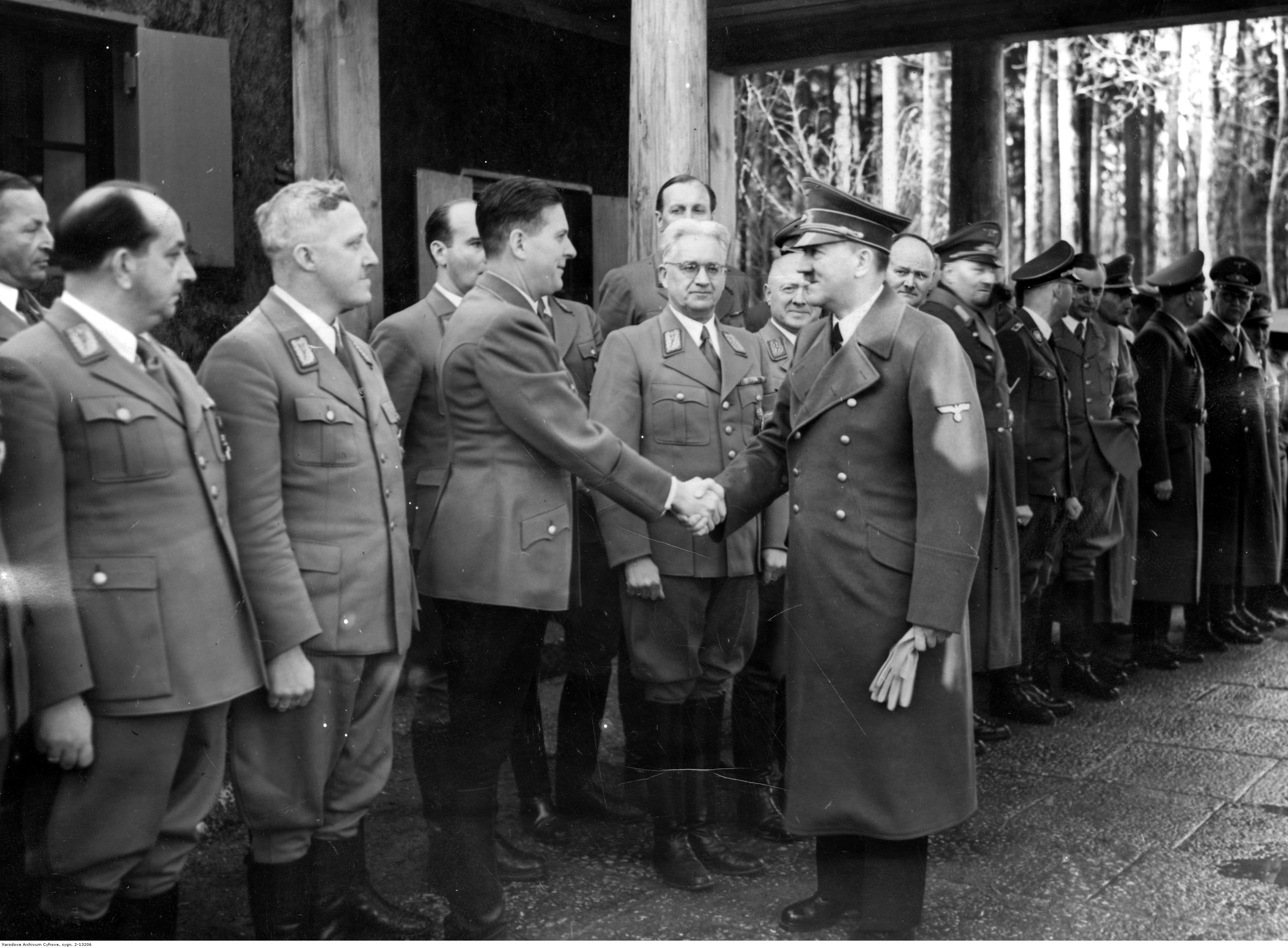
Hitler meeting with Gauleiters in 1943. Schwede is in the background to Henrich Himmler's right.

At the outbreak of World War II, Hitler gave some Gauleiters increased power over civil defense matters and Schwede was appointed Reich Defense Commissioner (German: Reichsverteidigungskommissar) for Wehrkreis (Military District) II, which included his Gau Pomerania in addition to neighboring Gau Mecklenburg. Civil administration and important industrial sectors were now subject to his direct control. Starting in October 1939, Schwede – or "Nero" as the Pomeranians nicknamed him – used this position to sweep Pomerania with an iron broom. He worked closely with the SS to make way for the resettlement of ethnic Germans arriving from the Baltic States.

After learning of the Aktion T4 program, Schwede immediately ordered the evacuation of psychiatric hospitals and nursing homes in Treptow, Ueckermünde, Lauenburg, Meseritz-Obrawalde and Stralsund. Some 1400 patients were transported to Neustadt in Westpreußen to be shot by SS-Kommando Eimann or murdered by Sonderkommando Lange in gas vans. The mental sanitorium in Meseritz-Obrawalde then was converted into an Aktion T4 center and it is estimated that over 10,000 handicapped persons were killed there. The Director of the facility, Walter Grabowski, was appointed to his post by Schwede in November 1941. On 12 and 13 February 1940, the remaining 1,000 to 1,300 Pomeranian Jews, regardless of sex, age and health, were deported from Stettin and Schneidemühl to the Lublin-Lipowa Reservation that had been set up following the Nisko Plan, to their ultimate demise.

On 16 November 1942, the jurisdiction of the Reich Defense Commissioners was changed from the Wehrkreis to the Gau level, and Schwede remained Commissioner only for Gau Pomerania. In 1943 Pomerania became a target of allied air raids and throughout 1944 and early 1945 Stettin's industrial and residential areas were hit. Despite this, the province was regarded as "safe" compared to other parts of the Third Reich and it became a shelter for evacuees from hard hit Berlin and the industrial areas of western Germany. On 25 September 1944, Schwede was made commander of the Nazi Volkssturm forces in his Gau. Hastily organized and poorly equipped, his units had the third worst casualty figures in the Reich.

Pomerania finally turned into a battlefield on 26 January 1945, when Red Army tanks entered the province near Schneidemühl during the East Pomeranian Offensive. Schwede believed in victory up until the very end, so evacuation orders for the civilian population were issued either too late or not at all. He even ordered authorities to repel any flight attempts as "defeatist". However, even as the Soviets advanced, he managed to get himself onto a ship out of Sassnitz on 4 March 1945 in time to escape towards the direction of Schleswig-Holstein. The official post-war West German Schieder commission estimated civilian losses in Schwede's province at 440,000 dead.

== Imprisonment and death ==
On 13 May 1945, Schwede was captured by the British Army and once again ended up in custody as a prisoner of war. Interned until 1947, he underwent denazification procedures. He was tried for war crimes in a Bielefeld court and on 25 November 1948 sentenced to nine years in prison for membership in the SA-Führerkorps. On 7 April 1951 a court in Coburg sentenced him to another ten years' imprisonment on 52 counts of abuse of power and grievous bodily harm that he participated in during the terrors of March, 1933. His sentence was commuted to probation on 24 January 1956 on grounds of ill health and he died four years later at the age of 72 in Coburg.

== See also ==
- History of Pomerania (1933–1945)

== Sources ==
- Carl-Christian H. Dressel: Anmerkungen zur Justiz in Coburg von der Errichtung des Landgerichts Coburg bis zur Entnazifizierung. In: Jahrbuch der Coburger Landesstiftung 1997, Coburg 1997.
- Kyra T. Inachin: Der Gau Pommern. Eine preußische Provinz als NS-Gau. In: Jürgen John, Horst Möller, Thomas Schaarschmidt (Hrsg.): Die NS-Gaue. Regionale Mittelinstanzen im zentralistischen "Führerstaat“. München 2007, S. 280–293.
- Joachim Lilla, Martin Döring, Andreas Schulz: Statisten in Uniform Droste, Düsseldorf 2004, ISBN 3-7700-5254-4.
- Miller, Michael D.; Schulz, Andreas (2021). Gauleiter: The Regional Leaders of the Nazi Party and Their Deputies, 1925 - 1945. Vol. 3 (Fritz Sauckel - Hans Zimmermann). Fonthill Media. ISBN 978-1-781-55826-3.
