= Wilhelm Karpenstein =

German lawyer and Nazi Party politician (1903–1968)

Gauleiter of Gau Pomerania
- In office 1 April 1931 – 21 July 1934
- Appointed by: Adolf Hitler
- Preceded by: Walther von Corswant
- Succeeded by: Franz Schwede-Coburg

Personal details
- Born: 24 May 1903 Frankfurt am Main, Kingdom of Prussia, German Empire
- Died: 2 May 1968 (aged 64) Lauterbach, Hesse, West Germany
- Party: Nazi Party
- Other political affiliations: German Völkisch Freedom Party
- Education: University of Greifswald
- Profession: Lawyer
- Awards: Golden Party Badge

Military service
- Allegiance: Nazi Germany
- Branch/service: German Army
- Years of service: 1942–1945
- Rank: Leutnant
- Unit: Flak Detachment 403
- Battles/wars: World War II

Wilhelm Karpenstein (24 May 1903 – 2 May 1968) was a German lawyer and Nazi Party politician. He served as Gauleiter of Pomerania from 1931 to 1934. He was dismissed from his posts and expelled from the Party in July 1934 due to charges that he was involved in the Röhm Putsch. Under house arrest for two years, he then worked as a lawyer and served as an officer in the German Army during the Second World War. Interned by the Allies until 1947, he underwent a denazification process and returned to the practice of law.

== Early years ==
Wilhelm Karpenstein was born the son of a train inspector in Frankfurt am Main. After working briefly as a miner, he began studying law at the University of Frankfurt am Main. In 1923, he transferred to the University of Greifswald in the Prussian Province of Pomerania.

Karpenstein joined the Nazi Party as early as 1921 and started working to build up the party in the province. In 1923, with the Nazi Party banned, Karpenstein joined the German Völkisch Freedom Party. In 1924 Karpenstein became the editor of the Norddeutscher Beobachter (North German Observer) the first National Socialist newspaper in Pomerania. In 1925 Karpenstein returned to Hesse (Darmstadt) for four years, working as a law clerk.

== Nazi career ==
On 31 August 1925 Karpenstein joined the re-founded Nazi Party (membership number 17,333). As an early Party member, he later would be awarded the Golden Party Badge. He served as the Party Ortsgruppenleiter (Local Group Leader) for Darmstadt for the next four years. In 1929, after passing the bar exam, Karpenstein returned to Greifswald where he worked as a lawyer. He was also appointed Nazi Kreisleiter (County Leader) for Greifswald. On 9 September 1930, he was elected to the Reichstag for electoral constituency 6, Pomerania. The following year, he became the editor of the Pommerschen Zeitung, a National Socialist newspaper.

On 1 April 1931, Karpenstein was appointed Gauleiter of Pomerania to succeed Walther von Corswant. After the Nazis came to power a significant amount of autonomy lay with the Gauleiters, and their radicalism threatened to disrupt the relationship between Adolf Hitler and the middle classes that had helped to ensure Nazi electoral strength. Karpenstein did not present this problem, as he was conservative and pro-middle class. Despite not holding left-wing economic ideas himself, Karpenstein was too weak to control the dissident sentiments emerging from the Sturmabteilung (SA) in Pomerania, which was one of their power bases. However, he sought every opportunity to increase his personal power by seeking to make all of the churches, government officials and media outlets in Pomerania answerable to him directly.

In addition to his party post, Karpenstein also occupied many governmental positions. In March 1933, he was named a member of the Pomeranian Provincial Landtag, and he also served on the Pomeranian Provincial Council. He also was one of the Prussian representatives to the Reichsrat until its abolition on 14 February 1934. In September 1933 he became a member of the Prussian State Council . However, unlike many other Gauleiters, Karpenstein did not succeed in obtaining the office of Provincial Oberpräsident, after the removal of Carl von Halfern on 1 October 1933.

Karpenstein's career ended abruptly in July 1934. Charges of involvement in the Röhm Putsch, of homosexuality and of repeated noncompliance with orders issued by the Party leadership were brought against him. Following a hearing by the Supreme Party Court, Karpenstein was deposed as Gauleiter of Pomerania in favor of Franz Schwede-Coburg on 21 July 1934 and expelled from the party. His lack of direct involvement with the SA probably saved him from being killed. Ostensibly, however, Karpenstein was dismissed for his supposed links to Gregor Strasser and his failure to work with Hermann Göring.

== Later years ==
Karpenstein was arrested by the Gestapo and held under house arrest from October 1934 to July 1936, when he was pardoned and released, with the condition that he never live in Pomerania. Karpenstein worked as a lawyer in Berlin from 1936. During the Second World War he went into the military, where he attained the rank of Leutnant. His requests for political rehabilitation were denied.

After the war, Karpenstein was interned by the Allied authorities until 1947, then categorized by a German denazification court as a "lesser offender". He then worked in commercial enterprises until 1954 when he was again admitted to the bar. He died on 2 May 1968.
