= Theodor Vahlen =

German mathematician and Nazi Party official (1869–1945)

Karl Theodor Vahlen
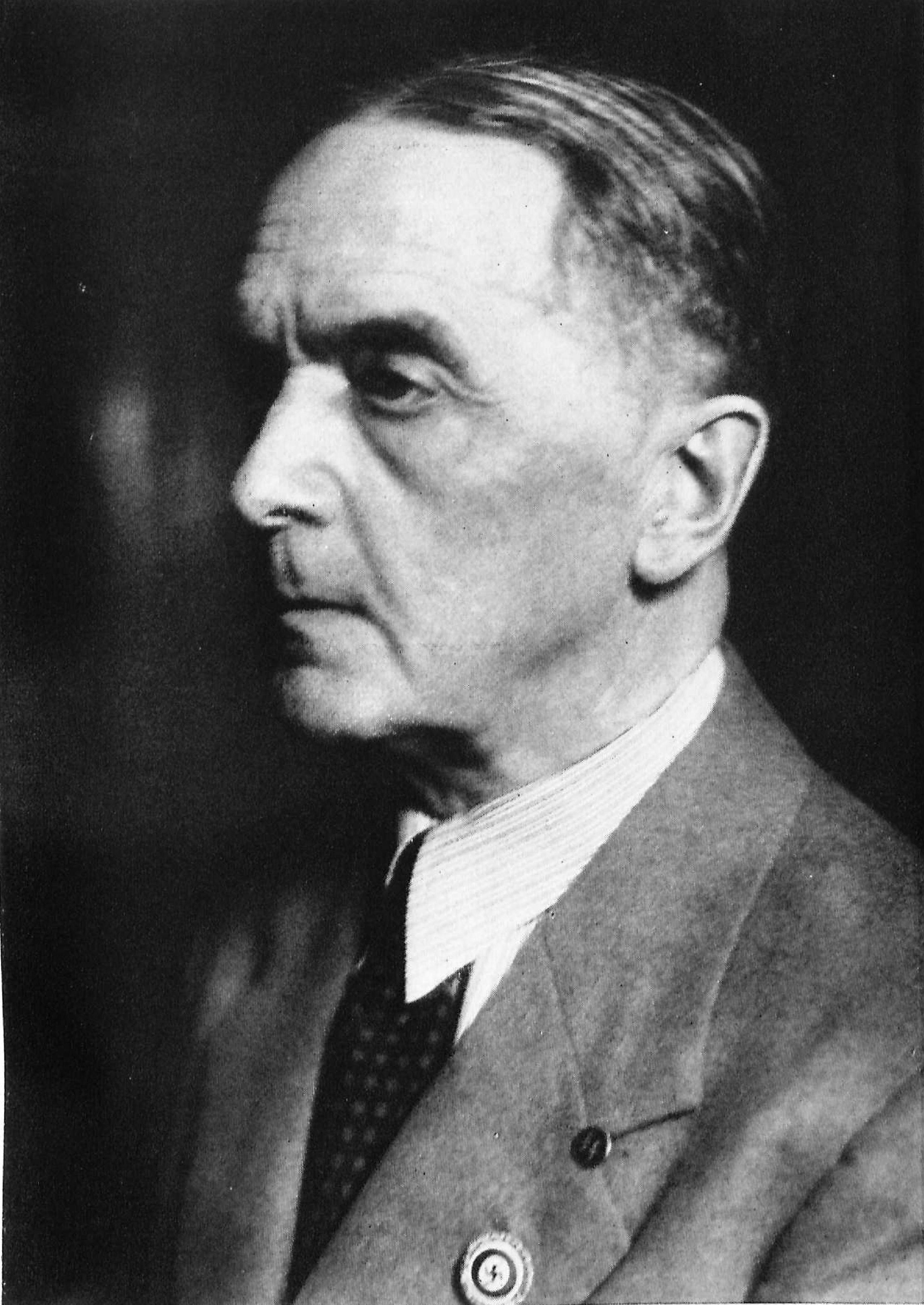

Gauleiter of Gau Pomerania
- In office 22 March 1925 – 21 August 1927
- Preceded by: Position established
- Succeeded by: Walther von Corswant

Ministerial Director Reich Ministry of Science, Education and Culture
- In office 1 June 1934 – 1 January 1937

President Prussian Academy of Science
- In office 1 January 1939 – 1 April 1943

Personal details
- Born: 30 June 1869 Vienna, Austria-Hungary
- Died: 16 November 1945 (aged 76) Štěchovice, Czechoslovakia
- Education: University of Berlin
- Profession: Professor
- Known for: Journal editor Deutsche Mathematik
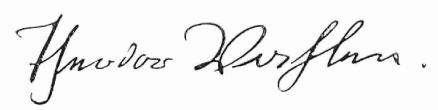
- Signature

Military service
- Allegiance: German Empire
- Branch/service: Imperial German Army
- Years of service: 1914–1918
- Rank: Major
- Unit: 68th (6th Royal Saxon) Field Artillery Regiment
- Battles/wars: World War I
- Awards: Iron Cross, 1st class and 2nd class

Karl Theodor Vahlen (30 June 1869 – 16 November 1945) was a German mathematician and leading representative of National Socialist German mathematics ("Deutsche Mathematik"). A member of the Nazi Party, he served as the first Gauleiter of Pomerania and was a member of both the SA and SS.

== Early years ==
Theodor Vahlen was born in Vienna, the son of a German classical philologist Johannes Vahlen (1830–1911). He went to volksschule and gymnasium in Berlin before studying mathematics at the University of Berlin and receiving his doctorate there in 1893. From 1893, Vahlen was a Privatdozent in mathematics at the Königsberg Albertina University. In 1904, he began teaching at the University of Greifswald, and in 1911 he became an ordinarius professor there. He entered military service at the beginning of World War I with the rank of Hauptmann in the 68th (6th Royal Saxon) Field Artillery Regiment. He was an artillery battery commander on the western front (1914–1915) and the eastern front (1916–1917). Wounded in action on three occasions, he earned the Iron Cross, first and second class. He left the service on 30 September 1918 with the rank of Major of the reserves. He returned to teaching at the University of Greifswald.

== Political career ==
Vahlen in 1919 initially became a member of the German National People's Party (DNVP). He co-founded a völkische group in Pomerania in 1922. In November 1923, he and his wife joined the Nazi Party (NSDAP) just before it was outlawed as a result of the Beer Hall Putsch. He then joined the National Socialist Freedom Party, a Nazi front organization, becoming its Gauleiter in Pomerania on 4 April 1924. In May 1924, under its auspices, he was elected to the Reichstag for electoral constituency 6 (Pomerania). From mid-1924 through September 1926, he was the co-publisher of the daily newspaper Norddeutscher Beobachter (North German Observer).

When the ban on the Nazi Party was lifted, Gregor Strasser, Hitler's authorized representative for northern Germany, selected him to be the first Party Gauleiter for Gau Pomerania on 22 March 1925 and Hitler confirmed this appointment. Vahlen formally rejoined the Party on 11 May (membership number 3,961). In December 1925, Vahlen joined the National Socialist Working Association, a group of north and northwest German Gauleiters closely associated with Strasser. On 1 March 1926, Vahlen joined Strasser and his brother Otto Strasser in founding the publishing house Kampf-Verlag in Berlin.

By 1927, Adolf Hitler was replacing many early Party leaders whom he considered not to have the attributes to be effective party administrators. Consequently, Vahlen was placed on indefinite leave on 1 May 1927 and his newly appointed Deputy, Walther von Corswant, was effectively put in charge. On 21 August, Vahlen was finally dismissed and Corswant officially became Gauleiter.

Also in May 1927, Vahlen faced disciplinary actions stemming from an incident a few years earlier when he was Rector at the University of Greifswald. On 11 August 1924, Constitution Day, Vahlen had incited a crowd at the university against the Weimar Republic, which resulted in taking down the flags of the Republic and the Free State of Prussia. The university suspended him for political abuse of his function, and in May 1927 he was dismissed without a pension. Upon his dismissal, Friedrich Schmidt-Ott increased the funding Vahlen had been receiving for his work for the German Navy since 1922. Vahlen worked briefly as an assistant in Johannes Stark's private physics laboratory. In 1930 Vahlen returned to his birthplace and became a lecturer of mathematics at the Technische Hochschule Wien.

Once Hitler became Chancellor of Germany on 30 January 1933, Vahlen's career again gained momentum and flourished in Germany as a result of his support for the NSDAP. In that year, he became an ordinarius professor of mathematics at the Humboldt University of Berlin, as successor to Richard Edler von Mises, who emigrated from Germany as a result of the Law for the Restoration of the Professional Civil Service, which was in part directed against professors with Jewish ancestry, which von Mises had. After 1933, Vahlen was a strong advocate of Deutsche Mathematik, a parallel movement to Deutsche Physik, advocated by the Nobel Laureate physicists Philipp Lenard and Johannes Stark; both movements were anti-Semitic. From 1934, he was ordinarius professor at the University of Berlin, a position he held until attaining emeritus status in 1937.

In July 1933 Vahlen joined the Sturmabteilung (SA) but on 10 July 1936 he switched to the Schutzstaffel (SS) with the rank of Sturmbannführer and was assigned to the SS Main Office. On 30 January 1938 he was attached to the staff of the Reichsführer-SS. He received successive promotions, the last being to SS-Brigadeführer on 9 November 1943.

During the period 1933 to 1937, Vahlen served as third vice president of the Kaiser-Wilhelm Gesellschaft. In January 1934 he became an employee in the University Department of the Prussian Ministry of Science, Art and Public Education, and by 26 April he was head of the department. From 1 June 1934, he was a Ministerial Director and Chief of the Science Office at the Reich Ministry of Science, Education and Culture. Actually, the Science Office was split into two components, WI, a continuation of the Prussian department, and WII, the army office for research. Vahlen was head of WI, but, in actuality, the deputy chief, the chemist Franz Bachér ran WI. From this position, in 1936, Vahlen began publishing the journal Deutsche Mathematik, for which the Berlin mathematician Ludwig Bieberbach was the editor; in the journal, political articles preceded the scholarly articles. On 1 January 1937 Vahlen was relieved of his duties at the Ministry at his own request. Through a manipulation of the election process by Vahlen and his supporters, he was selected as president of the Prussian Academy of Sciences effective 1 January 1939 and remained in this post until 1 April 1943. In April 1944, Vahlen moved to Vienna after his Berlin apartment was destroyed in an air raid and again taught at the Technische Hochschule Wien. In August 1944 he moved to Prague and worked as a lecturer at the Charles University. At the end of the war in May 1945 he was imprisoned, and he died in Czech custody in November 1945.

== Mathematics ==
Vahlen gained his doctorate with Beiträge zu einer additiven Zahlentheorie, and continued to specialise in number theory, but later turned to applied mathematics.

Theodor Vahlen was an early proponent of geometric algebra. His 1902 paper in Mathematische Annalen recounts William Kingdon Clifford's construction of his 2^{n} dimensional algebra with n − 1 anti-commuting square roots of −1. Vahlen also recounts split-biquaternions and parabolic biquaternions originated by Clifford. But Vahlen cites Eduard Study most of all since Study also focussed on the geometric motions (translation and rotation) as implicit in algebra. Since Vahlen explores some of the linear fractional transformations of Clifford algebras, he is sometimes remembered for the Vahlen matrices. These are $2\times 2$ matrices with coefficients in a Clifford algebra that act on a projective line over a ring. In 1985, Lars Ahlfors recalled the article as follows: "The method was introduced as early as 1901 by K.T. Vahlen in a rather short, but remarkable, paper. His motivation was to unify the theory of motions in Euclidean, hyperbolic, and elliptic space, which is obviously in the spirit of Clifford. In this respect the paper seems somewhat antiquated, but the essence is in the method it advocates." The subject of relativity was a polemical issue in Nazi Germany. As Mark Walker writes

Eventually Vahlen adopted the common tactic of ascribing the theory of relativity to other "Aryan" physicists, thereby accusing Einstein of plagiarism, but also making the theory palatable to the National Socialist state.

== Works ==
- 1899: "Rationale Funktion der Wurzeln, symmetrische und Affektfunktionen", (i.e. "Rational functions of roots, symmetric and effect-functions") Klein's encyclopedia, 1–1.
- 1900: "Arithmetische Theorie der Formen", (i.e. "Arithmetic Theory of Forms") Klein's encyclopedia, Volume 1–2
- 1902: "Über Bewegungen und complexe Zahlen", (i.e. "On Motions and Complex Numbers") Mathematische Annalen 55:585–93
- 1905: Abstrakte Geometrie. Untersuchungen über die Grundlagen der euklidischen und nicht-euklidischen Geometrie, (i.e. Arithmetic Geometry. Studies of the Foundations of Euclidean and Non-Euclidean Geometry), Leipzig, 2nd edition 1940, Deutsche Mathematik, 2nd supplement
- 1911: Konstruktionen und Approximationen in systematischer Darstellung, (i.e. Systematic Representations of Constructions and Approximations) Teubner
- 1922: Ballistik (i.e. Ballistics) de Gruyter 2nd edition 1942
- 1929: Deviation und Kompensation, (i.e. Deviation and Compensation) Vieweg-Verlag
- 1942: "Die Paradoxien der relativen Mechanik", (i.e. "Paradoxes of relative mechanics") Leipzig, Deutsche Mathematik, 3rd supplement

== Bibliography ==
- Beyerchen, Alan D. (1977) Scientists Under Hitler: Politics and the Physics Community in the Third Reich (Yale) ISBN 0-300-01830-4
- Hentschel, Klaus, editor and Ann M. Hentschel, editorial assistant and Translator (1996) Physics and National Socialism: An Anthology of Primary Sources (Birkhäuser) ISBN 0-8176-5312-0
- Höffkes, Karl (1986). Hitlers Politische Generale. Die Gauleiter des Dritten Reiches: ein biographisches Nachschlagewerk. Tübingen: Grabert-Verlag. ISBN 3-87847-163-7.
- Macrakis, Kristie (1993) Surviving the Swastika: Scientific Research in Nazi Germany (Oxford) ISBN 0-19-507010-0
- Miller, Michael D.; Schulz, Andreas (2021). Gauleiter: The Regional Leaders of the Nazi Party and Their Deputies, 1925 - 1945. Vol. 3 (Fritz Sauckel - Hans Zimmermann). Fonthill Media. ISBN 978-1-781-55826-3.
- Orlow, Dietrich (1969). The History of the Nazi Party: 1919-1933. University of Pittsburgh Press. ISBN 0-8229-3183-4.
