= Bezirksleiter =

Bezirksleiter armband, 1930–33

Bezirksleiter (District Leader) was a Nazi Party title which was used in the early years of the Party's existence, beginning around 1926.

== History ==
The position of Bezirksleiter was originally established around 1926 as the next higher organizational official overseeing several local branches (Ortsgruppen) of the Party. As such, the Bezirksleiter served as the intermediary between the local Party heads (Ortsgruppenleiter) and the head of the Gau organization (Gauleiter). The number of Bezirkleiters in each Gau, if any, depended on the size of the Gau, and their jurisdictions were not necessarily coterminous with existing governmental units.

At a January 1929 Party Conference held in Weimar, Gregor Strasser, the Reichsorganisationsleiter, authorized the Gauleiters to subdivide their Gaue into districts if the organizational strength of the Gau justified this change. The subdivisions were based on the Kreis, the standard administrative unit existing in the German States, roughly analogous to a county. With this organizational restructuring, the Bezirksleiter began to be phased out, to be replaced by the Kreisleiter as the standardized intermediate administrative level between the Gauleitung (Gau leadership) and the local Party branches.

Many of the early Bezirksleiters advanced to the position of Gauleiter, such as Franz Schwede, Gustav Simon, Jakob Sprenger, Josef Terboven and Karl Wahl to name but a few.
