= Bandelin =

- Municipality
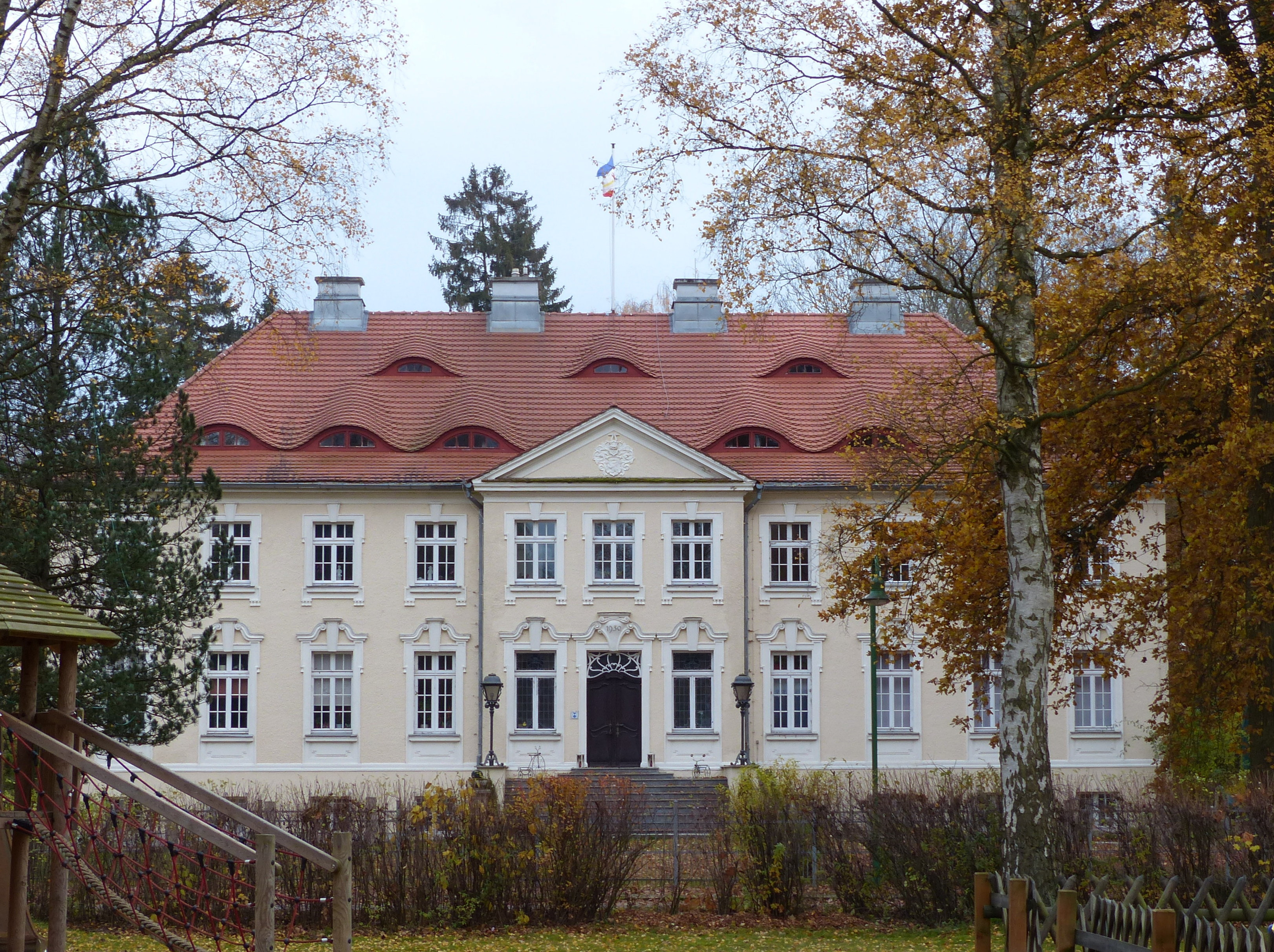
- Gutshaus Bandelin in Bandelin

- Location of Bandelin within Vorpommern-Greifswald district
- Interactive map of Bandelin
- Location within Germany Location within Mecklenburg-Vorpommern
- Coordinates: 53°58′N 13°23′E
- Country: Germany
- State: Mecklenburg-Vorpommern
- District: Vorpommern-Greifswald
- Municipal assoc.: Züssow
- Subdivisions: 4 Ortsteile

Government
  - Mayor: Jana von Behren

Area
  - Total: 16.98 km^{2} (6.56 sq mi)
- Elevation: 22 m (72 ft)

Population (2025-12-31)
  - Total: 566
  - Density: 33.3/km^{2} (86.3/sq mi)
- Time zone: UTC+01:00 (CET)
  - Summer (DST): UTC+02:00 (CEST)
- Postal codes: 17506
- Dialling codes: 038353
- Vehicle registration: VG
- Website: www.gemeinde-bandelin.de

Bandelin is a municipality in the Vorpommern-Greifswald district, in Mecklenburg-Vorpommern, Germany, consisting of the villages Kuntzow, Schmoldow, Vargatz, and Bandelin.

== Location ==
Bandelin is about 15 km south of Greifswald and approximately 3 km northwest of Gützkow.
