= Unieszyno =

- Village
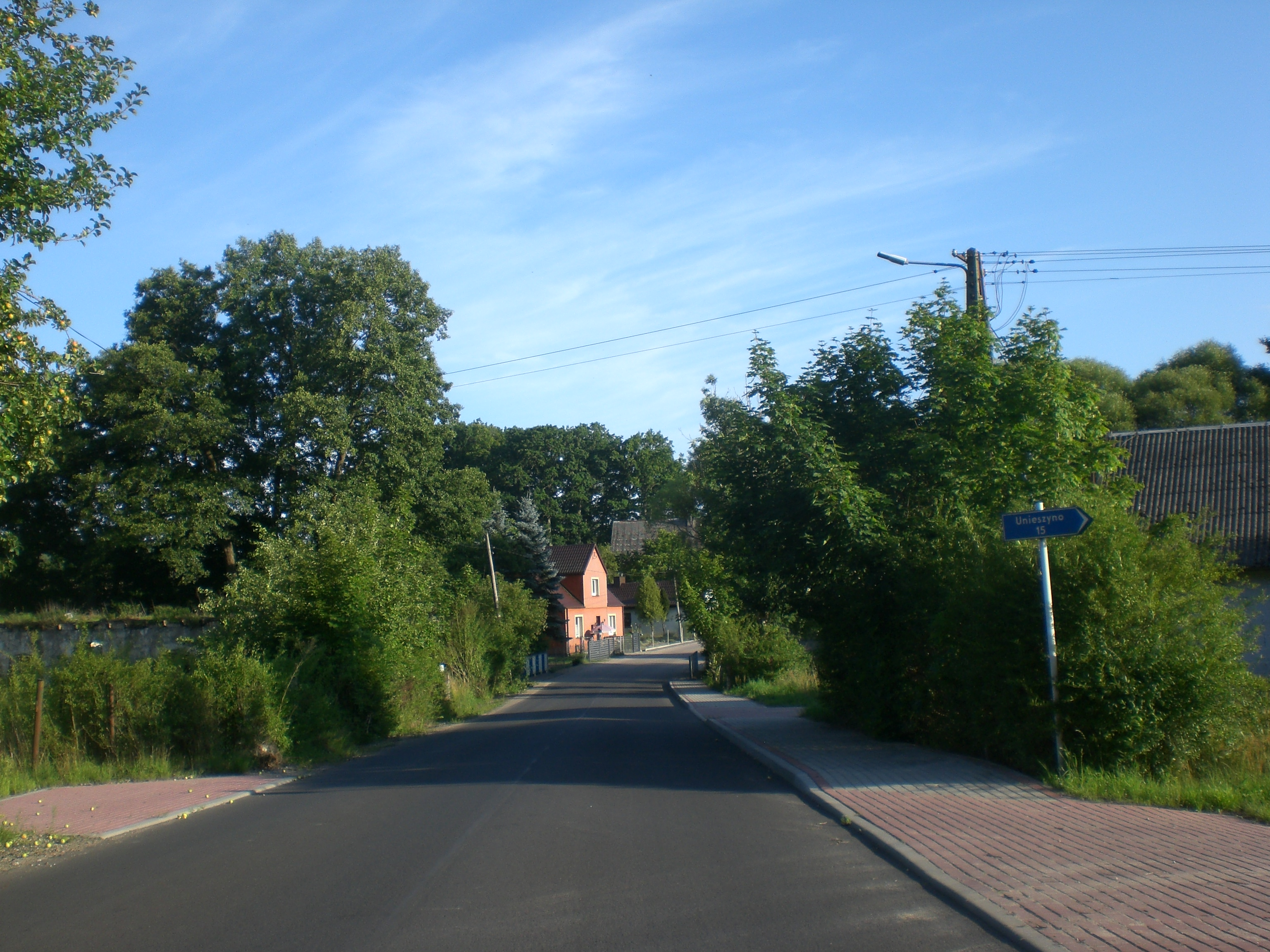
- The village of Unieszyno

- Location within Poland
- Coordinates: 54°27′N 17°38′E
- Country: Poland
- Voivodeship: Pomeranian
- County: Lębork
- Gmina: Cewice

Unieszyno [uɲɛˈʂɨnɔ] (German: Wunneschin) is a village in the administrative district of Gmina Cewice, within Lębork County, Pomeranian Voivodeship, in northern Poland.

For details of the history of the region, see History of Pomerania.
