= Stalag Luft II =

Prisoner of war camp established during World War II

- Łódź, German-occupied Poland
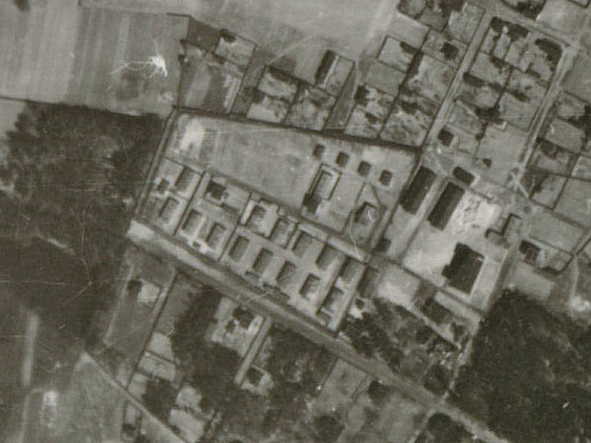
- Aerial view of Stalag Luft II in 1942

Site information
- Type: Prisoner-of-war camp
- Controlled by: Nazi Germany

Location
- Coordinates: 51.715°N 19.4211°E

Site history
- In use: 1941–1944
- Battles/wars: World War II

Garrison information
- Occupants: Soviet and probably French prisoners of war

Stalag Luft II (German: Stammlager Luft II; literally "Main Camp, Air, II"; SL II) was a Luftwaffe-run prisoner-of-war (POW) camp during World War II, in Łódź, in the occupied territory of Poland.

The camp was in the 21st Military District of the Oberkommando der Wehrmacht (OKW; Supreme Command [German] Armed Forces, which supervised all POW camps in the Reich area and the areas of the General Government, Commissariats of the Reich in the East, Norway, Belgium, and the occupied part of France), administered by the Luftwaffe, which had its small network of camps for captive-aviators.

It operated from February 1, 1941 to September 1, 1944, in the Litzmannstadt district – Erzhausen (a district of Łódź called Ruda Pabianicka, (Note: Before the Second World War Ruda Pabianicka was a separate city (from 1923). January 1940 was incorporated by the German invader into the Litzmannstadt area (Łódź) as the so-called "outer district" called Erzhausen.) in the south-western area of the city), in the area within the current streets: Odrzańska (German: Wallensteinerstrasse; south-west), Retmańska (German: Paracelsusweg, from the north-west), Łopianowa (German: Schwertbrüderstrasse, from north-east) and Zuchów (German: Goldene Pforte, from the south-east).

== History ==
Before placing Soviet prisoners of war in the camp, it probably detained French prisoners. The daily number of Soviet prisoners ranged from around 400 to slightly over 1,000 people.

In March 1942, its commandant was Hauptmann Maldbenden and the commandant of the guard service was Kirstein Kos.

Compared to other Russian prison camps, for example the Auschwitz or Mauthausen-Gusen concentration camps, Stalag Luft II's conditions were moderately harsh.

Initially, bodies of dead prisoners were buried near the camp, most likely in the woods behind the northern fence. Next, they were buried in the Cemetery of the Doly in Lódz and the Orthodox cemetery on "Dolach" at Telefoniczna. These tombs have never been marked and their exact locations in each cemetery are unknown. The cemetery records held by the parish of St. Alexander Nevsky in Łódź also contain no information about the graves of these prisoners. Efforts by the Institute of National Remembrance to place a stone or plaque in the cemetery to mark these unmarked graves have been unsuccessful.

Some of the prisoners worked in textile or leather factories in Łódź (including the "Gentelman" factory at the intersection of the current streets of B. Limanowskiego and Aleja Włókniarzy, commonly referred to as the "rubber band"). Prisoners also worked on the construction of the reloading station in Olechów. In workplaces, outside the station in Olechów where it was impossible, help was provided by Poles, giving food and cigarettes. Some prisoners also worked on the construction of an underground hospital (525 m^{2}, with a capacity of 1600 m³) for the nearby Lublinek airport on the corner of ul. Pabianicka and ul. Evangelic (west corner).

Formally, Stalag Luft II was liquidated on September 1, 1944, when most of the prisoners were deported to Stalag Luft III in Żagań. Only a group of prisoners who were sick and unable to work remained in Łódź, most of whom lived to see the arrival of the Soviet Red Army on January 19, 1945.

October 8, 1944 A group of Polish insurgents from Warsaw was temporarily placed in the Stalag barracks and were then taken away to Stalag IV-B-Zeithain in Zeithain.

After the end of the German occupation in Łódź (January 19, 1945), a camp for German POW's was set up around March–April 1945, in the Stalag barracks, which operated until around 1948.

The area of the camp is visible on German aerial photographs taken over Łódź in May 1942.

== Escapes ==
The first attempt to escape likely took place at the turn of 1941/1942. Its first stage lasted from December 1941 to January 1942. At that time, a group of prisoners excavated a tunnel under the uninhabited block No. 14, standing at the northern fence of the camp, to a small forest outside the stalagium located at a distance of about 25 m. The escape was to take place in the spring of 1942. Due to the shallowness of the excavation, during the spring thaw, the guard made a raid in him. The Germans found on him the things of one of the prisoners, and this allowed them to reach the organizers, including Yuriy Curkan (Юрий Цуркан), who had been imprisoned in the Stalag since October 29, 1941. All of the organizers were first imprisoned and subjected to brutal interrogation, and then transported to Stalag Luft VI in Šilutė in German-occupied Lithuania. In 1967, Curkan published his memoirs, which included his stay at Stalag Luft II.

On October 9, 1942, the successful escape of two aviation officers, Aleksander Kuzniecow and Arkady Vorozcow, took place. They escaped while working in one of the factories in Łódź. By coincidence, they came across communists from the Łódź Polish Workers' Party, who took care of them. While remaining in hiding, they joined the conspiratorial work, beginning by editing "Peperian" newspapers based on Russian radio listening. After a few months, Kuznetsov, threatened with arrest, was included in the first Łódź partisan detachment People's Guard, known today as the "Radiant". With him, he took part in the skirmish at Głowno on May 8, 1943, which ended with the division of the unit. He survived, thanks to the help of the inhabitants of the village Stary Waliszew. Later, with the help of Warsaw communists, he came to Warsaw and from there to partisan units in the Lublin region, where he saw the entrance of the Red Army. Vorozcow was arrested in Łódź at the end of April 1943. After many months of investigation, he was sent to Auschwitz concentration camp, where he received the number 188 052. In July 1944, he was deported to transport of 400 passengers to KL Mauthausen-Gusen in Austria and there he survived until the liberation of the camp on May 5, 1945.

== Post-war investigation of the camp ==
The issue of the operation of POW camps in Łódź, including Stalag Luft II, is in the interest of the District Commission for the Investigation of Nazi Crimes – the Institute of National Remembrance in Łódź. Here, too, there are materials collected during the investigation. However, they have a historical rather than a procedural character.

The first investigation of Stalag Luft II was carried out in April 1948. Eight people were interrogated at that time. Also, the site of the former camp was inspected, situational plans were made, and several photographs were taken, after which the investigation was discontinued. It resumed after the reactivation of the District Commission in Łódź, giving the investigation to the OKŁ, 60/67, "Investigating the crimes committed by the Nazis in 1941–1945 in the camp for Soviet prisoners of war in Lodz". It lasted until December 1977 and ended with a suspension due to no further opportunities to collect evidence that brings new facts, not establishing the perpetrators of war crimes and the possibility of conducting further work outside of the proceedings.

== Commemoration ==
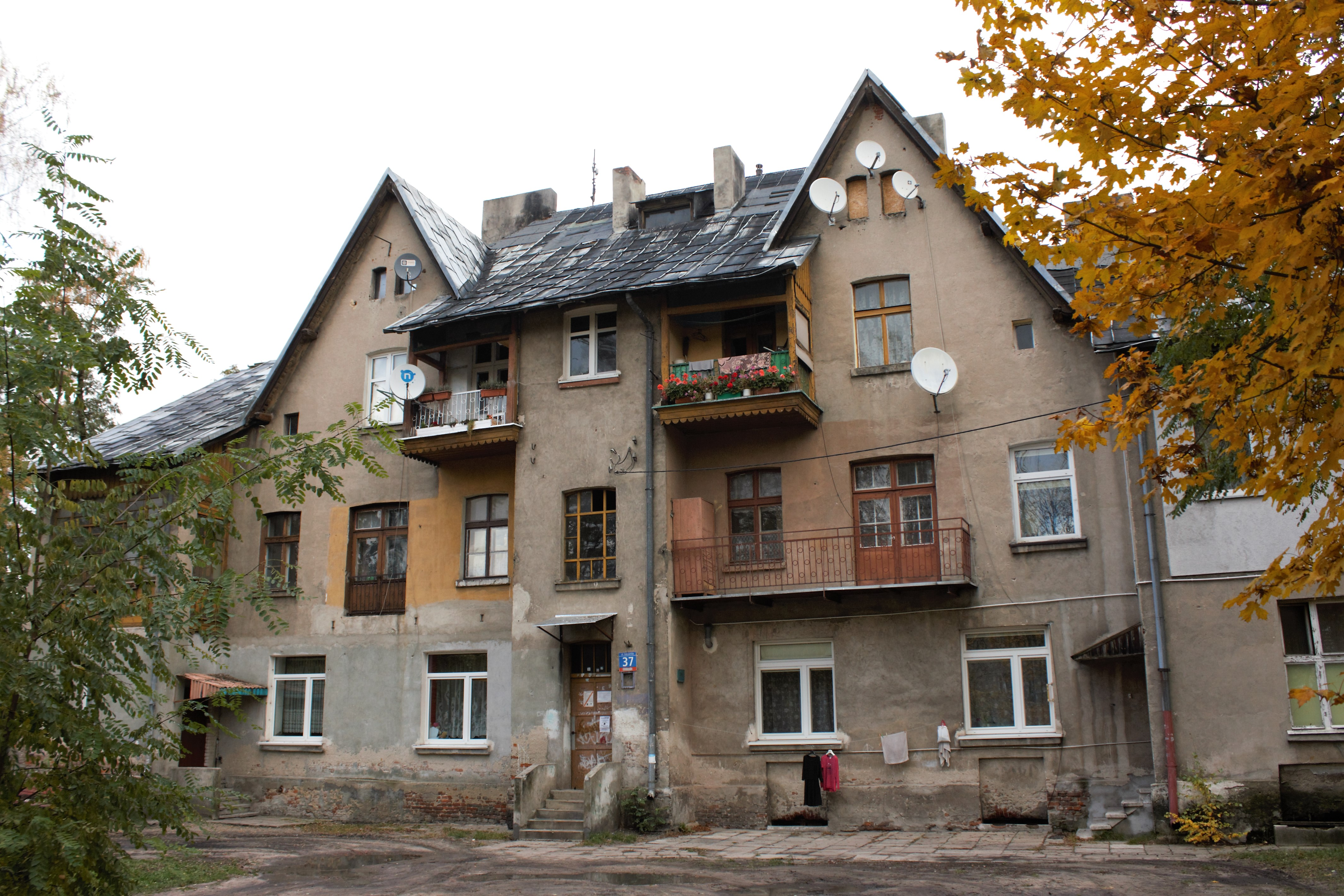
Former seat of the commandant of Stalag Luft II, now a tenement house

The area of the former stalag is not commemorated, although several of its buildings have survived (including the building of the commandant of the stalag, Lager-Kommandantur, at 37 Odrzańska Street). Actions taken in this case in January 1989 by the District Committee No. 20 "Odrzańska" (St. Dubois 10 St.), with the approval of the Voivodship Civil Committee for the Protection of the Memory of Struggle and Martyrdom, have not been realized. At the beginning of 2014, another attempt was made to commemorate this place, this time by the Civic Committee for Commemoration of the Camp, chosen from the Society of Friends of Rudy Pabianicka and from the Society of Rudy Pabianicka Sympathizers, aimed at setting the corner at ul. Odrzańska and Zuchów stone with an appropriate memorial and information board. The coordinator of the initial organizational activities was the Department of the History of Occupation in Łódź and the Łódź District Museum of Independence Traditions in Łódź, which for years has been collecting all historical information about this camp.

In the collection of the Lodz Museum of Independence Traditions there is a reconstruction of the camp plan made in 1961 by a resident of this area and wooden decorative plate signed "Stalag Luft 2 – Litzmannstadt – 1942". Also, in the collection of World War II Department of this museum, there are unregistered materials regarding Sasha Kuznetsov (mainly scans of his occupation documents and photos).

In the Russian Internet base "Memorial" of the Ministry of Defense of the Russian Federation, containing the names of Russian soldiers, among others killed during World War II, contains pieces of information on some 150 prisoners of Stalag with scans of their personal cards.

== See also ==
Stalag Luft III

Stalag Luft IV
