= Skolwin =

Neighbourhood of Szczecin, Poland

- Administrative neighbourhood
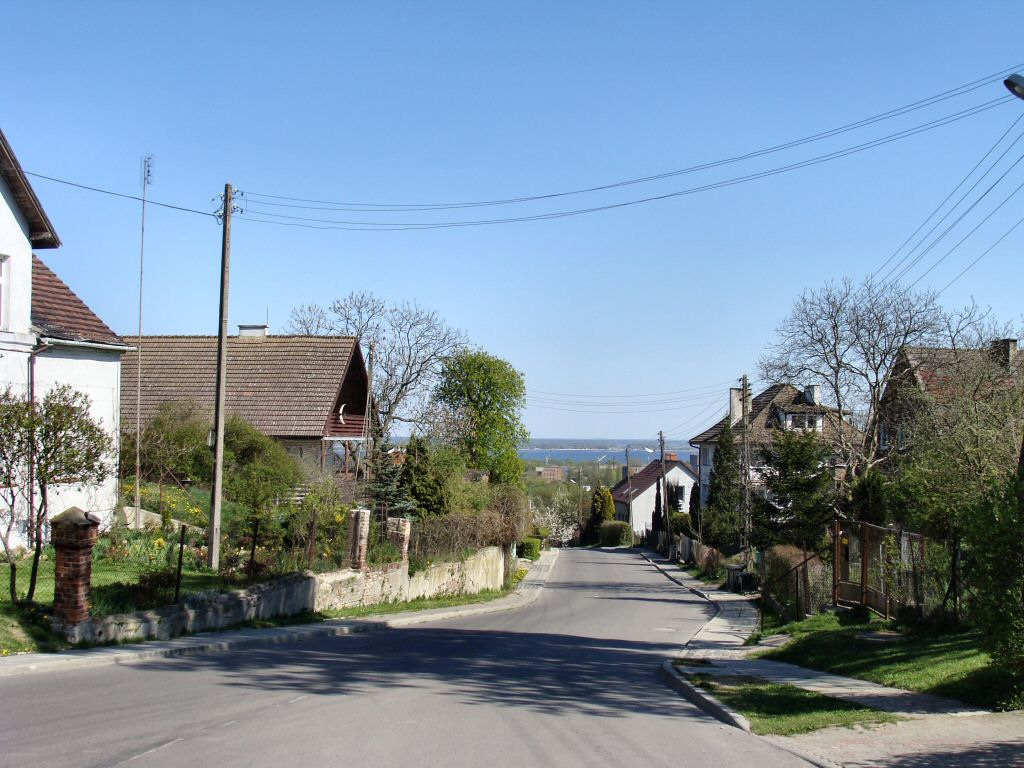
- The houses on Inwalidzka Street in Skolwin.

- Coordinates: 53°31′19″N 14°36′30″E
- Country: Poland
- Voivodeship: West Pomeranian
- City and county: Szczecin
- District: North

Area
  - Total: 12.6 km^{2} (4.9 sq mi)

Population (2025)
  - Total: 2,715
- Time zone: UTC+1 (CET)
  - Summer (DST): UTC+2 (CEST)
- Area code: +48 91
- Car plates: ZS

Skolwin (Polish: [ˈskɔl.vin]; German until 1929: Scholwin [ˈʃoːl.vɪn], German 1929–1945: Odermünde [ˈoːdərˌmʏn.də]) is an administrative neighbourhood forming a subdivision of the North district in the city of Szczecin, Poland. It is a residential area with single-family detached homes and tenements. It also includes an industrial area with manufacturing buildings. Within its boundaries, it also includes the neighbourhoods of Babin and Skoki. The neighbourhood has an area of 12.6 km^{2} (4.9 sq mi), and in 2025, was inhabited by 2,715 people. To the east, the neighbourhood lies on the coast of the West Oder river, in the Lower Oder Valley, with its western side being placed on the Przęsocin Plateau, and including the Mścięcino Forest Park, which forms a part of the Ueckermünde Heath. Skolwin features the Christ the King Church, a Roman Catholic parish church, which was originally built in the 13th century, and later rebuilt and expanded in the second half of the 15th century.

Skolwin was founded in the 13th century as a farming community. The same century, the hamlet of Babin was also recorded in its area. In 1911, a paper and pulp mill was founded in the village. The area was incorporated into the city in 1939.

== Toponomy ==
The name Skolwin comes from the former German name of the neighbourhood, Scholwin, used until 1929. From then until 1945, it was known in German as Odermünde, which means "the mouth of the Oder river". In 1945, it was known by Polish population of the city as Żółwino, and Ujście Odrzańskie. The name Żółwino (Polish: [ʐuwˈvi.nɔ]), comes from word żółw, meaning "turtle", and noun-forming suffix "-ino", characteristics of a place name. The name Ujście Odrzańskie (Polish: [ˈuj.ɕt͡ɕɛ ɔdˈʐaɲ.skiɛ]) is a direct calque of the German name Odermünde. On 12 November 1946, the neighbourhood was officially renamed to its current name.

== History ==
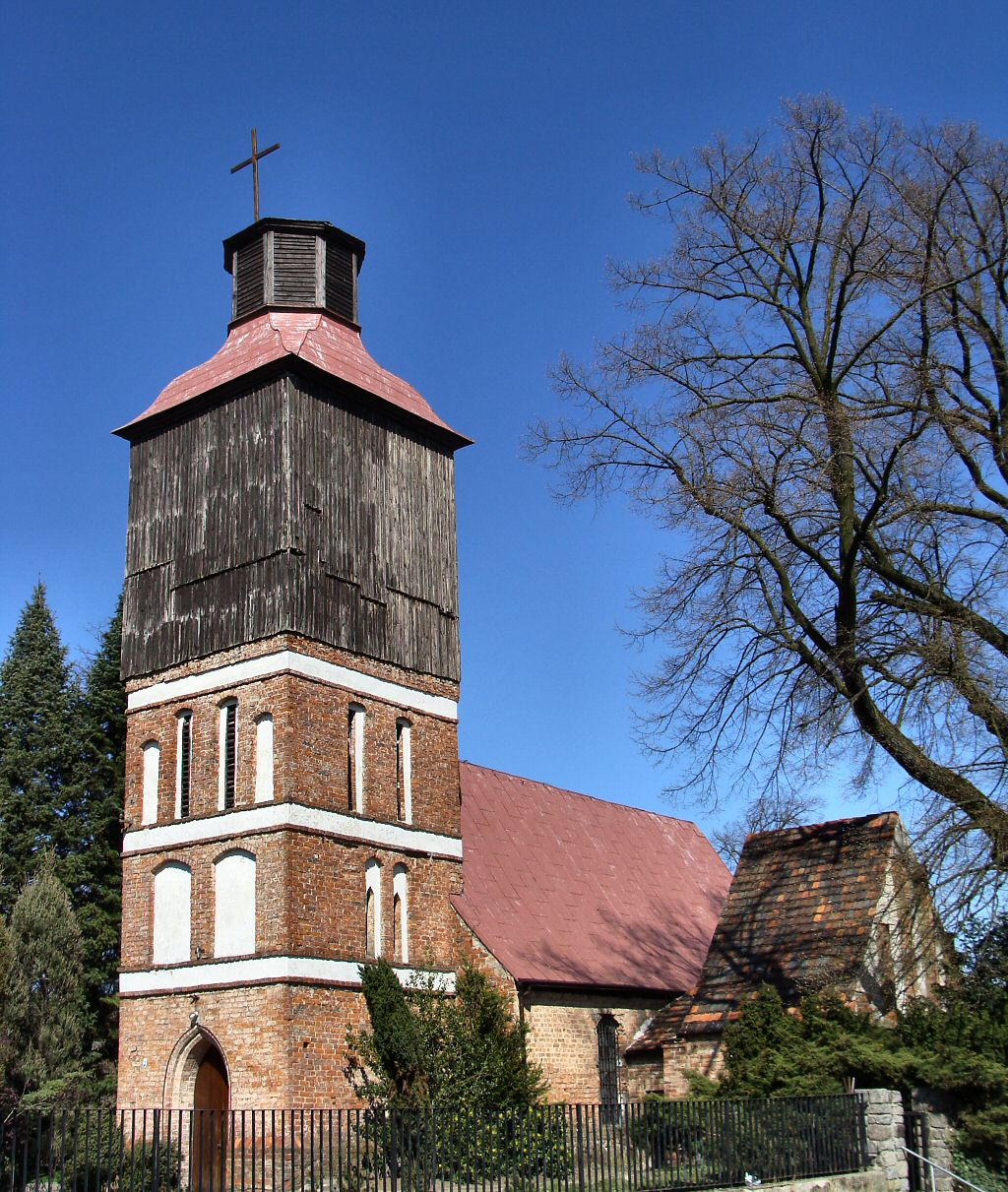
The Christ the King Church, constructed in the 13th century, and later rebuild and expanded in the second half of the 15th century.

Skolwin, then known under its German name Scholwin, was founded in the 13th century, as a small farming community. It included a Roman Catholic parish church, administration of which was granted in 1286 by Hermann von Gleichen, the bishop of Cammin, to the St. Mary Church in Szczecin (Stettin). In 1484, both the village and the church became its property. The church building, now known as the Christ the King Church, was rebuilt and expanded in the second half of the 15th century, and its denomination was changed to the Lutheranism in the 16th century during the Protestant Reformation. It was later heavily demerged in the first half of the 17th century, during the Thirty Years' War, and was later rebuilt in 1689. In the second half of the 17th century, it was demoted to a filial church of the parish in Stołczyn (Stolzenhagen). In 1946, it again became a Roman Catholic parish church.

In the 13th century, a hamlet with a manor house, then known as Cavelwisch, and now as Babin, was present to the east of Skolwin, in the area of the current Stołczyńska and Cegłówki Streets. Its oldest known written records date to 1360, when duke Barnim III, the ruler of the Duchy of Pomerania-Stettin, granted its ownership to the Carthusian monastery in Grabowo (Grabow).

A gristmill, known as the Mosquito Mill (Polish: Komarzy Młyn; German: Mückenmühle, lit. 'Nematocera Mill') was located to the west of Skolwin, with its oldest known records dating to 1464. It was placed on the Przęsocińska Struga stream, in the Ueckermünde Heath, with its portion now forming the Mścięcino Forest Park. In the 19th century, it became a popular sightseeing attraction, as part of a hiking trail. The structure was demolished after the Second World War. In 2024, its two incomplete millstones, were placed on a display on the site of the former gristmill.

In 1898, two railways stations were built in the area, as part of the line between Szczecin Main Station and Trzebież. They were Szczecin Skolwin, placed on Stołczyńska Street, near Skolwin and Babin, and Szczecin Mścięcino, placed on Parkowa Street, near Mścięcino (Messenthin). Both of them were closed 2002. The Szczecin Skolwin station is currently planned to be reopened in 2026, as part of the Szczecin Metropolitan Railway line.

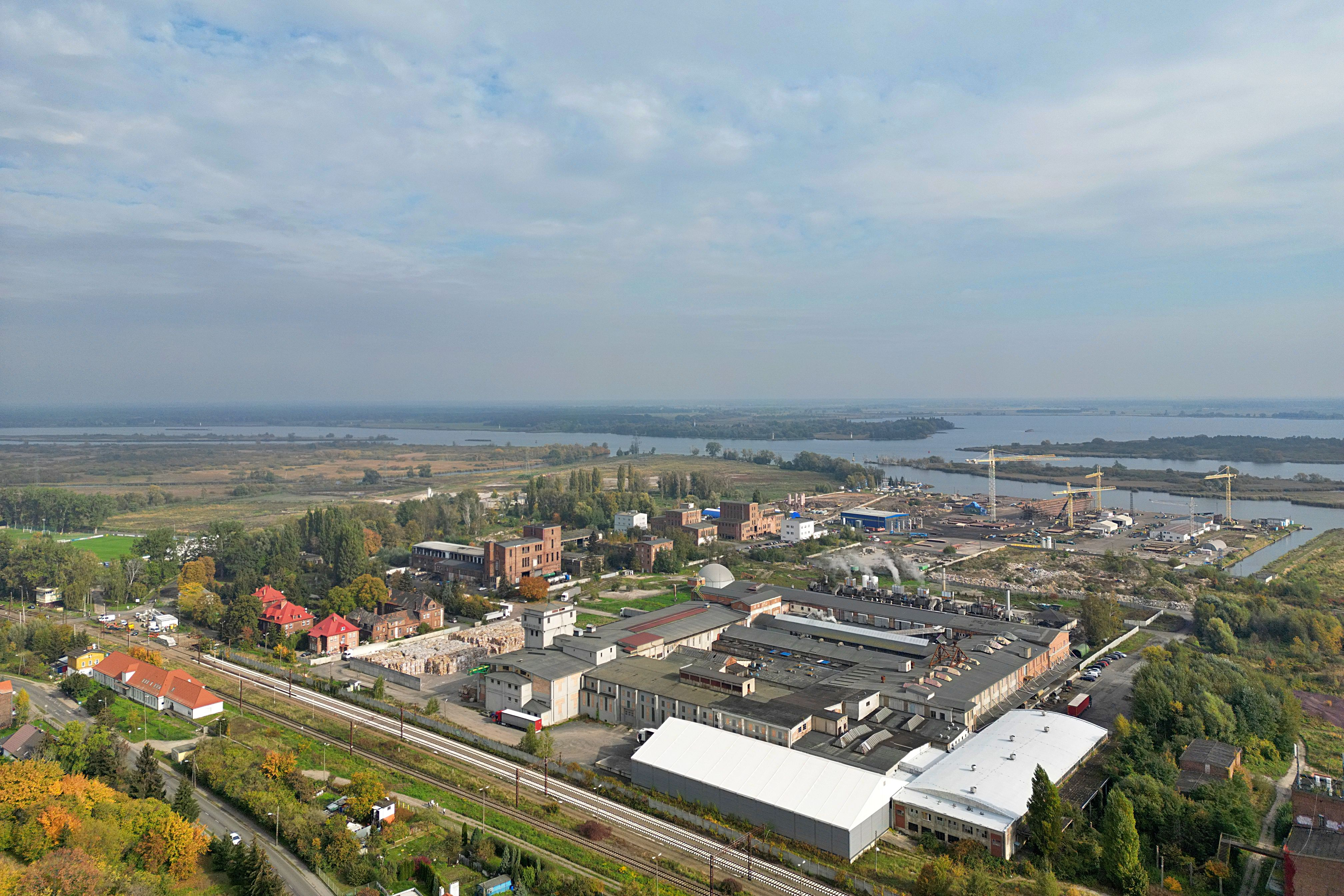
The complex of the Fabryka Papieru APIS paper mill in Skolwin, originally opened in 1911.

In 1911, the Feldmühle paper and pulp mill was opened in Babin at the current 100 Stołczyńska Street. In the 1920s, two neighbourhoods were developed near Babin in the 1920s, for the employees of the paper and pulp mill. They were Stara Kolonia (German: Alt-Kolonie, lit. 'Old Colony'), located in the area of the current Celulozowa, and Stołczyńska Streets, and Nowa Kolonia (German: Neu-Kolonie, lit. 'New Colony'), now known as Kolonia Cegłówki, located in the area of the current Stołczyńska and Cegłówki Streets, and developed between 1920 and 1927. After the Second World War, the paper and pulp mill was reopened in 1952, under the name Fabryka Papieru Szczecin-Skolwin. It was again closed in 2008, and reopened in 2015 under new company, as Fabryka Papieru APIS.

In 1928, a memorial, in form of a rock bearing an inscription, was placed in the Ueckermünde Heath, with its portion now forming the Mścięcino Forest Park, near the current Pancerna Street. It was dedicated to Adolf Schwieger, a publicist, columnist, and the postmaster of the Region of Stettin, following his death the same year. It was erected in gratification for him donating 2,000 papier marks for the creation of the tourist infrastructure in the village of Głębokie (Glambeck) and the Arkona Forest Park. It was placed on a hill, which became known as the President Schwieger Hill. After the end of the Second World War, the monument was forgotten about and lost, and was rediscovered and restored in 2023.

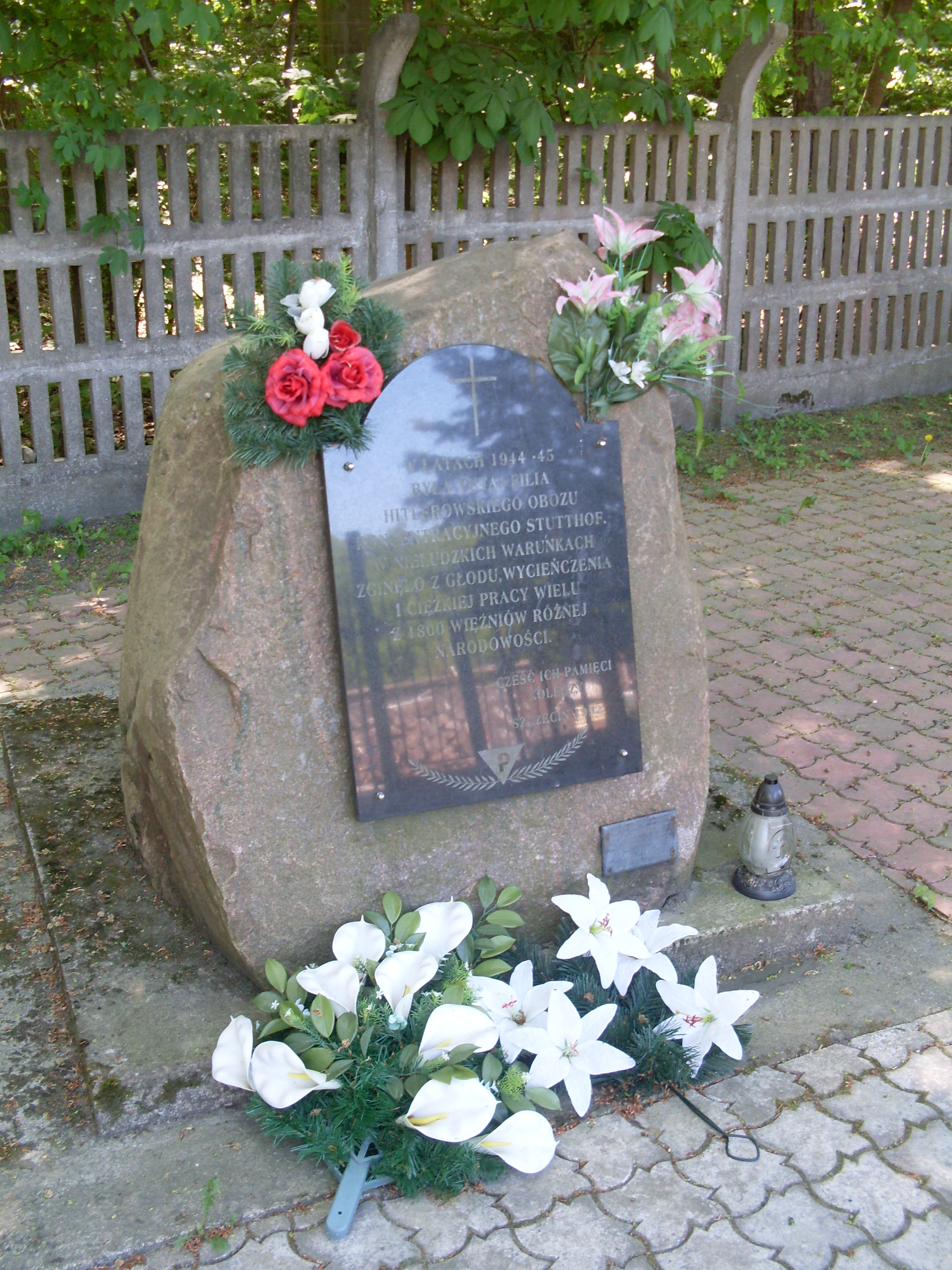
The memorial to the inmates of the labour camp operated by Germany from 1944 to 1945, on Ofiar Stutthofu Street within the Mścięcino Forest Park.

In 1929, the village, then known as Scholwin was renamed as Odermünde, meaning "the mouth of the Oder river". On 15 October 1939, Skolwin and Babin were incorporated into the city of Szczecin (Stettin). In October 1944, during the Second World War, a labour camp was opened to the northwest of Skolwin, in the northern portion of the Mścięcino Forest Park, in the area of the current Ofiar Stutthofu Street. It operated as a branch of the Stutthof concentration camp, and housed people forced to work at the Hydriewerke Pölitz AG coal liquefaction factory in the nearby neighbourhood of Police (now a separate town). After the war, the area was redeveloped into a small neighbourhood known as Osiedle Rzemieślnicze (lit. 'Craftsmen Estate'), with workshops and manufacturing buildings, as well as a few houses. During the conflict, a FuMG-62 Würzburg radar station also operated near Skolwin, being placed on the fields near the current Karpacka Street. It formed a part of the anti-aircraft defenses of the German Air Force, set up to protect the nearby Hydriewerke Pölitz AG factory. Its foundation are still present at the sight.

Szczecin was captured by the Red Army of the Soviet Union on 26 April 1945. It was placed under the Polish administration on 5 July 1945, while its suburbs, including the area of Skolwin, were placed under the Soviet military occupation. The neighbourhood became part of the Police Enclave, an area of the occupation, which while officially part of the territory of Poland, was administrated as part of the Randow District in the Soviet occupation zone in Germany. It was created to facilitate the removal of the machinery and resources of the Hydrierwerke Pölitz AG factory in Police, and its transportation to the Soviet Union. Over 20,000 workers and prisoners of war from Germany worked on the project in the Police Enclave, while Polish population was not allowed to settle in the area. Its southern portion, including Skolwin and its surroundings, was abolished on 19 July 1946, and subsequently incorporated into the city. Following the end of the conflict, the German population either fled or was expelled from Szczecin, and was replaced by Polish settlers, who begun moving in to Skolwin following its incorporation.

The neighbourhood of Skolwin was originally referred in 1945 by Polish residents of the city, as Żółwino, and Ujście Odrzańskie, the latter being the calque its the German name Odermünde. On 12 November 1946, it was officially renamed to its current name, Skolwin.

Additionally, the village of Mścięcino, located to the north of Skolwin, was also incorporated into Szczecin. In 1954, it was transferred to the town of Police in the north. In 1981, the voivode of the Szczecin Voivodeship issued a decree, transferring its small portion back to Szczecin. It included an area on Ofiar Stutthofu Street, mostly consisting of workshops and manufacturing buildings, with a few houses, known as known as Osiedle Rzemieślnicze. It was separated from the rest of the city by Mścięcino Forest Park, and lacked access to its facilities, such as waterworks and sewage, and was reportedly underserved by the police department. In 2005, the residents petitioned for the area to be transferred back to the town of Police, which was done on 1 January 2008.

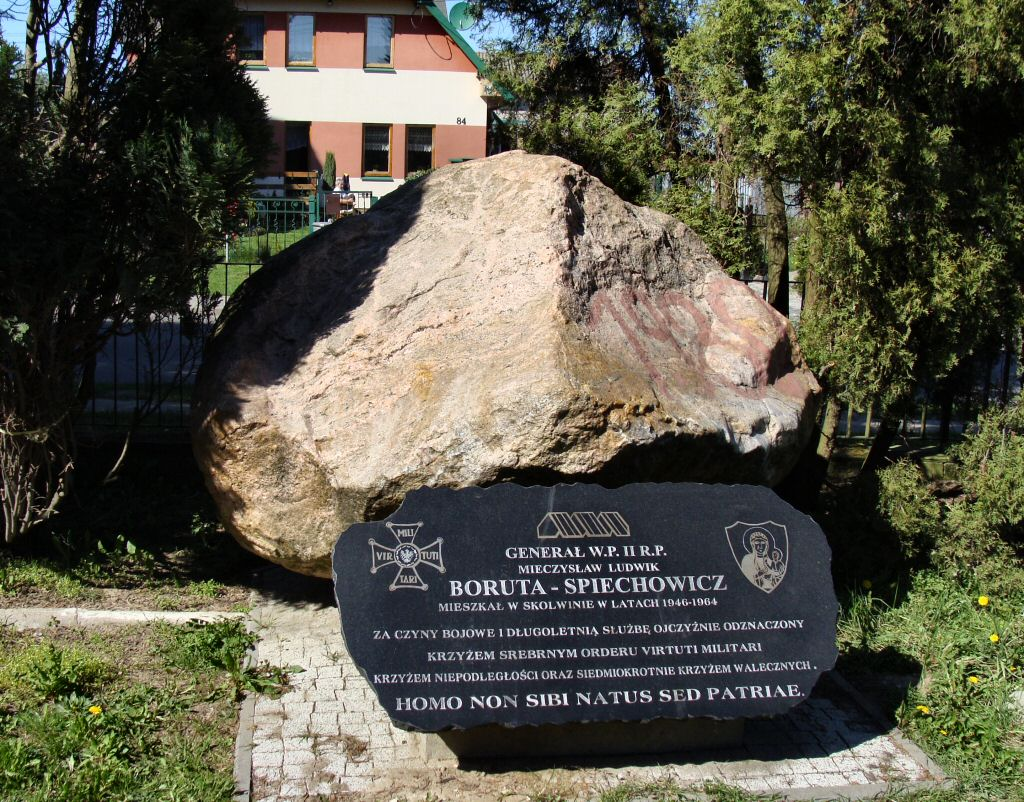
The memorial to Mieczysław Boruta-Spiechowicz, a brigadier general of the Polish Armed Forces, and a notable member of the anti-communist opposition in Poland, who resided in Skolwin from 1946 to 1964, and unofficially took on responsibilities of its village mayor (sołtys).

From 1946 to 1964, Mieczysław Boruta-Spiechowicz, a brigadier general of the Polish Armed Forces, and a notable member of the anti-communist opposition in Poland, resided in Skolwin, where he operated a farm, and unofficially took on responsibilities of its village mayor (sołtys). In 2005, he was commemorated with a memorial placed on 15 Inwalidzka Street next to the Christ the King Church, taking a form of a large rock and a granite commemorative plaque.

In 1952, the Świt Szczecin association football club was founded, originally as a company team for the employees of the local paper and pulp mill. Since 2024, it competes in the Second League of the Polish football. It is based at 100 Stołczyńska Street.

From 1955 to 1976, the neighbourhood of Skolwin formed one of the administrative subdivisions of the Nad Odrą district. In 1960, it had the population of 3,924 people. On 28 November 1990, the neighbourhood of Skolwin was established as one of the administrative subdivisions of the North district, being governed by an elected neighbourhood council. It also incorporated the neighbourhoods of Babin and Skoki, and until 2007, also included the area of Ofiar Stuffhofu Street, later incorporated into the town of Police.

In 2015, a portion of the land belonging to the complex of the Fabryka Papieru APIS paper mill was partitioned and sold to other companies, forming the Skolwin Industrial Park (Polish: Skolwiński Park Przemysłowy).

== Characteristics ==
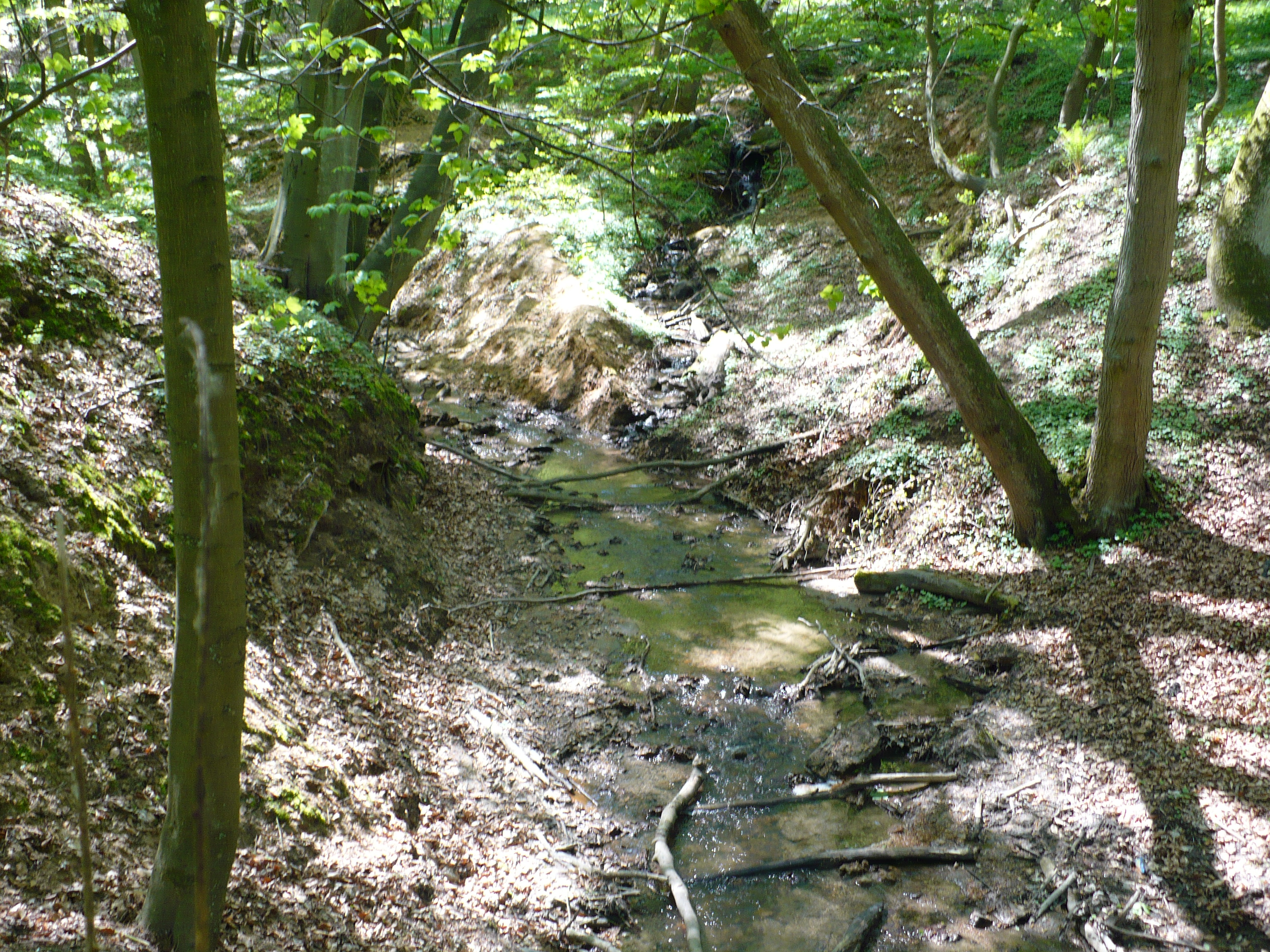
The Przęsocińska Struga stream, which flows thought the Mścięcino Forest Park.

Skolwin is a residential area with single-family detached homes and tenements. It also includes the neighbourhoods of Babin in the area of Stołczyńska and Cegłówki Streets, and Skoki in the area of Artyleryjska, Kamienna, and Plażowa Streets. In the east, in the area of Stołczyńska Street, it also has manufacturing industrial buildings, including the Fabryka Papieru APIS paper mill on 100 Stołczyńska Street, founded in 1911, as well as the area of the Skolwin Industrial Park (Polish: Skolwiński Park Przemysłowy). The neighbourhood also features the Christ the King Church, a Roman Catholic parish church, placed at 15 Inwalidzka Street, which was originally built in the 13th century, and later rebuilt and expanded in the second half of the 15th century. The neighbourhood is also crossed through by the railway line with two closed stations. They are Szczecin Skolwin on Stołczyńska Street, and Szczecin Mścięcino on Parkowa Street. The former is planned to be reopened in 2026 as part of the Szczecin Metropolitan Railway line.

In the east, the area is placed on the coast of the West Oder river, and in the northeast, it includes the island of Skolwiński Ostrów, with an area of 1.6 km^{2} (0.6 sq mi). It is separated from the mainland by the Cieśnica canal and the Skolwin Canal. To the northeast, it borders Wietlina, which forms a part of the Oder river. A portion of the northern boundary of Skolwin is also marked by the Łarpia river, which onto the West Oder river. In the south, the neighbourhood is also crossed by the Skolwinka stream, which surroundings are covered by the Three Streams Forest. In the northeast, the neighbourhood is covered by the Mścięcino Forest Park, which form part of the Ueckermünde Heath, and has an area of 297.46 ha. It is also crossed through by the streams Grzybnica and Przęsocińska Struga. Additionally, the central part of the neighbourhood is covered by the Skolwin Forest. The southwestern and northeastern portions of the neighbourhood are covered by the farmland. The western side of Skolwin lies within the Lower Oder Valley, while its eastern portion lies on the Przęsocin Plateau, a part of the Warszewo Hills.

The Mścięcino Forest Park features two millstones placed on a display near Przęsocińska Struga stream, as a remainder of the Mosquito Mill, a gristmill which stood there prior to the Second World War, with its oldest known records dating to 1464. The park also includes the memorial from 1928, in form an rock with an inscription, dedicated to Adolf Schwieger, a publicist, columnist, and the postmaster of the Region of Stettin, placed near Pancerna Street. Additionally, the neighborhood also includes a memorial from 2005, dedicated to Mieczysław Boruta-Spiechowicz, a brigadier general of the Polish Armed Forces, and a notable member of the anti-communist opposition in Poland, who resided in Skolwin from 1946 to 1964, unofficially took on responsibilities of its village mayor (sołtys). It also has a form a rock and commemorative plaque, and is placed on 15 Inwalidów Square next to the Christ the King Church.

The neighbourhood also includes the Świt Szczecin association football club, based at 100 Stołczyńska Street. Founded in 1952, it currently competes in the Second League of the Polish football.

== Demographics ==
Historical population
Year	2008	2009	2010	2011	2012	2013	2014	2015	2016	2017	2018	2019	2020	2021	2025
Pop.	3,410	3,378	3,276	3,204	3,195	3,186	3,168	3,124	3,071	3,030	2,992	2,880	2,880	2,817	2,715
±%	—	−0.9%	−3.0%	−2.2%	−0.3%	−0.3%	−0.6%	−1.4%	−1.7%	−1.3%	−1.3%	−3.7%	+0.0%	−2.2%	−3.6%

== Government and boundaries ==
Skolwin is one of the administrative neighbourhoods forming a subdivision of the North district in the city of Szczecin, Poland. It is governed by a locally elected neighbourhood council with 15 members. Its headquarters are located at 171 Stołczyńska Street. Its boundaries are approximately determined by the city boundaries, Nadbrzeżna Street, Stołczyńska Street, the West Oder river, Skolwinka stream, the Przęsocińska Struga stream, and the boundary with the neighbourhood of Stołczyn. Skolwin borders the neighbourhood of Stołczyn to the south, the town of Police to the north, and the municipality of Police in Police County to the west, including the village of Przęsocin. It also borders the neighbourhood of Dąbie to the east via the Oder river. The neighbourhood has the total area of 12.6 km^{2} (4.9 sq mi).
