= Skoki, Szczecin =

Neighbourhood of Szczecin, Poland

Skoki
- Neighbourhood
- Interactive map of Skoki
- Coordinates: 53.523372°N 14.590883°E
- Country: Poland
- Voivodeship: West Pomeranian
- City and county: Szczecin
- District: North
- Administrative neighbourhood: Skolwin
- Time zone: UTC+1 (CET)
  - Summer (DST): UTC+2 (CEST)
- Area code: +48 91
- Car plates: ZS

Skoki (Polish: [ˈskɔ.kʲi]) is a neighbourhood of Szczecin, Poland, located within the North district, in the administrative subdivision of Skolwin. It is a residential neighbourhood with single-family detached homes, placed in the area of Artyleryjska, Kamienna, Plażowa, and Przęsocińska Streets. It is placed on the Warszewo Hills, and to the west, it borders the Mścięcino Forest Park, which form part of the Ueckermünde Heath. The area was incorporated into the city in 1939.

== History ==
In the 13th century, the village of Skolwin (German: Scholwin) was founded in the 13th century in the area of the current Inwalidzka and Łomżańska Streets. Over time, the area of the current neighbourhood of Skoki developed as an expansion of the village, in the area of Artyleryjska, Kamienna, and Plażowa Streets.

A gristmill, known as the Mosquito Mill (Polish: Komarzy Młyn; German: Mückenmühle, lit. 'Nematocera Mill') was also present in the area, being located to the west of Skolwin, with its oldest known records dating to 1464. It was placed on the Przęsocińska Struga stream, in the Ueckermünde Heath, with its portion now forming the Mścięcino Forest Park. In the 19th century, it became a popular sightseeing attraction, as part of a hiking trail. The structure was demolished after the Second World War. In 2024, its two incomplete millstones, were placed on a display on the site of the former gristmill.

In 1928, a memorial, in form of a rock bearing an inscription, was placed in the Ueckermünde Heath, with its portion now forming the Mścięcino Forest Park, near the current Pancerna Street, to the west of Skolwin and Skoki. It was dedicated to Adolf Schwieger, a publicist, columnist, and the postmaster of the Region of Stettin, following his death the same year. It was erected in gratification for him donating 2,000 papier marks for the creation of the tourist infrastructure in the village of Głębokie (Glambeck) and the Arkona Forest Park. It was placed on a hill, which became known as the President Schwieger Hill. After the end of the Second World War, the monument was forgotten about and lost, and was rediscovered and restored in 2023.

On 15 October 1939, the area was incorporated into the city of Szczecin (Stettin). On 26 April 1945, during the Second World War, the city was captured by the Red Army of the Soviet Union. It was placed under the Polish administration on 5 July 1945, while its suburbs, including the area of Skolwin and Skoki, were placed under the Soviet military occupation. It became part of the Police Enclave, an area of the occupation, which while officially part of the territory of Poland, was administrated as part of the Randow District in the Soviet occupation zone in Germany. It was created to facilitate the removal of the machinery and resources of the Hydrierwerke Pölitz AG factory in the nearby Police, and its transportation to the Soviet Union. Over 20,000 workers and prisoners of war from Germany worked on the project in the Police Enclave, while Polish population was not allowed to settle in the area. Its southern portion, including Skolwin and Skoki, was abolished on 19 July 1946, and subsequently incorporated into the city. Following the end of the conflict, the German population either fled or was expelled from Szczecin, and was replaced by Polish settlers, who begun moving in the area following its incorporation.

From 1955 to 1976, Skoki was part of the neighbourhood of Skolwin, which formed one of the administrative subdivisions of the Nad Odrą district. On 28 November 1990, the area became part of the neighbourhood of Skolwin, established as one of the administrative subdivisions of the North district, being governed by an elected neighbourhood council.

== Characteristics ==
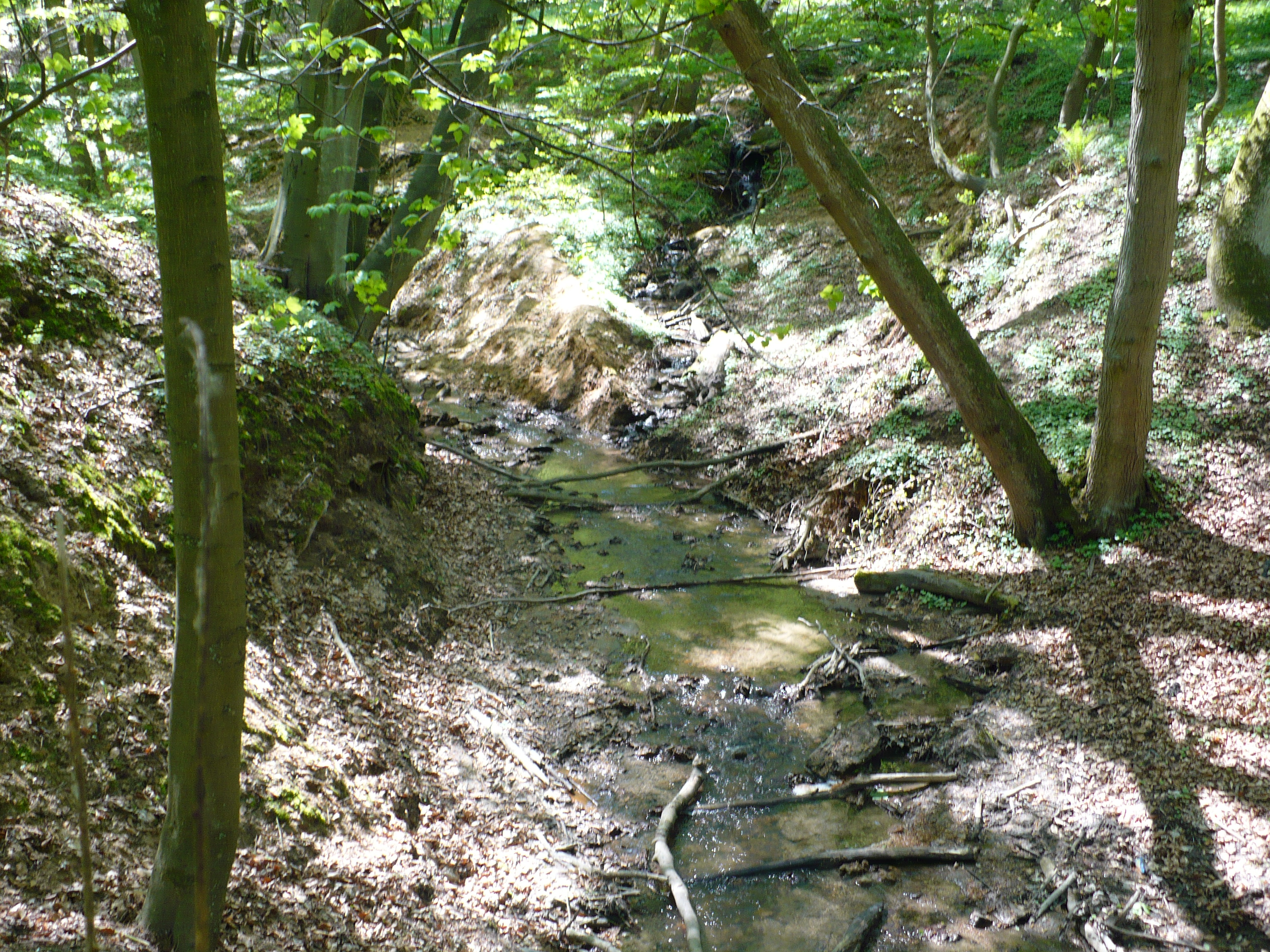
The Przęsocińska Struga stream, flowing in the Mścięcino Forest Park to the west of the neighbourhood of Skoki.

Skoki is a residential neighbourhood with single-family detached homes, located in the area of Artyleryjska, Kamienna, and Plażowa Streets. It is placed on the Warszewo Hills, and to the west, it borders the Mścięcino Forest Park, which form part of the Ueckermünde Heath. The forested area also crossed through by the streams Grzybnica and Przęsocińska Struga. It features two millstones placed on a display near Przęsocińska Struga stream, as a remainder of the Mosquito Mill, a gristmill which stood there prior to the Second World War, with its oldest known records dating to 1464. The park also includes the memorial from 1928, in form an rock with an inscription, dedicated to Adolf Schwieger, a publicist, columnist, and the postmaster of the Region of Stettin, placed near Pancerna Street.
