= Mścięcino Forest Park =

Forest park in Poland

Coordinates: 53.3407°N 14.5994°E

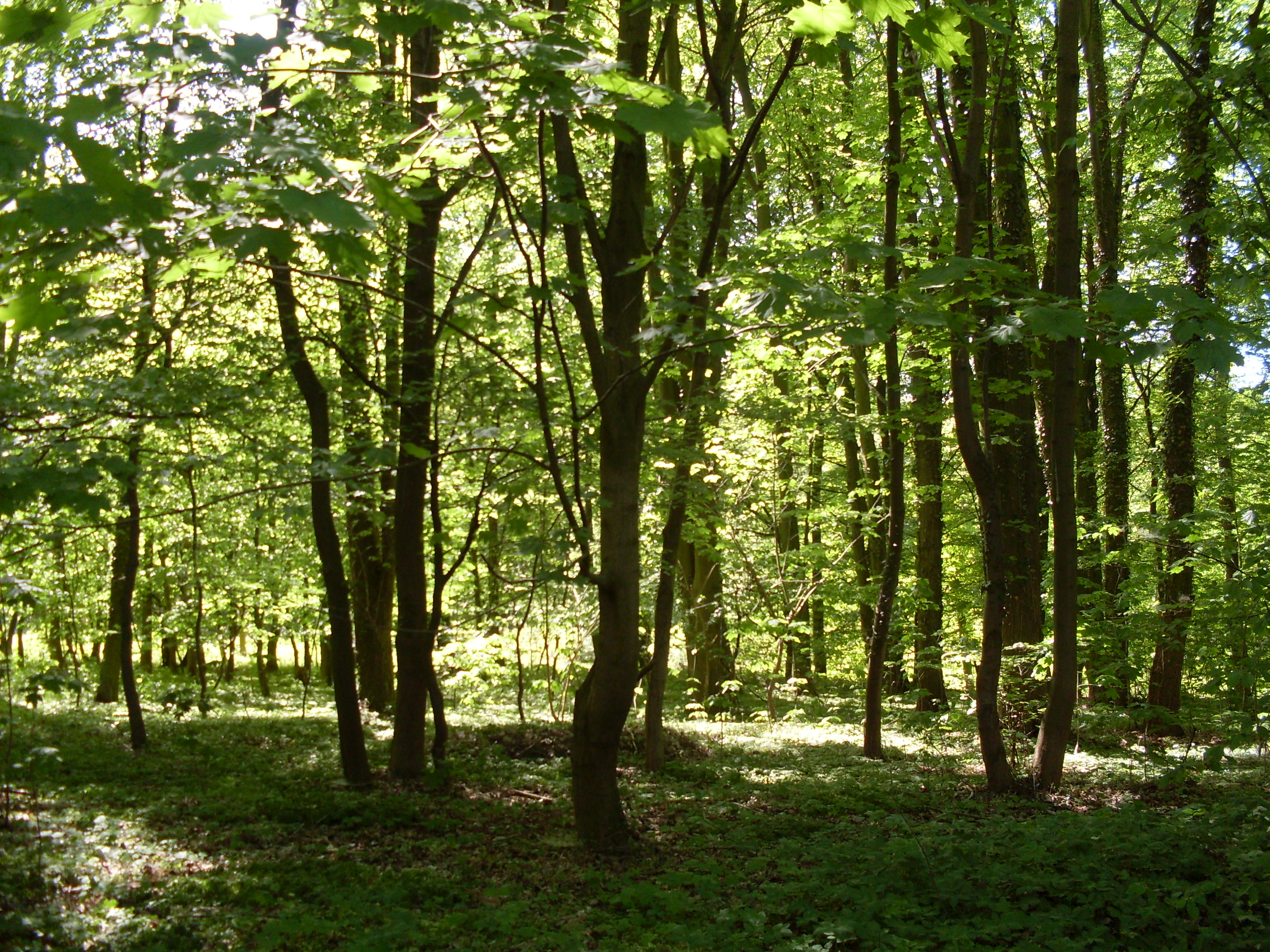
- The trees in the Mścięcino Forest Park.

- Location within Poland

Geography
- Location: Gryfino County, West Pomeranian Voivodeship, Poland

Administration
- Status: Forest park

The Mścięcino Forest Park (Polish pronunciation: [mɕt͡ɕɛɲˈt͡ɕi.nɔ]; Polish: Park Leśny Mścięcino), also known as the Mścięcino Woods (Polish: Las Mścięciński; German until 1945: Messenthin-Wald), is an urban forest park divided between the city of Szczecin, and the town of Police, within West Pomeranian Voivodeship, Poland. It has an area of 297.46 ha, and forms a part of the Ueckermünde Heath, being placed on the Przęsocin Plateau, a part of the Warszewo Hills. The majority of its area is located within the city of Szczecin, within its neighbourhood of Skolwin, with its small northern portion, being part of the neighbourhood of Mścięcino in the town of Police.

== History ==
A gristmill, known as the Mosquito Mill (Polish: Komarzy Młyn; German: Mückenmühle, lit. 'Nematocera Mill') was located in the Mścięcino Forest Park, with its oldest known records dating to 1464. It was placed on the Przęsocińska Struga stream. In the 19th century, it became a popular sightseeing attraction, as part of a hiking trail. The structure was demolished after the Second World War. In 2024, its two incomplete millstones, were placed on a display on the site of the former gristmill.

In 1898, the Szczecin Mścięcino railway station, originally known as Messenthin, was opened at the northern edge of the forest, near Parkowa Street. Its railway tracks, which crossed the northern edge of the woods, were part of the line between Szczecin Main Station and Trzebież. The station was closed down in 2002.

In 1928, a memorial, in form of a rock bearing an inscription, was placed in the Mścięcino Forest Park, near the current Pancerna Street. It was dedicated to Adolf Schwieger, a publicist, columnist, and the postmaster of the Region of Stettin, following his death the same year. It was erected in gratification for him donating 2,000 papier marks for the creation of the tourist infrastructure in the village of Głębokie (Glambeck) and the Arkona Forest Park. It was placed on a hill, which became known as the President Schwieger Hill. After the end of the Second World War, the monument was forgotten about and lost, and was rediscovered and restored in 2023.

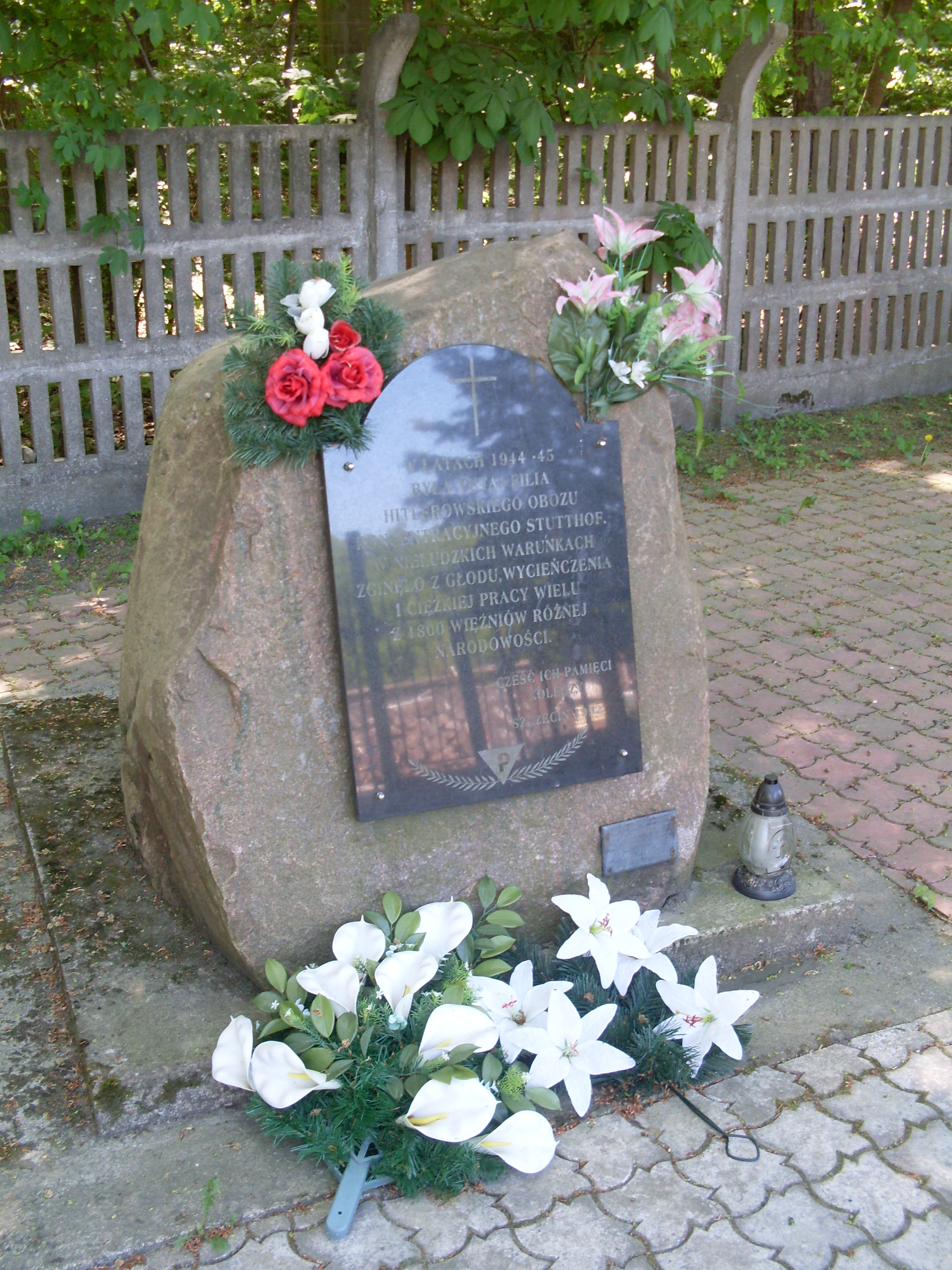
The memorial to the inmates of the labour camp operated by Germany from 1944 to 1945, on Ofiar Stutthofu Street within the Mścięcino Forest Park.

On 15 October 1939, the woods were incorporated into the city of Szczecin. In October 1944, during the Second World War, a labor camp was opened in the northern portion of the woods, in the area of the current Ofiar Stutthofu Street. It operated as a branch of the Stutthof concentration camp, and housed people forced to work at the Hydriewerke Pölitz AG coal liquefaction factory in the nearby neighbourhood of Police (now a separate town). After the war, the area was redeveloped into a small neighbourhood known as Osiedle Rzemieślnicze (lit. 'Craftsmen Estate'), with workshops and manufacturing buildings, as well as a few houses. The location also includes two memorials, both in form of a commemorative plaque on a rock, dedicated to the victims of the labour camp. They were unveiled in 1992 and 2010. The latter, is dedicated to the Jewish inmates, who died there.

The city of Szczecin was captured by the Red Army of the Soviet Union on 26 April 1945. It was placed under the Polish administration on 5 July 1945, while its suburbs, including the area of the woods, were placed under the Soviet military occupation. The woods were again reincorporated into the city of Szczecin on 19 July 1946. In 1954, their northernmost portion, including the area of Ofiar Stutthofu Street, was transferred to the town of Police, and later, back to Szczecin in 1981. It was once again reincorpoarted by Police on 1 January 2008.

== Characteristics ==
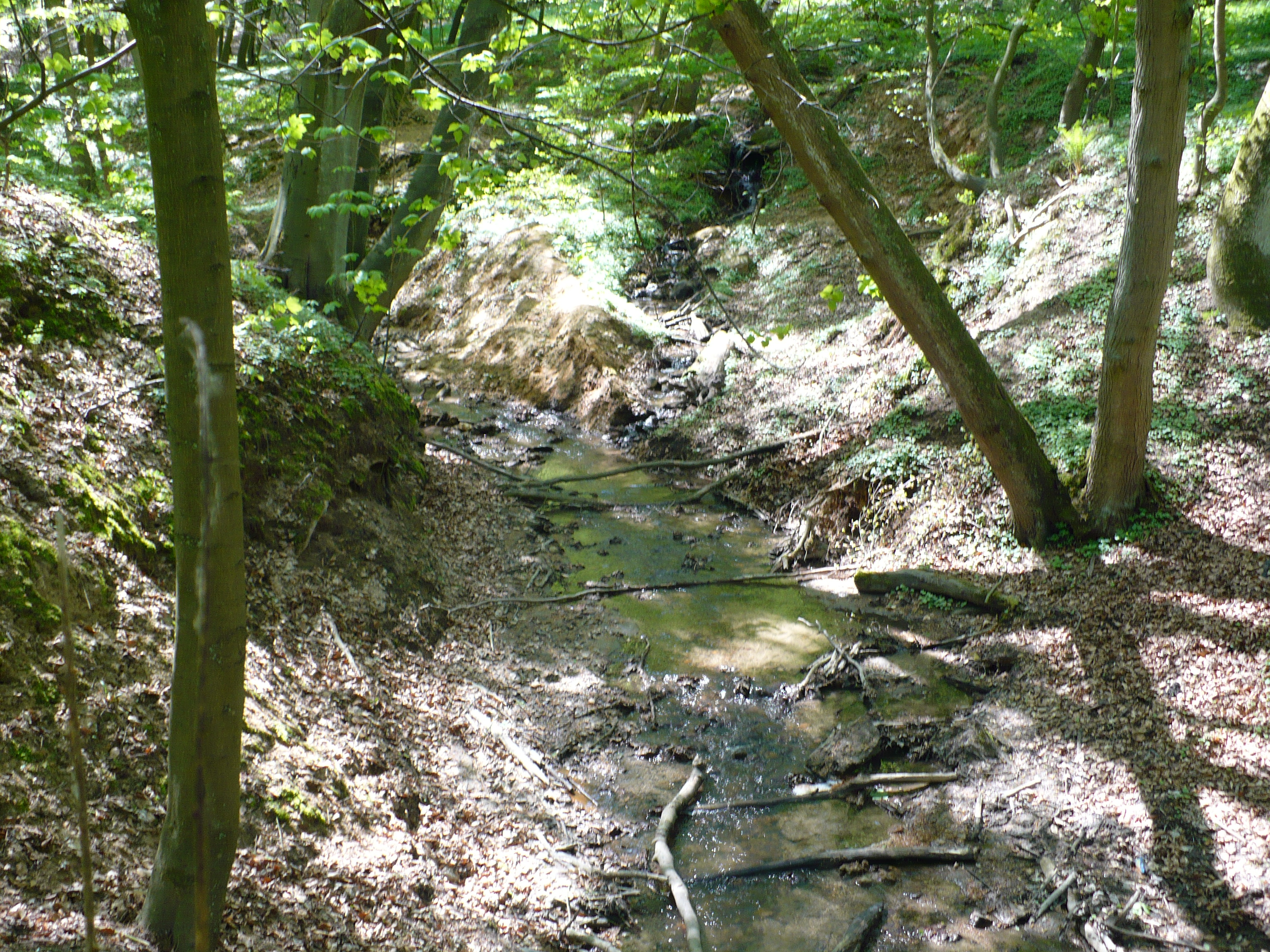
The Przęsocińska Struga stream, which flows thought the Mścięcino Forest Park.

The Mścięcino Forest Park is an urban forest, with a status of a forest park, placed on the Przęsocin Plateau, a part of the Warszewo Hills. It has an area of 297.46 ha, and forms a part of the Ueckermünde Heath. It is also categorised as one of the Szczecin Heaths forest promotion complex. The majority of its area is located within the city of Szczecin, within its neighbourhood of Skolwin, with its small northern portion, being part of the neighbourhood of Mścięcino in the town of Police. The forest crossed through by the streams Grzybnica and Przęsocińska Struga. The northern and eastern portion of the forest park is crossed by a marked hiking path, named the Trail of the Wild Boars Paths (Polish: Szlak Ścieżkami Dzików).

The forest features two millstones placed on a display near Przęsocińska Struga stream, as a remainder of the Mosquito Mill, a gristmill which stood there prior to the Second World War, with its oldest known records dating to 1464. The park also includes the memorial from 1928, in form an rock with an inscription, dedicated to Adolf Schwieger, a publicist, columnist, and the postmaster of the Region of Stettin, placed near Pancerna Street.

Its northern portion features a small urban enclave, in form of a small neighbourhood known as Osiedle Rzemieślnicze (lit. 'Craftsmen Estate'), with workshops and manufacturing buildings, as well as a few houses. It is located on Ofiar Stutthofu Street, near its intersection with Przęsocińska Street. The area is administrated by the town of Police. The area also includes two memorials, both in form of a commemorative plaque on a rock, dedicated to the victims of the labour camp, which was operated there from 1944 to 1945 by Germany, during the Second World War. They were unveiled in 1992 and 2010. The latter, is dedicated to the Jewish inmates, who died there.

A northern portion of the woods is also crossed by the railway tracks. It includes the building of the Szczecin Mścięcino railway station, which operated from 1898 to 2002.
