= Siedliczka =

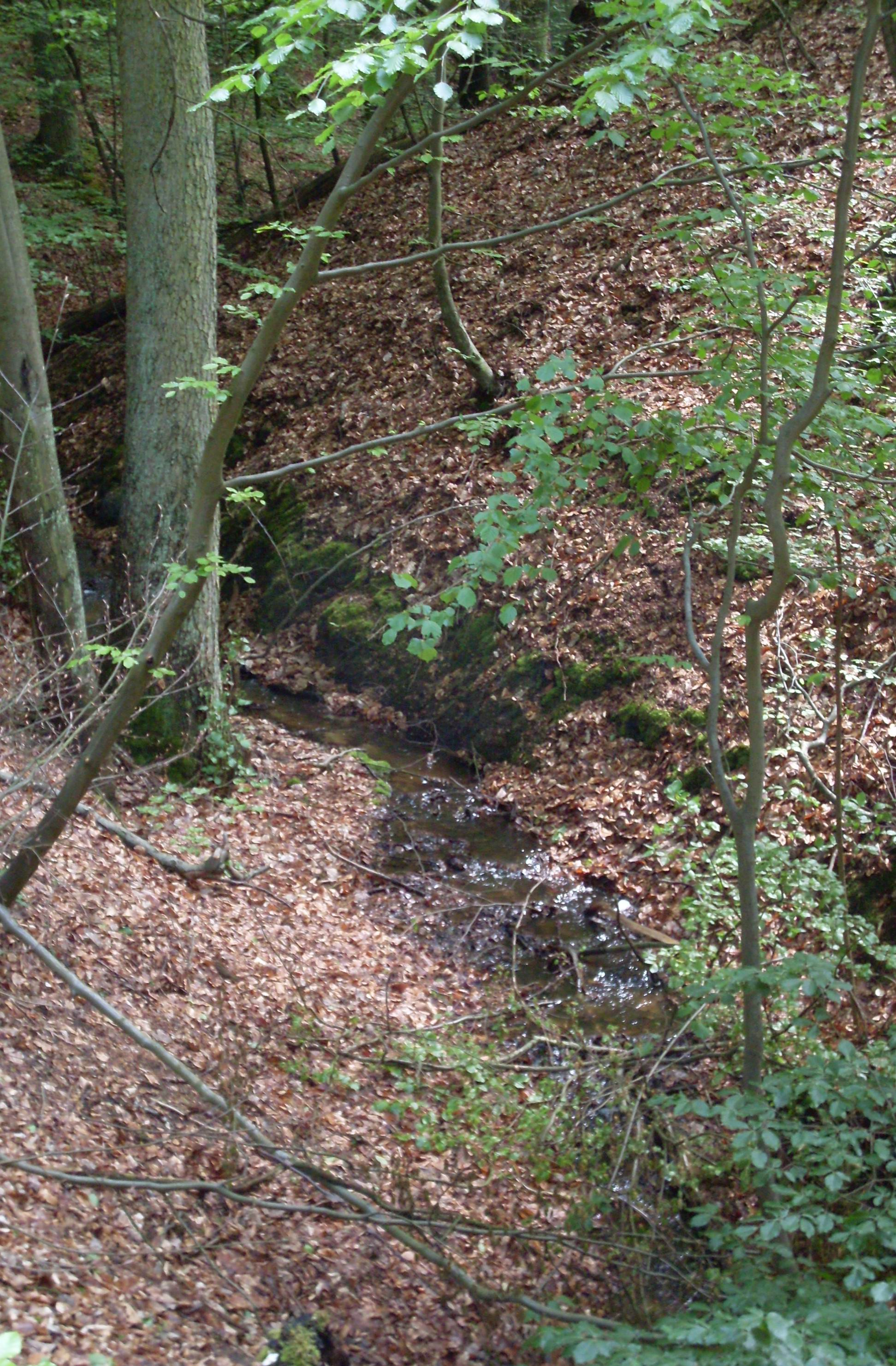

Location
- Country: Poland
- Voivodeship: West Pomeranian
- County (Powiat): Police
- Gmina: Gmina Police

Physical characteristics
- Source
  - location: west of Przęsocin
  - coordinates: 53°30′18″N 14°32′05″E
- Mouth
  - location: south of Police, near the Księcia Bogusława X neighborhood
- Length: 7 km (4.3 mi)

Siedliczka is a small river of the Wkrzańska Forest in northwestern Poland, near the town of Police.

== See also ==
- Sołtysi
