= Osiedle Rzemieślnicze =

Neighbourhood in Police, Poland

- Neighbourhood
- Interactive map of Osiedle Rzemieślnicze
- Coordinates: 53.53403°N 14.57287°E
- Country: Poland
- Voivodeship: West Pomeranian
- County: Police
- Municipality: Police
- Town: Police
- Administrative neighbourhood: Mścięcino
- Time zone: UTC+1 (CET)
  - Summer (DST): UTC+2 (CEST)
- Area code: +48 91
- Car plates: ZPL

Osiedle Rzemieślnicze (Polish: [ɔˈɕɛ.dlɛ ʐɛ.mjɛɕlˈɲi.t͡ʂɛ]; lit. 'Craftsmen Estate') is a small neighbourhood in the town of Police in West Pomeranian Voivodeship, Poland. It is located within the administrative neighbourhood of Mścięcino, on Ofiar Stutthofu Street, at the corner with Przęsocińska Street. It is a small industrial area with workshops and manufacturing buildings, as well as a few houses. It is surrounded by the Mścięcino Forest Park.

The area was incorporated into the city of Szczecin in 1939. The settlement was founded in October 1944, as a German labour camp, being a branch of the Stutthof concentration camp. It housed people forced to work at the Hydriewerke Pölitz AG coal liquefaction factory in Police. After the war, it was redeveloped into a small neighbourhood and industrial district. In 1954, it was transferred to the town of Police, and back to Szczecin in 1981. It was again transferred to Police in 2008.

== History ==
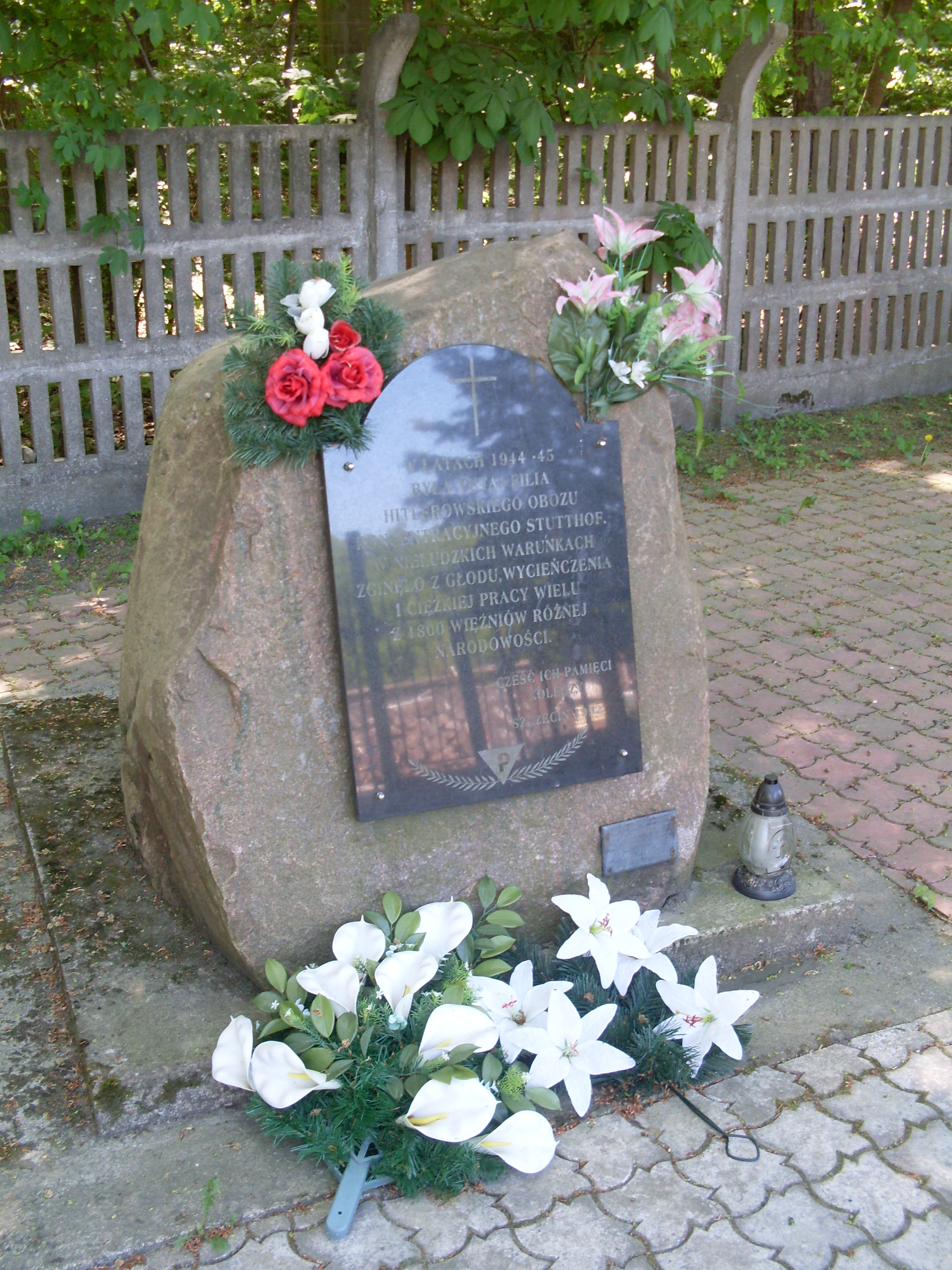
The memorial to the inmates of the labour camp operated on Ofiar Stutthofu Street by Germany from 1944 to 1945.

The area was incorporated into the city of Szczecin (German: Stettin) on 15 October 1939. In October 1944, during the Second World War, a labour camp was opened in the area of the current Ofiar Stutthofu Street, within the Ueckermünde Heath, which part now forms the Mścięcino Woods. It operated as a branch of the Stutthof concentration camp, and housed people forced to work at the Hydriewerke Pölitz AG coal liquefaction factory in the nearby neighbourhood of Police (now a separate town). The labour camp was built near the Szczecin Mścięcino railway station (then known as Messenthin), which was as part of the line between Szczecin Main Station and Trzebież. The station was later closed down in 2002.

The city was captured by the Red Army of the Soviet Union on 26 April 1945. It was placed under the Polish administration on 5 July 1945, while its suburbs, including the area of Osiedle Rzemieślnicze, were placed under the Soviet military occupation. The area became part of the Police Enclave, which while officially part of the territory of Poland, was administrated as part of the Randow District in the Soviet occupation zone in Germany. It was created to facilitate the removal of the machinery and resources of the Hydrierwerke Pölitz AG factory in Police, and its transportation to the Soviet Union. Over 20,000 workers and prisoners of war from Germany worked on the project in the Police Enclave, while Polish population was not allowed to settle in the area. Its southern portion, including Mścięcino Forest Park, was abolished on 19 July 1946, and subsequently incorporated into the city. Following the end of the conflict, the German population either fled or was expelled from Szczecin, and was replaced by Polish settlers. After the war, the former labour camp was redeveloped into a small neighbourhood known as Osiedle Rzemieślnicze (lit. 'Craftsmen Estate'), with workshops and manufacturing buildings, as well as a few houses.

The location of the former labour camp includes two memorials, both in form of a commemorative plaque on a rock, dedicated to the victims of the labour camp. They were unveiled in 1992 and 2010. The latter, is dedicated to the Jewish inmates, who died there.

In 1954, the neighbourhood was transferred to the town of Police in the north. In 1981, the voivode of the Szczecin Voivodeship issued a decree, transferring Osiedle Rzemieślnicze back to Szczecin. It was separated from the rest of the city by Mścięcino Forest Park, and lacked access to its facilities, such as waterworks and sewage, and was reportedly underserved by the police department. From 28 November 1990, it was a part of the neighbourhood of Skolwin, which formed one of the administrative subdivisions of the North district, being governed by an elected neighbourhood council. In 2005, the residents petitioned for the area to be transferred back to the town of Police, which was done on 1 January 2008, becoming part of its administrative neighbourhood of Mścięcino.

== Characteristics ==
Osiedle Rzemieślnicze is an industrial area with workshops and manufacturing buildings, as well as a few houses, located on Ofiar Stutthofu Street, at the corner with Przęsocińska Street. It is an urban enclave, surrounded by the Mścięcino Forest Park, which forms a part of the Ueckermünde Heath. The area also includes two memorials, both in form of a commemorative plaque on a rock, dedicated to the victims of the labour camp, which was operated there from 1944 to 1945 by Germany, during the Second World War. They were unveiled in 1992 and 2010. The latter, is dedicated to the Jewish inmates, who died there.
