= Sołtysi =

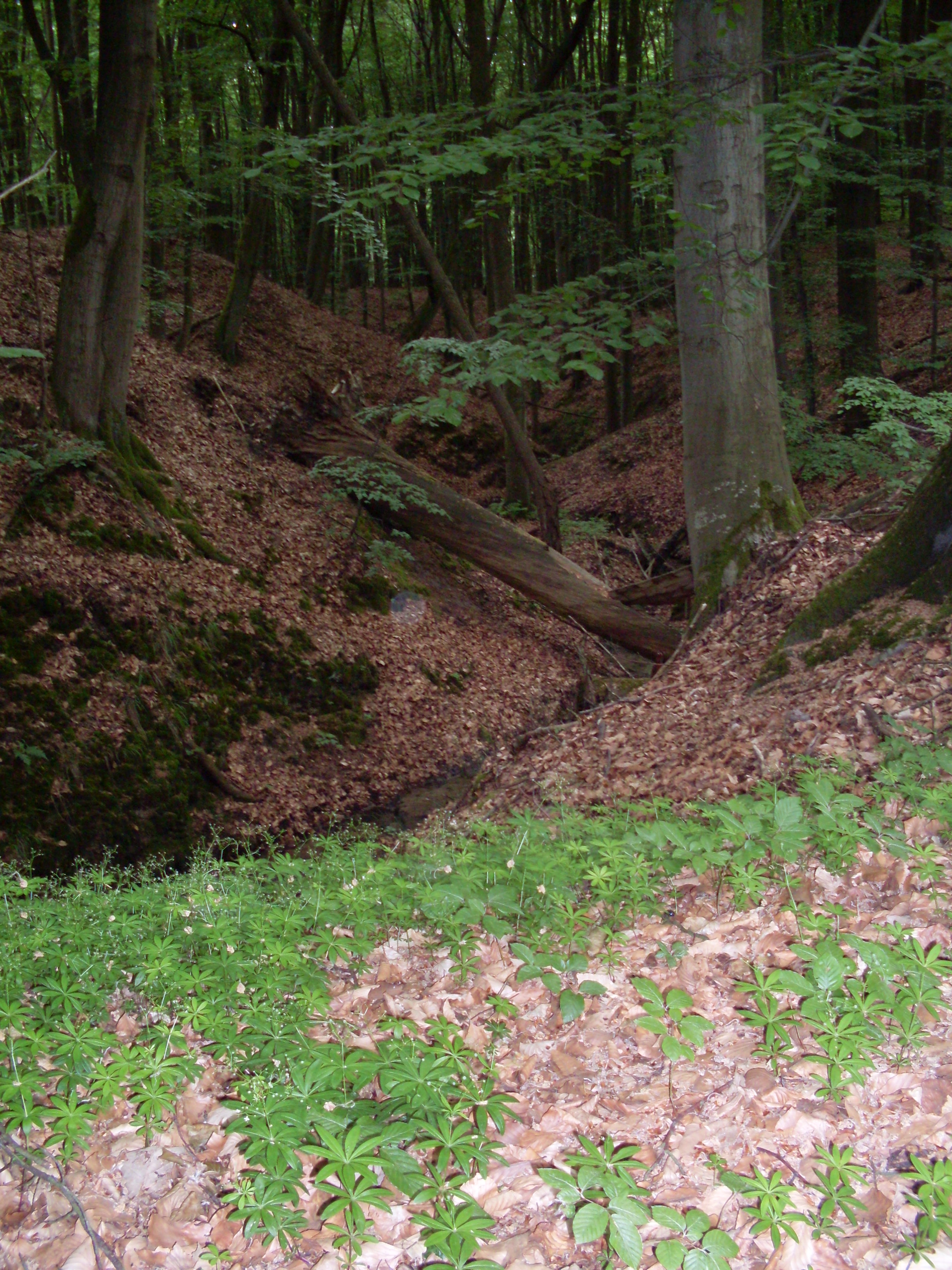

Location
- Country: Poland
- Voivodeship: West Pomeranian
- County (Powiat): Police
- Gmina: Gmina Police

Physical characteristics
- Source
  - location: east of Leśno Górne
  - coordinates: 53°30′22″N 14°32′28″E
- Mouth: Siedliczka
  - location: southeast of Siedlice
  - coordinates: 53°31′21″N 14°32′18″E
- Length: 3 km (1.9 mi)

Sołtysi is a river of Poland, a tributary of the Siedliczka.
