= Babin, Szczecin =

Neighbourhood of Szczecin, Poland

Babin
- Neighbourhood
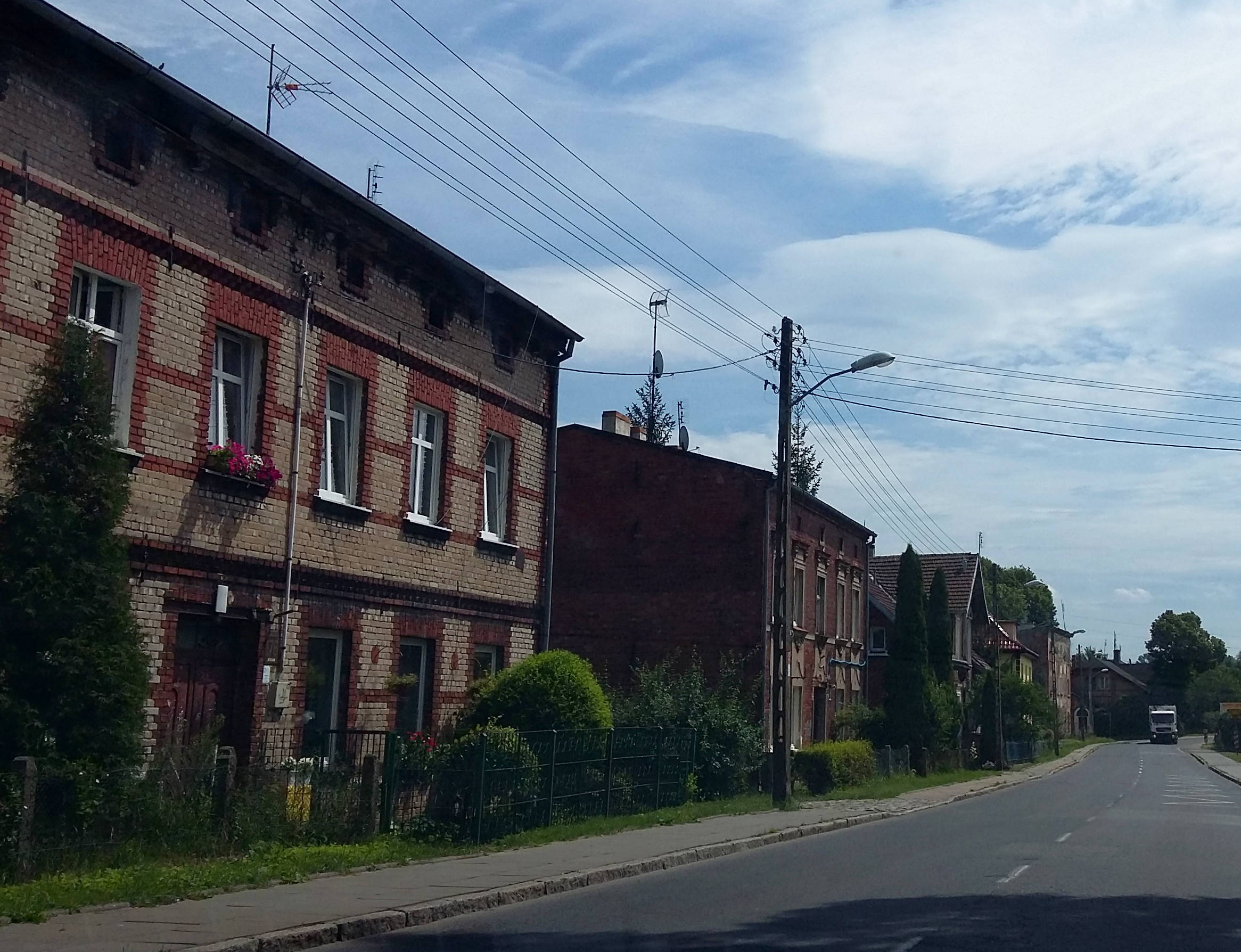
- Tenements on Stołczyńska Street in Babin
- Interactive map of Babin
- Coordinates: 53.517095°N 14.614006°E
- Country: Poland
- Voivodeship: West Pomeranian
- City and county: Szczecin
- District: North
- Administrative neighbourhood: Skolwin
- Time zone: UTC+1 (CET)
  - Summer (DST): UTC+2 (CEST)
- Area code: +48 91
- Car plates: ZS

Babin (Polish: [ˈba.bin]; German until 1945: Cavelwisch [ˈkavl̩vɪʃ]) is a neighbourhood of Szczecin, Poland, located within the North district, in the administrative subdivision of Skolwin. It is a residential area with single-family detached homes and tenements. It also includes an industrial area with manufacturing buildings. It is located in the area of Stołczyńska and Cegłówki Streets, near the coast of the West Oder river. Its oldest known written come from the 19th century. In 1911, a paper and pulp mill was founded in the village. The area was incorporated into the city in 1939.

== History ==
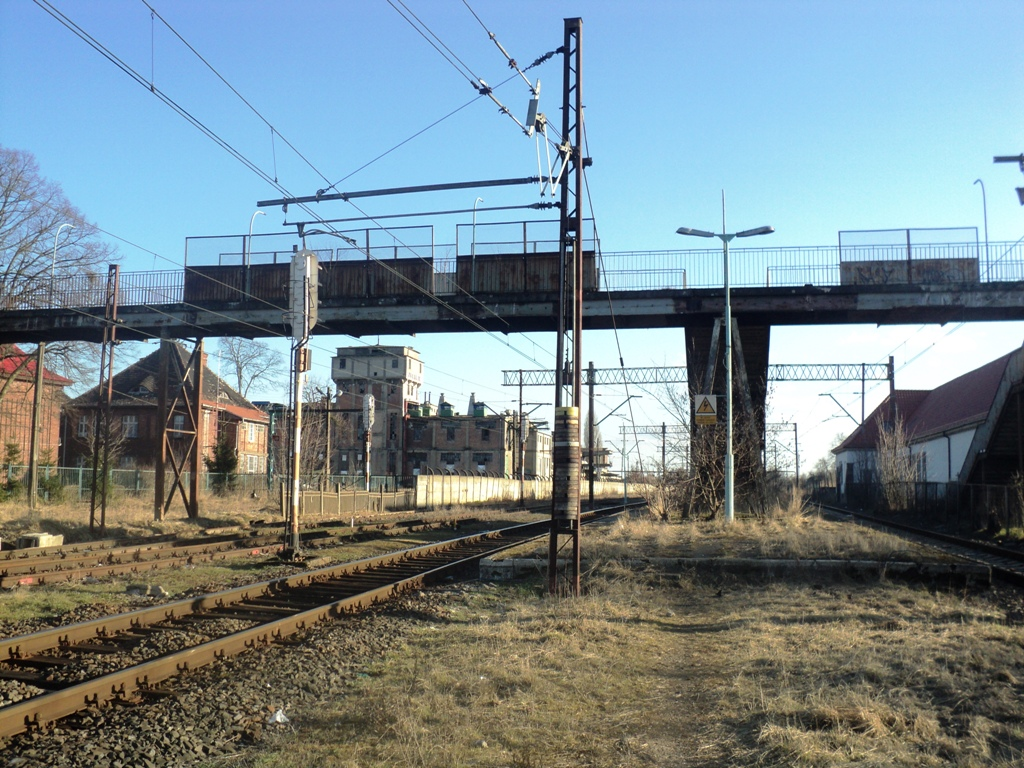
The Szczecin Skolwin railway station, opened in 1998 and closed in 2002.

In the 13th century, a hamlet with a manor house, then known as Cavelwisch, and now as Babin, was present to the east of the village of Skolwin (German: Scholwin), in the area of the current Stołczyńska and Cegłówki Streets, near the coast of the West Oder river. Its oldest known written records date to 1360, when duke Barnim III, the ruler of the Duchy of Pomerania-Stettin, granted its ownership to the Carthusian monastery in Grabowo (Grabow).

In 1898, the Szczecin Skolwin railway station was built near the villages of Skolwin and Babin, as part of the line between Szczecin Main Station and Trzebież. It was originally known as Cavelwisch until 1929, and as Odermünde from 1929 to 1945. It was closed down in 2002. The station is currently planned to be reopened in 2026, as part of the Szczecin Metropolitan Railway line.

In 1911, the Feldmühle paper and pulp mill was opened near Babin at the current 100 Stołczyńska Street. In the 1920s, two neighbourhoods were developed near Babin in the 1920s, for the employees of the paper and pulp mill. They were Stara Kolonia (German: Alt-Kolonie, lit. 'Old Colony'), located in the area of the current Celulozowa, and Stołczyńska Streets, and Nowa Kolonia (German: Neu-Kolonie, lit. 'New Colony'), now known as Kolonia Cegłówki, located in the area of the current Stołczyńska and Cegłówki Streets, and developed between 1920 and 1927. After the Second World War, the paper and pulp mill was reopened in 1952, under the name Fabryka Papieru Szczecin-Skolwin. It was again closed in 2008, and reopened in 2015 under new company, as Fabryka Papieru APIS.

On 15 October 1939, Babin was incorporated into the city of Szczecin (Stettin). On 26 April 1945, during the Second World War, the city was captured by the Red Army of the Soviet Union. It was placed under the Polish administration on 5 July 1945, while its suburbs, including Babin, were placed under the Soviet military occupation. The neighbourhood became part of the Police Enclave, an area of the occupation, which while officially part of the territory of Poland, was administrated as part of the Randow District in the Soviet occupation zone in Germany. It was created to facilitate the removal of the machinery and resources of the Hydrierwerke Pölitz AG factory in the nearby Police, and its transportation to the Soviet Union. Over 20,000 workers and prisoners of war from Germany worked on the project in the Police Enclave, while Polish population was not allowed to settle in the area. Its southern portion, including Babin, was abolished on 19 July 1946, and subsequently incorporated into the city. Following the end of the conflict, the German population either fled or was expelled from Szczecin, and was replaced by Polish settlers, who begun moving in to Babin following its incorporation.

In 1952, the Świt Szczecin association football club was founded, originally as a company team for the employees of the local paper and pulp mill. Since 2024, it competes in the Second League of the Polish football. It is based at 100 Stołczyńska Street next to the paper and pulp mill.

From 1955 to 1976, Babin was part of the neighbourhood of Skolwin, which formed one of the administrative subdivisions of the Nad Odrą district. On 28 November 1990, the area became part of the neighbourhood of Skolwin, established as one of the administrative subdivisions of the North district, being governed by an elected neighbourhood council.

In 2015, a portion of the land belonging to the complex of the Fabryka Papieru APIS paper mill was partitioned and sold to other companies, forming the Skolwin Industrial Park (Polish: Skolwiński Park Przemysłowy).

== Characteristics ==
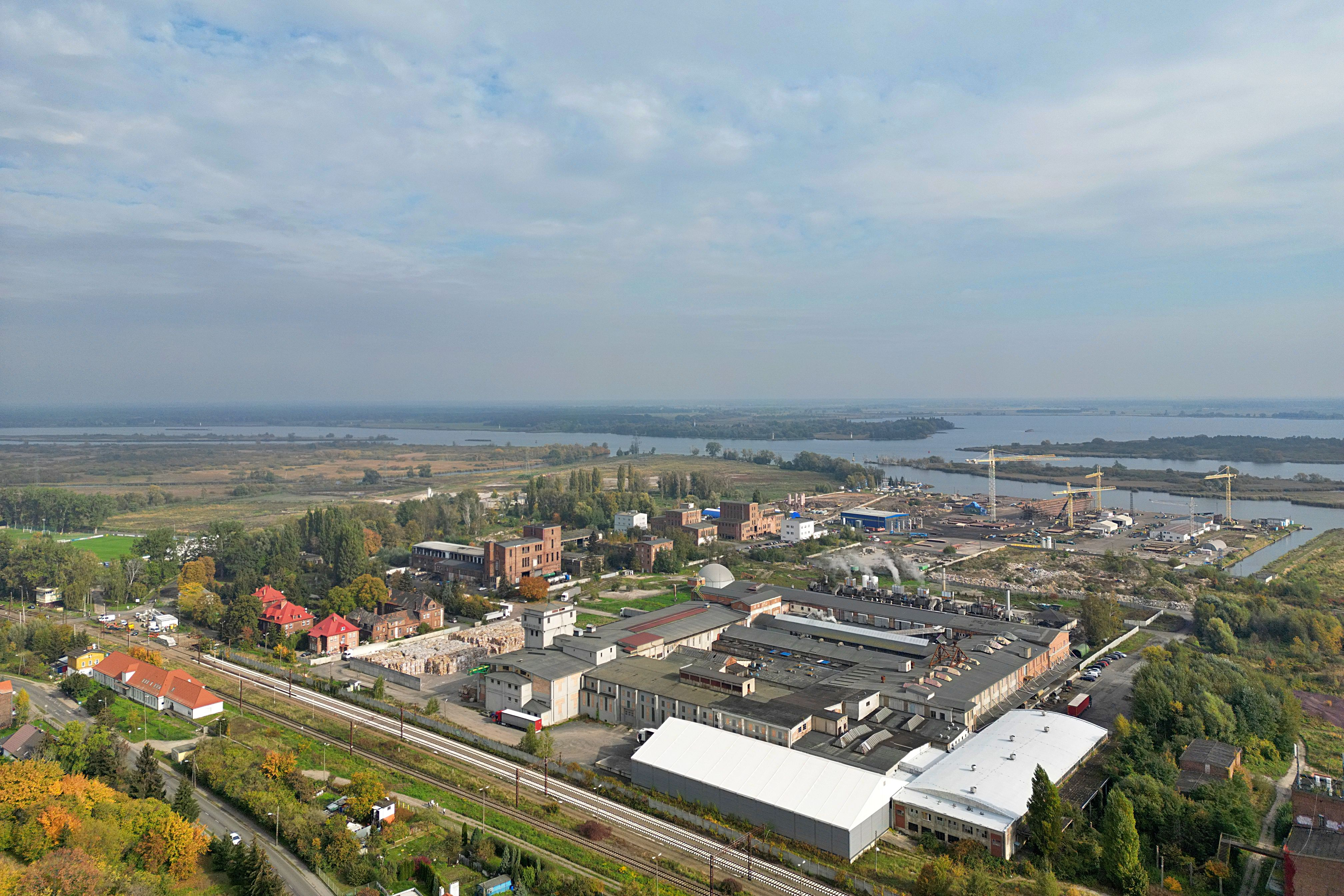
The complex of the Fabryka Papieru APIS paper mill in Skolwin, originally opened in 1911.

Babin is a residential area with single-family detached homes and tenements, located in the area of Stołczyńska and Cegłówki Streets, and near the coast of the West Oder river. In the area of Stołczyńska Street, it also has manufacturing industrial buildings, including the Fabryka Papieru APIS paper mill on 100 Stołczyńska Street, founded in 1911, as well as the area of the Skolwin Industrial Park (Polish: Skolwiński Park Przemysłowy). The neighbourhood is also crossed through by the railway line, which includes the Szczecin Skolwin, placed on Stołczyńska Street. It has been closed since 2002, and is currently planned to be reopened in 2026 as part of the Szczecin Metropolitan Railway line. In the south, the area is also crossed by the Skolwinka stream.

The neighbourhood also includes the Świt Szczecin association football club, based at 100 Stołczyńska Street. Founded in 1952, it currently competes in the Second League of the Polish football.
