= Przęsocin =

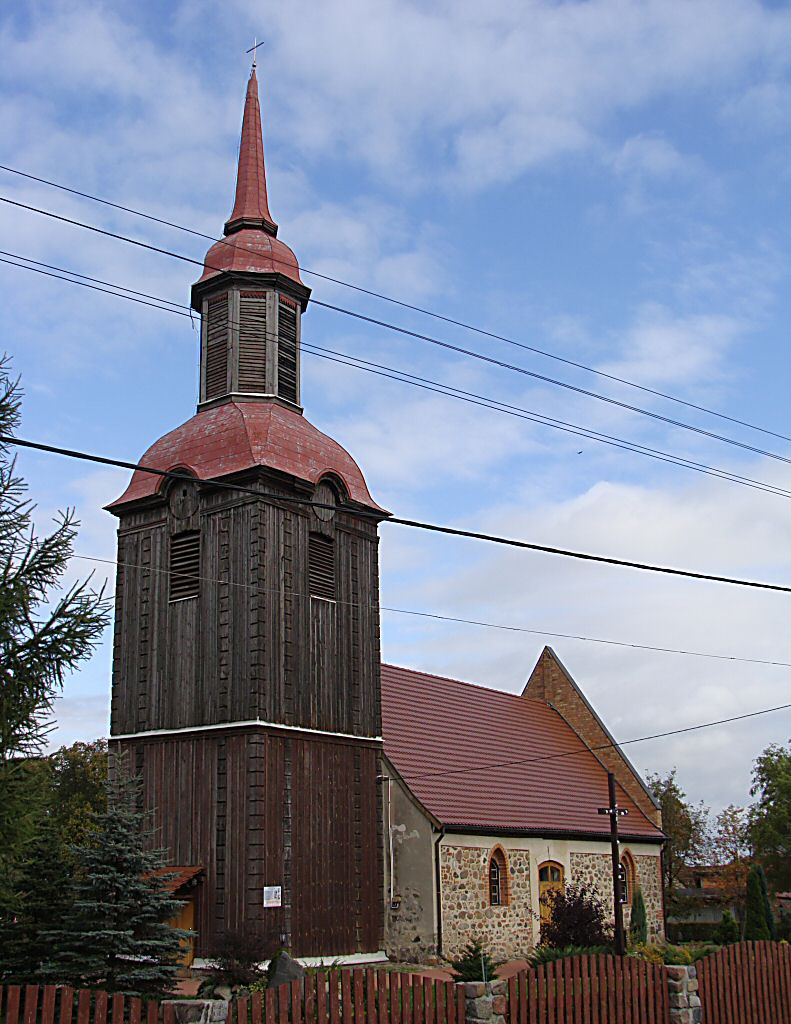
- Church of the Assumption in Przęsocin

- Location within Poland
- Coordinates: 53°31′N 14°34′E
- Country: Poland
- Voivodeship: West Pomeranian
- County: Police
- Gmina: Police
- Time zone: UTC+1 (CET)
  - Summer (DST): UTC+2 (CEST)
- Area code: +48 091
- Car Plates: ZPL

Przęsocin [pʂɛ̃ˈsɔt͡ɕin] (German: Neuendorf) is a village in Police County in the West Pomeranian Voivodeship in north-eastern Poland, south of the town of Police.

== History ==
In the 10th century, the area became part of the emerging Polish state under its first historic ruler Mieszko I. Following the fragmentation of Poland into smaller duchies, it was part of the Duchy of Pomerania, and later on also passed to Sweden, Prussia and Germany. It became again part of Poland in 1945, following the defeat of Nazi Germany.

== Notable residents ==
- Artur Bahr (1920–1944), officer

== Tourism ==
- Church from 15th century built with granite
- PTTK path (red footpath "Ścieżkami Dzików") in an area of Przęsocin in Wkrzanska Forest

== Communication ==
- bus lines to Police, Poland:
  - 101 to Police, Poland: Mścięcino, the Old Town and Jasienica
  - 107 to Police, Poland: Mścięcino, the Old Town and the New Town
- bus lines to Szczecin:
  - 101 to Szczecin: Szczecin-Bukowo, Szczecin-Żelechowa, Centrum
  - 107 to Szczecin: Szczecin-Bukowo, Szczecin-Żelechowa, Centrum
