= Stettin (region) =

Territorial division of Prussian Pomerania

Administrative divisions of the Province of Pomerania (1939).

The Region of Stettin (German: Regierungsbezirk Stettin, Polish: rejencja szczecińska) was a unit of territorial division in the Prussian Province of Pomerania, with Prussia forming part of the German Empire from 1871. It was established in 1816 and existed until 1945. On 1 October 1932 the Stralsund Region was incorporated into the Stettin Region. The Region included all of Western and large parts of Central Pomerania.

The seat of the regional president's office (Regierungspräsidium; literally 'Government Presidium') was in the city of Stettin (modern Szczecin). Initially it was located in the Ducal Castle, in 1911 it moved to new premises, now used as the West Pomeranian Voivodeship Office in Poland.
