= Mścięcino =

District in Police, Poland

- District
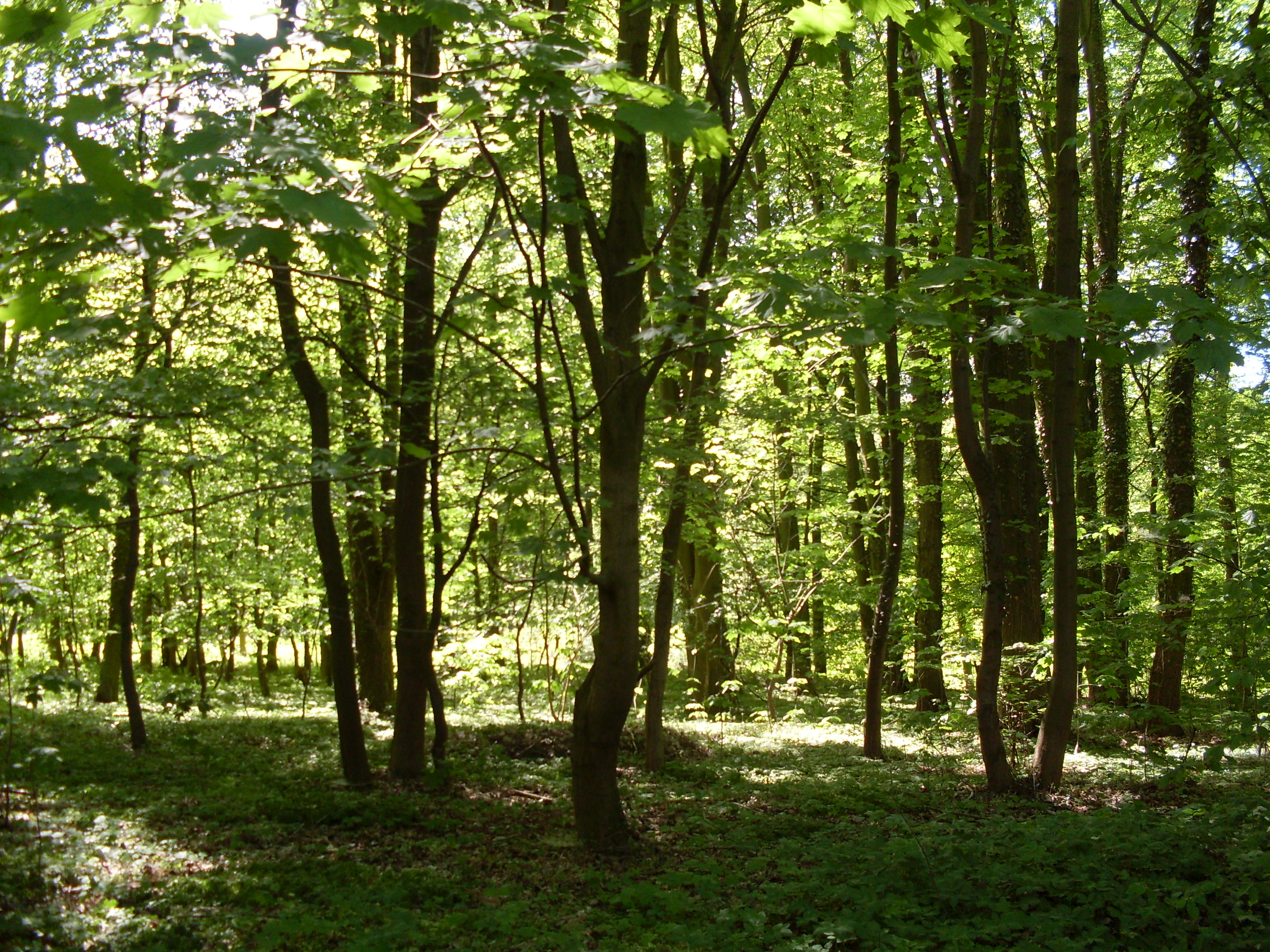
- Mścięcino Park in the Wkrzanska Forest, a part near a border between Szczecin and Police

- Location within Poland
- Coordinates: 53°32′32.26″N 14°34′46.32″E
- Country: Poland
- Voivodeship: West Pomeranian
- City: Police
- Time zone: UTC+1:00 (CET)
  - Summer (DST): UTC+2:00 (CEST)

Mścięcino (Polish: [mɕt͡ɕɛɲˈt͡ɕi.nɔ]) is a neighbourhood of the town of Police in West Pomeranian Voivodeship, Poland.

== Communication ==
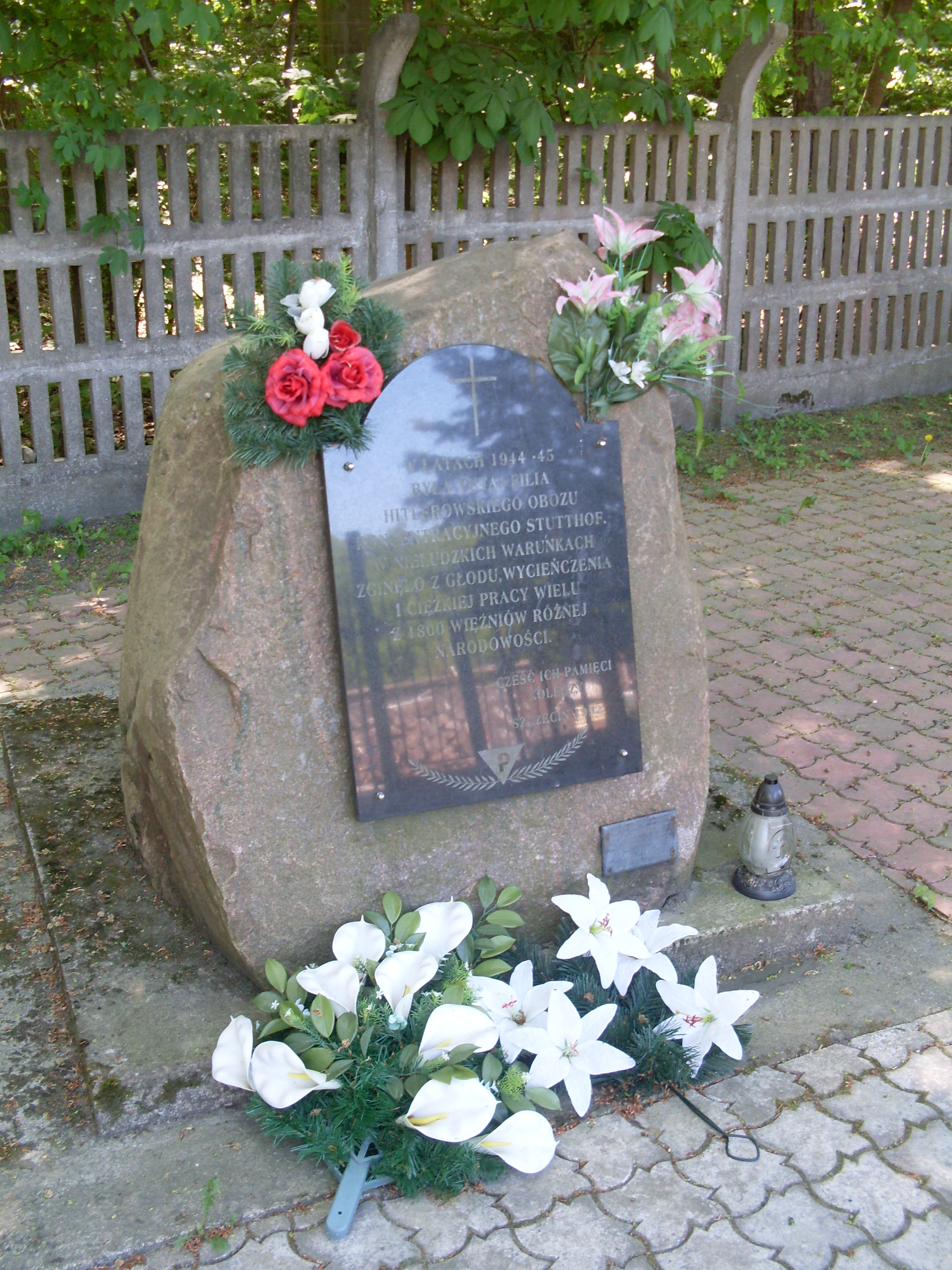
Monument in honor of the victims of the branch of Stutthof concentration camp in Mścięcino

- Roads:
  - from the centre of Police to Przęsocin and Szczecin
- Main streets in a district:
  - ul. Asfaltowa
  - ul. Cisowa
- Szczecin - Police - Trzebież Railway
- Public transport:
  - bus lines 101 (to the Old Town of Police, Przęsocin and a centre of Szczecin), 102 (to the Old Town and the New Town of Police and Szczecin-Skolwin and Szczecin-Gocław), 107 (to the New Town of Police, Przęsocin and a centre of Szczecin)
