= Old Town, Police =

Coordinates: 53°33′08″N 14°34′21″E

Police Old Town is the old town (oldest historic district) of Police, Poland, located in the Pomerania Region.

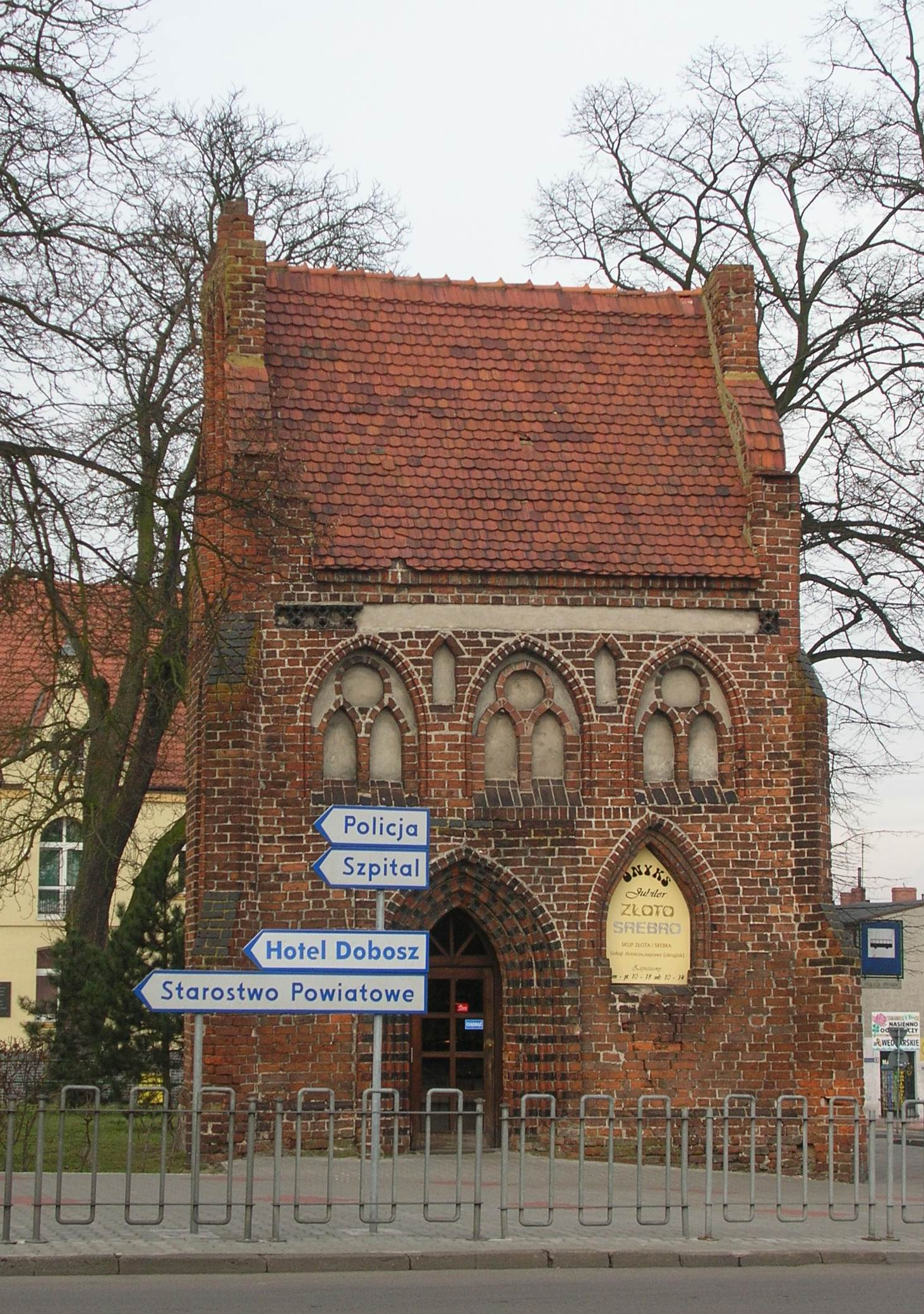
Police, Gothic Chapel (15th century) in The Chrobry Square in The Old Town of Police, a town in Pomerania, Poland

== Monuments ==
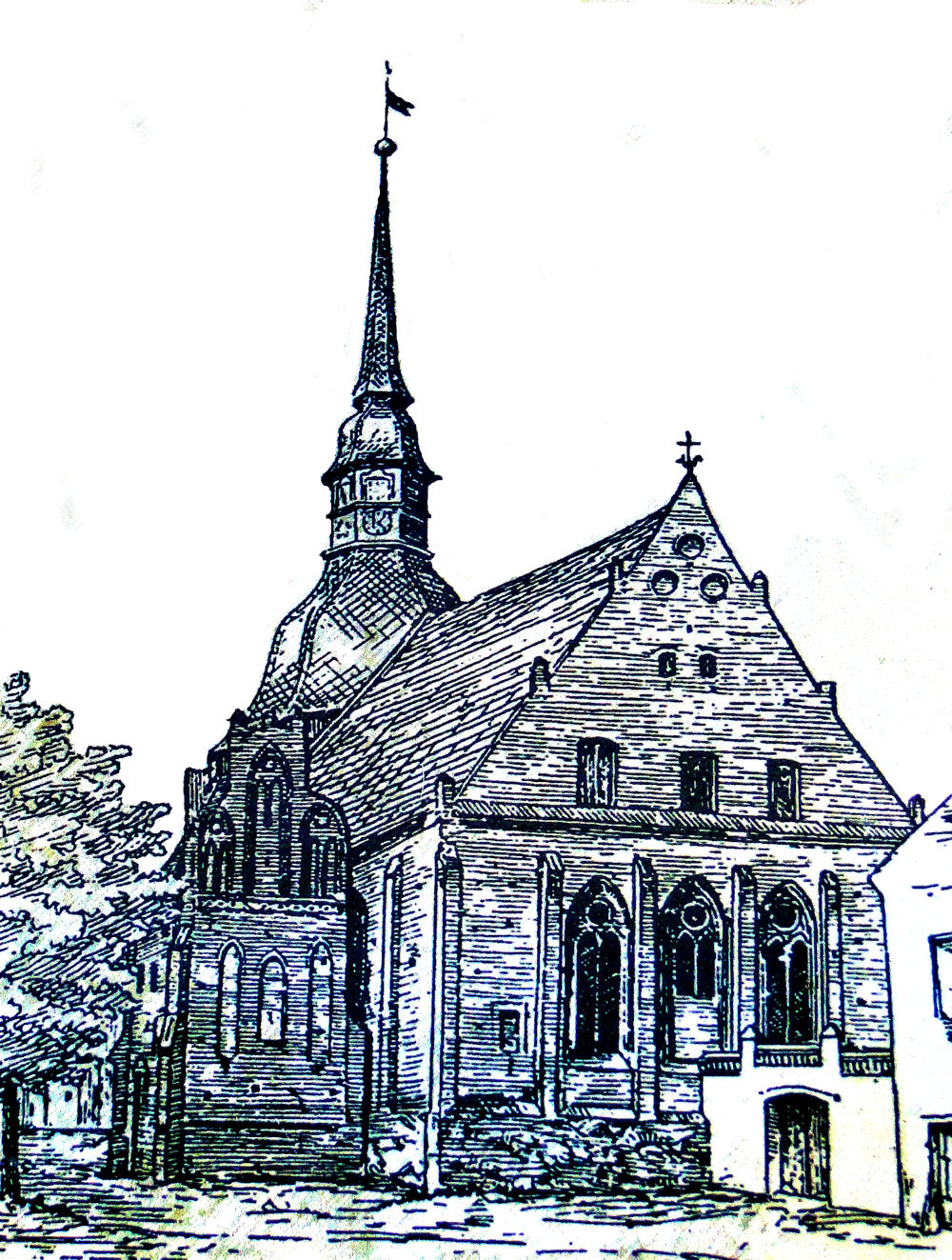
A former gothic St. Mary's Church in The Old Town of Police, 1884

Some monuments in Police include:

- A Brick Gothic chapel (15th century) in Chrobry Square
- A Neo-Gothic church (19th century)
- the Police Lapidary in Staromiejski Park
- 19th century tenement houses

The town hall from 1906 was not rebuilt after World War II.

The tourist and cultural information office is located in the Gothic chapel in Bolesław Chrobry Square.

== Yacht marina ==
A yacht marina 'Olimpia' is on the Łarpia River (part of Oder).

== Transportation ==
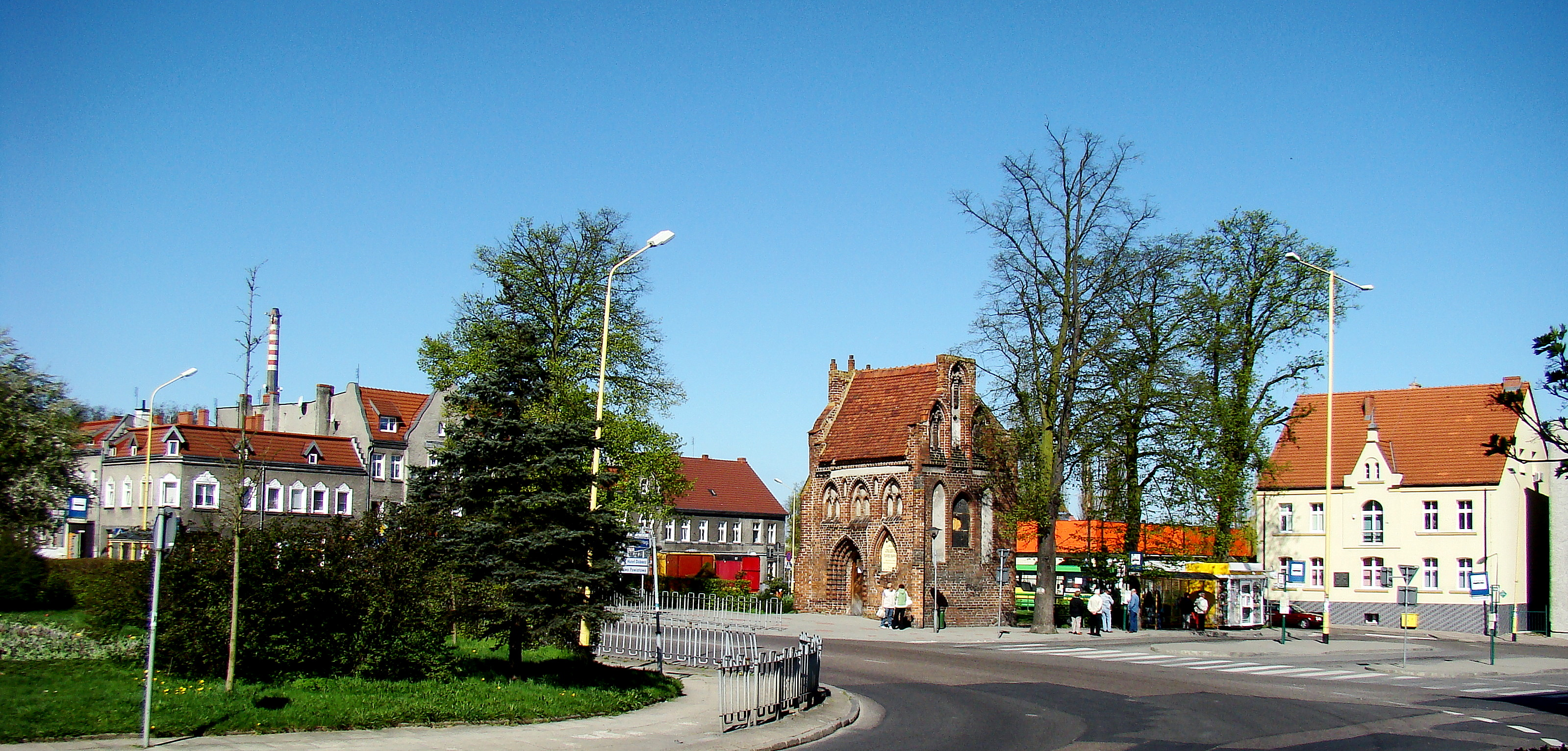
The Old Town Square

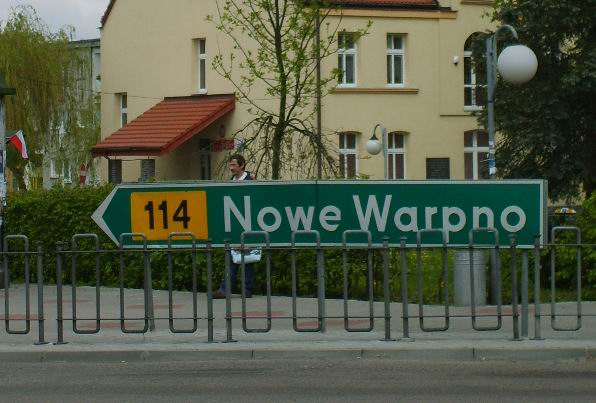
A fingerpost in the Old Town Square

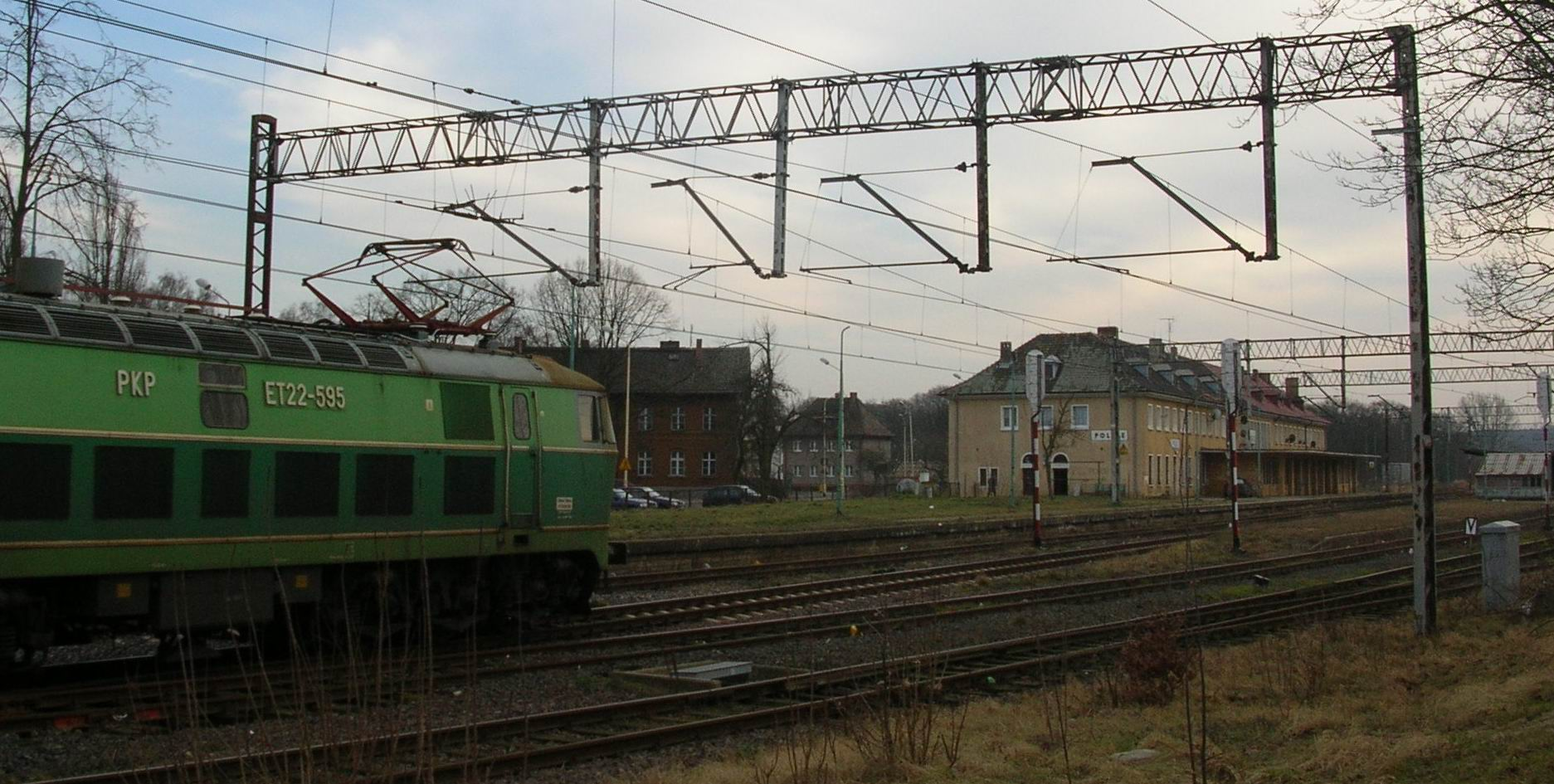
The Main Railway Station in Police

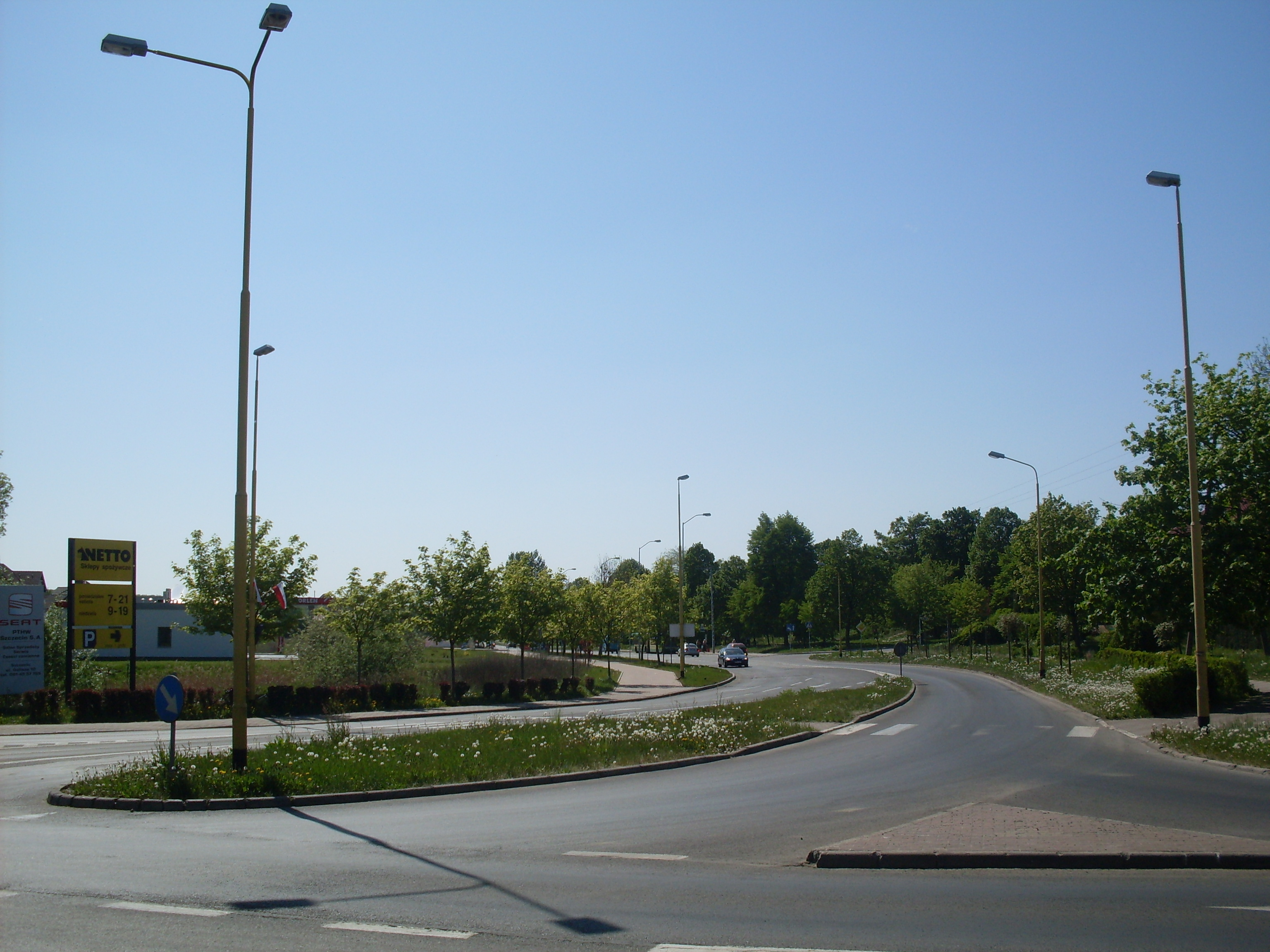
Piłsudskiego Street

- Roads:
  - to Trzebież and Nowe Warpno, No. 114
  - to Tanowo, No. 114
  - to Szczecin over Przęsocin
- Main streets in a town:
  - ul. Grunwaldzka
  - ul. Kościuszki
  - ul. Wojska Polskiego
  - ul. Piłsudskiego
- Szczecin - Police - Trzebież Railway
- Harbours:
  - Police Sea-Harbour
  - Police River-Harbour
- Public transport:
  - bus lines 101, 102, 103, 106, 109, 110, 111. Bus communication between all districts of a town, a few villages near Police (Trzeszczyn, Tanowo, Siedlice, Leśno Górne, Pilchowo, Przęsocin and Szczecin City
  - LS (linia samorządowa)(different type of ticket) to Trzebież over Dębostrów, Niekłończyca and Uniemyśl)
  - Taxicab
