= Drogoradz, West Pomeranian Voivodeship =

Drogoradz
- Village
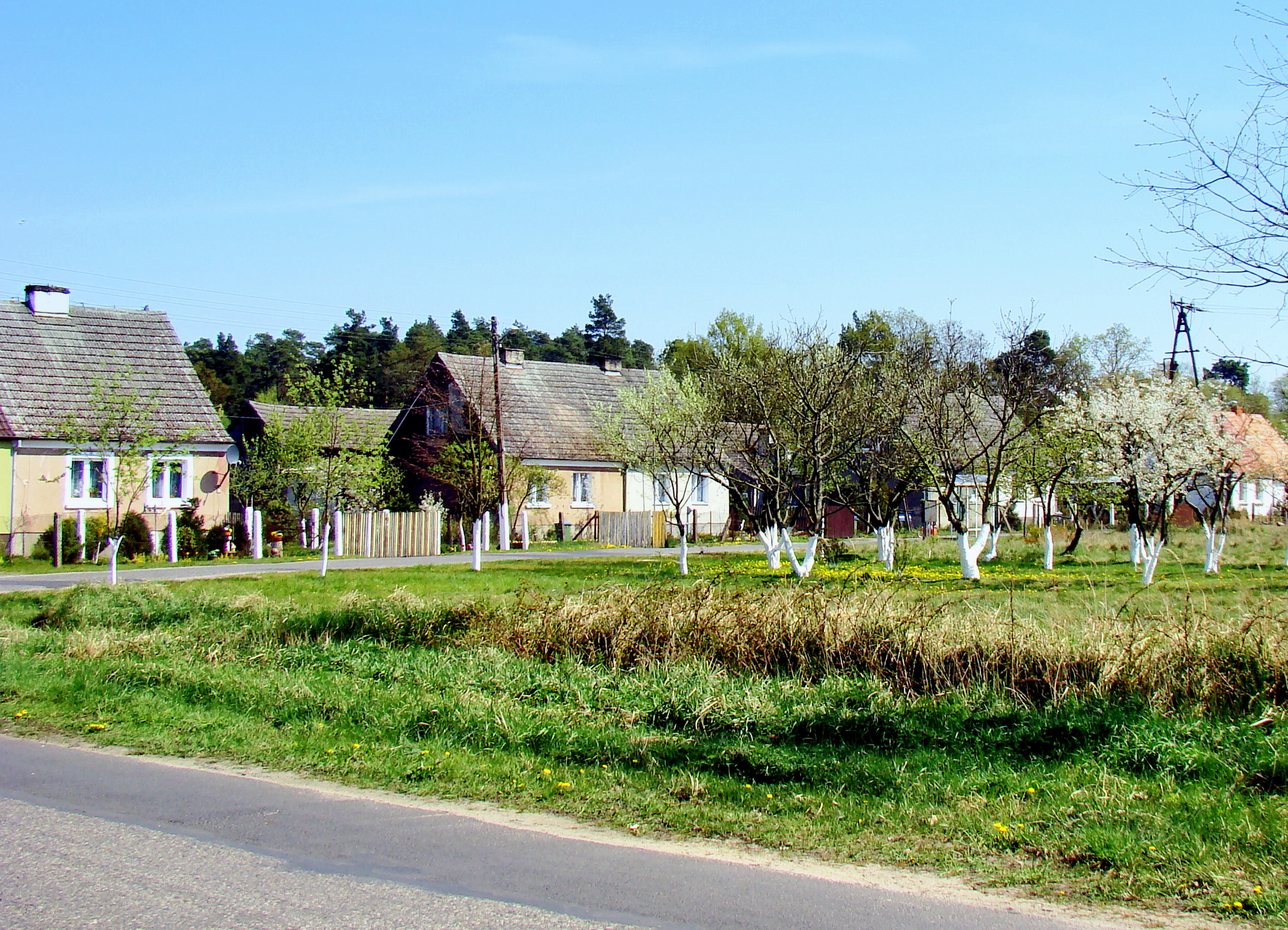
- Drogoradz, West Pomeranian Voivodeship

- Location within Poland
- Coordinates: 53°37′48″N 14°28′5″E
- Country: Poland
- Voivodeship: West Pomeranian
- County: Police
- Gmina: Police
- Population: 250

Drogoradz [drɔˈɡɔrat͡s] (German: Hammer, Amt Jasenitz) is a village in the administrative district of Gmina Police, within Police County, West Pomeranian Voivodeship, in north-western Poland, close to the German border. It lies approximately 13 km (8 mi) north-west of Police and 25 km (16 mi) north of the regional capital Szczecin.

== History ==
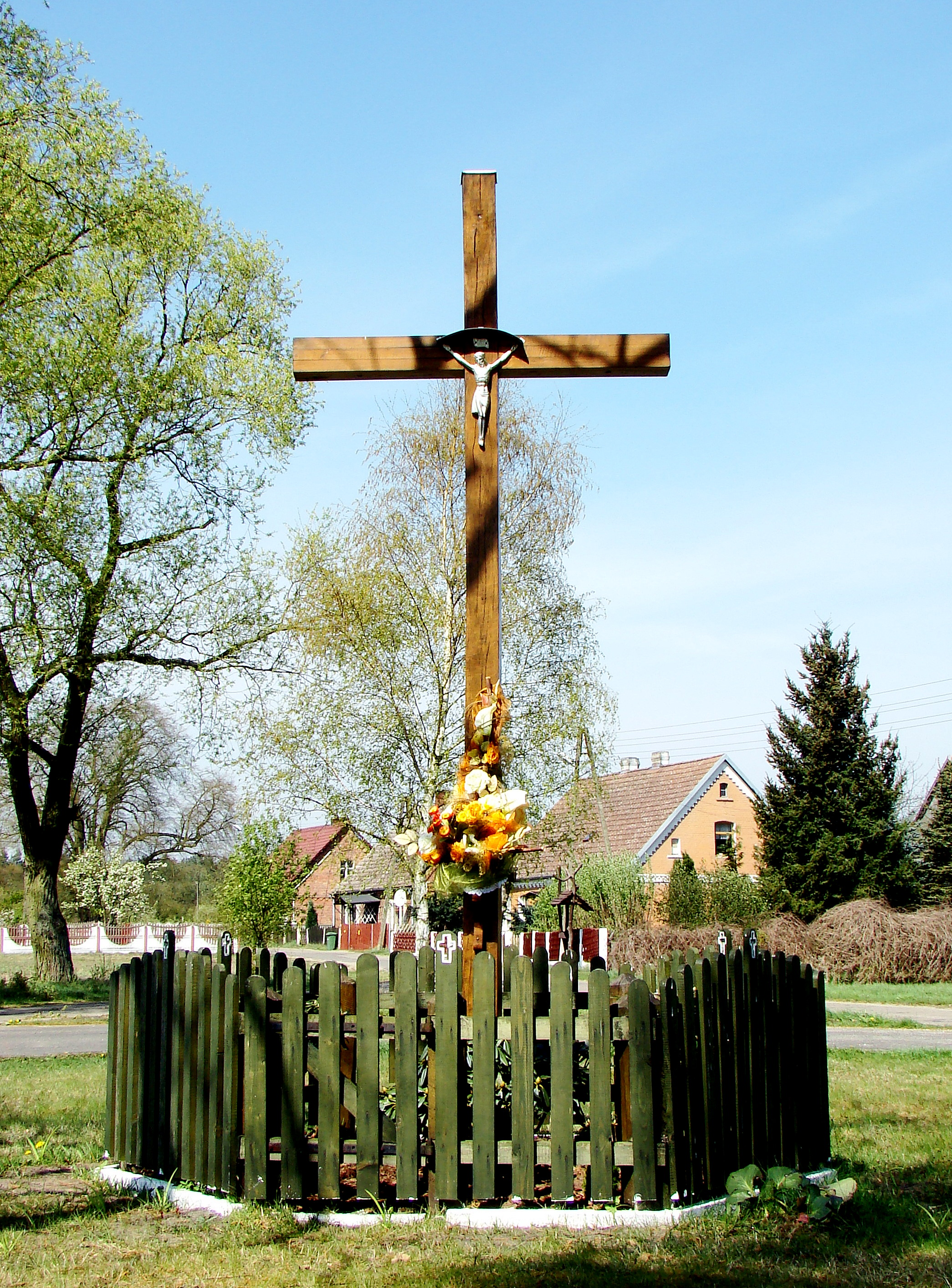
Drogoradz, Christian cross

For the history of the region, see History of Pomerania.

Drogoradz, known as Hammer to its residents while being part of Germany in 1815–1945, became part of Poland after the end of World War II and changed its name to the Polish Drogoradz.

Below is a timeline showing the history of the different administrations that this city has been included in.

Political-administrative membership

- 1815 – 1866: German Confederation, Kingdom of Prussia, Pomerania
- 1866 – 1871: North German Confederation, Kingdom of Prussia, Pomerania
- 1871 – 1918: German Empire, Kingdom of Prussia, Pomerania
- 1919 – 1933: Weimarer Republik, Free State of Prussia, Pomerania
- 1933 – 1945: Nazi Germany, Pomerania
- 1945 – 1946: Enclave Police, (the area reporting to the Red Army)
- 1946 – 1952: People's Republic of Poland, Szczecin Voivodeship
- 1952 – 1975: People's Republic of Poland, Szczecin Voivodeship
- 1975 – 1989: People's Republic of Poland, Szczecin Voivodeship
- 1989 – 1998: Poland, Szczecin Voivodeship
- 1999 – Current: Poland, Western Pomerania, powiat Police County, gmina Police

Demography

- The village has a population:
  - 1939 – 505
  - 1972 – 350
  - 2006 – 250

== Tourism ==
- PTTK path (green footpath Trail of Ornithologists-Szlak Ornitologów) in an area of Drogoradz in Wkrzanska Forest.

== See also ==
- Police
- Szczecin
