= Nowa Jasienica =

- Settlement
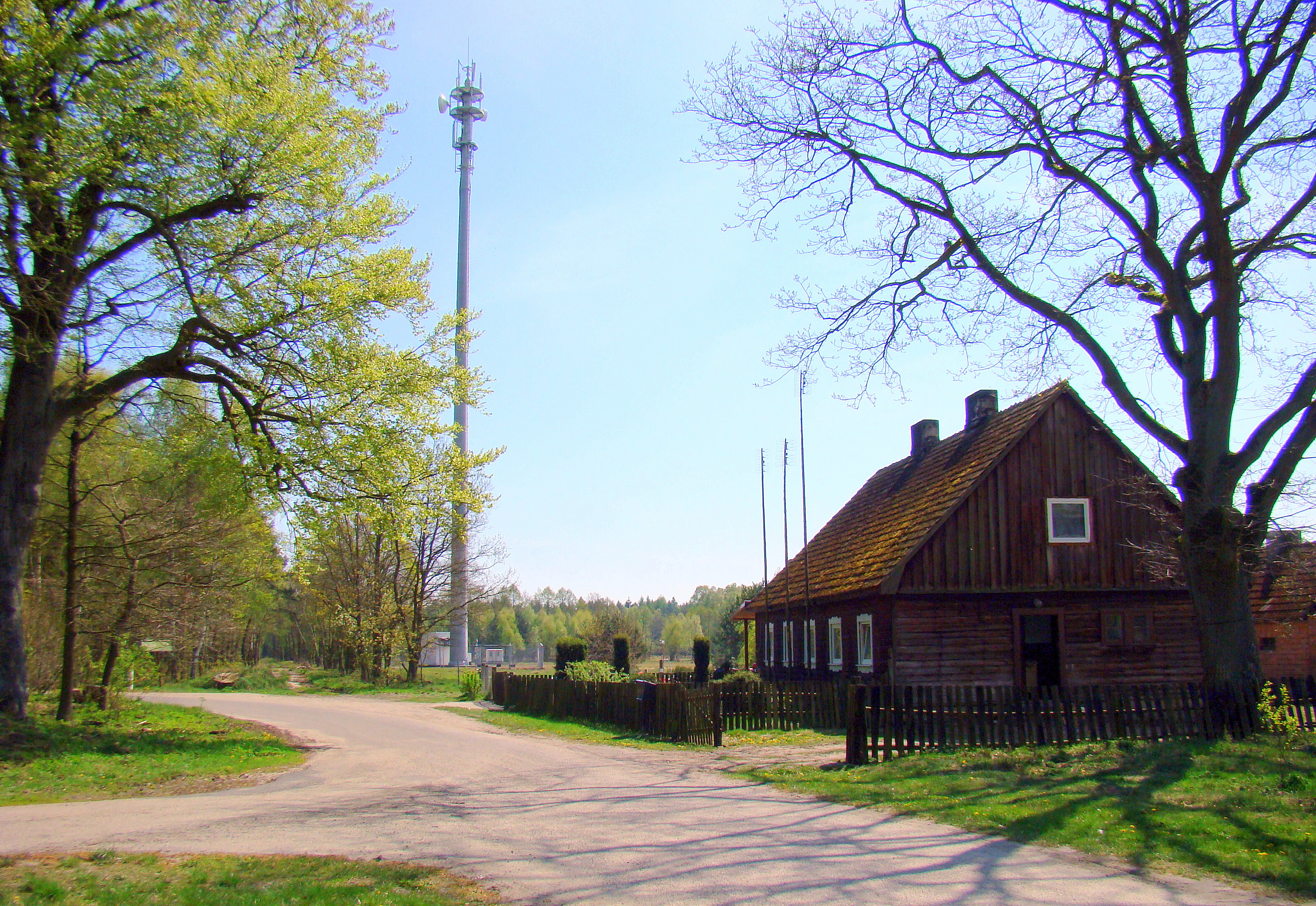
- Nowa Jasienica

- Location within Poland
- Coordinates: 53°36′26″N 14°26′50″E
- Country: Poland
- Voivodeship: West Pomeranian
- County: Police
- Gmina: Police

Nowa Jasienica [ˈnɔva jaɕɛˈnit͡sa] (formerly German Neu Jasenitz) - is a settlement in the administrative district of Gmina Police, within Police County, West Pomeranian Voivodeship, in north-western Poland, close to the German border. It lies approximately 12 km (7 mi) north-west of Police and 23 km (14 mi) north-west of the regional capital Szczecin.

== History ==
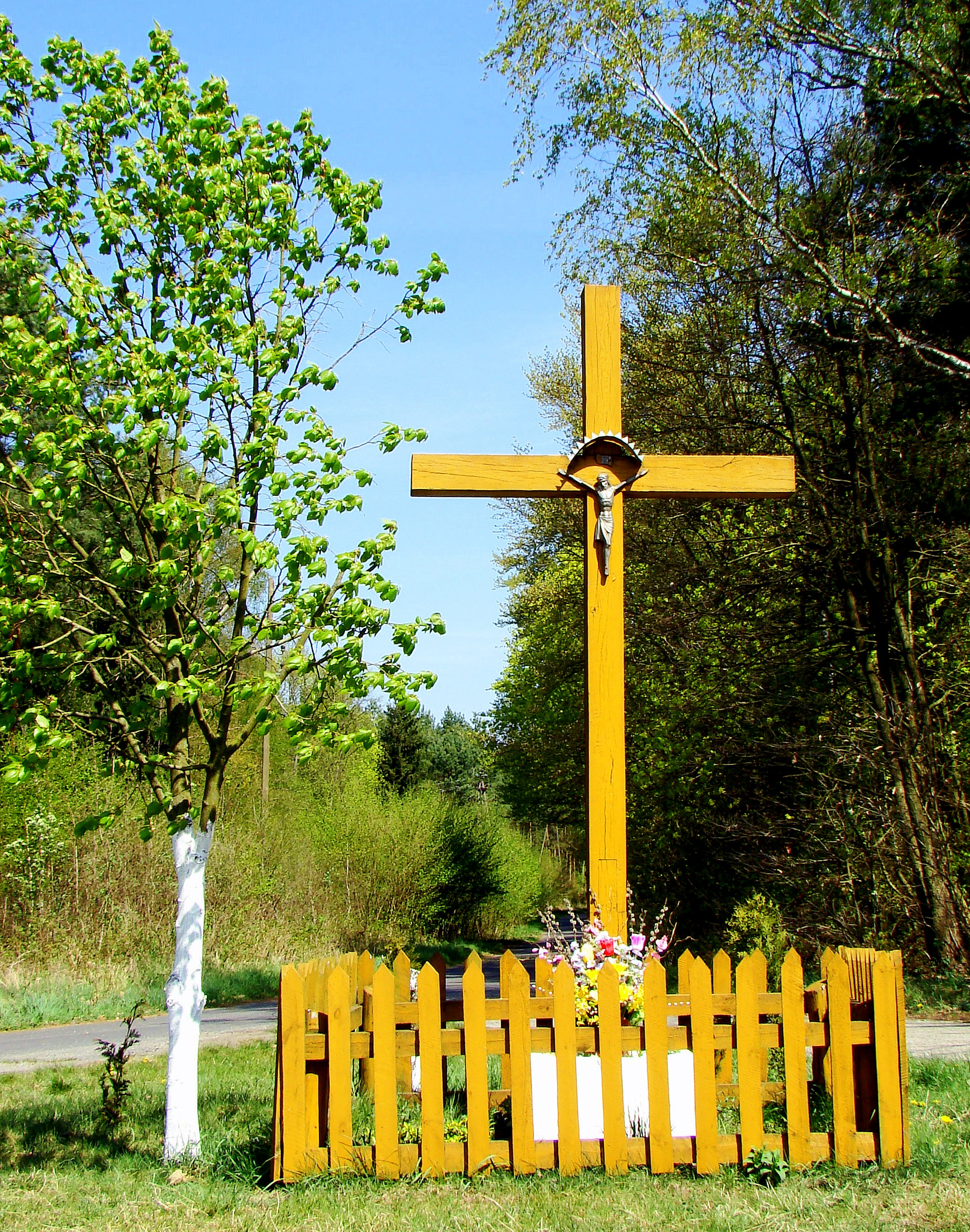
Nowa Jasienica, Christian cross

For the history of the region, see History of Pomerania.

Nowa Jasienica, known as Neu Jasenitz to its residents while part of Germany, became part of Poland after the end of World War II and changed its name to the Polish Nowa Jasienica.

Below is a timeline showing the history of the different administrations that this city has been included in.

Political-administrative membership

- 1815 - 1866: German Confederation, Kingdom of Prussia, Pomerania
- 1866 - 1871: North German Confederation, Kingdom of Prussia, Pomerania
- 1871 - 1918: German Empire, Kingdom of Prussia, Pomerania
- 1919 - 1933: Weimarer Republik, Free State of Prussia, Pomerania
- 1933 - 1945: Nazi Germany, Pomerania
- 1945 - 1946: Enclave Police, (the area reporting to the Red Army)
- 1946 - 1952: People's Republic of Poland, Szczecin Voivodeship
- 1952 - 1975: People's Republic of Poland, Szczecin Voivodeship
- 1975 - 1989: People's Republic of Poland, Szczecin Voivodeship
- 1989 - 1998: Poland, Szczecin Voivodeship
- 1999 - Current: Poland, Western Pomerania, powiat Police County, gmina Police

Demography

- The village has a population:
  - 1786 – 38
  - 1939 – 40
  - 1972 – 30

== Tourism ==
- PTTK path (black footpath Szlak Parków i Pomników Przyrody) in an area of Nowa Jasienica in Wkrzanska Forest.

== See also ==
- Police
- Szczecin
