= Symbols of Police County =

Symbols of Gdańsk County, Poland

Coat of arms of Police County
- Armiger: Police County
- Adopted: 20 December 2002
- Designer: Radosław Gaziński

Police County
- Use: civil flag
- Proportion: 1:1
- Adopted: 28 June 2000
- Designed by: Radosław Gaziński
- Use: state flag
- Proportion: 1:1
- Adopted: 28 June 2000
- Designed by: Radosław Gaziński

The coat of arms and flag that serve as the symbols of the Police County, in West Pomeranian Voivodeship, Poland were established on 28 June 2000. They were designed by Radosław Gaziński.

== Design ==
The coat of arms of the Police County consists of an Iberian style escutcheon (shield) with square top and rounded base, that is divided into 4 equally-sized fields distributed in two rows each containing two fields. They alter between white and blue colours. In top left white field is placed griffin that is covered in 4 sqewed horizontal stripes alternating between red and green colours. It stands on its back legs and faces left. In the top right blue field is placed an image of Mary, mother of Jesus in white robes, holding infant Christ Child. They both have light pink skin, yellow (golden) hair, and yellow (golden) aureolas behind their heads. In the bottom left blue field is a white (silver) fish facing left. In the bottom right white field is a branch of the oak tree, with foliage and two acorns.

The county civil flag of the county is a square divided into 4 equally-sized fields distributed in two rows each containing two fields. They alter between white and blue colours. The proportions of the flag have the aspect ratio of its height to its wight equal 1:1. The state flag features the county coat of arms in the centre.

The white and blue colours were historically present in the coat of arms of Pomerania, and the flag of the Province of Pomerania, used from 1882 to 1935. The red and green griffin is the historical symbol of the Lands of Schlawe and Stolp, and in the coat of arms, is meant to symbolize the tribes of Pomeranians that historically inhabited the modern area of the county. Marry wish Jesus symbolize the canon regular monastery in Jasienica. The fish symbolizes the fishery industry, important to the population around the Szczecin Lagoon. The branch of the oak tree symbolizes the Ueckermünde Heath, which is partially located within the county.

== History ==
The county coat of arms and flags were established by the county council on 28 June 2000, via the regulation approved on 14 September 1999. They were designed by Radosław Gaziński.

== See also ==
- coat of arms of Police
