= Podbrzezie, West Pomeranian Voivodeship =

Podbrzezie
- Settlement
- Location within Poland
- Coordinates: 53°35′7.66″N 14°22′53.83″E
- Country: Poland
- Voivodeship: West Pomeranian
- County: Police
- Gmina: Police

Podbrzezie [pɔdˈbʐɛʑɛ] (German: Neuhaus) is a settlement in the administrative district of Gmina Police, within Police County, West Pomeranian Voivodeship, in north-western Poland, close to the German border.

For the history of the region, see History of Pomerania.
