= Mazańczyce =

- Settlement
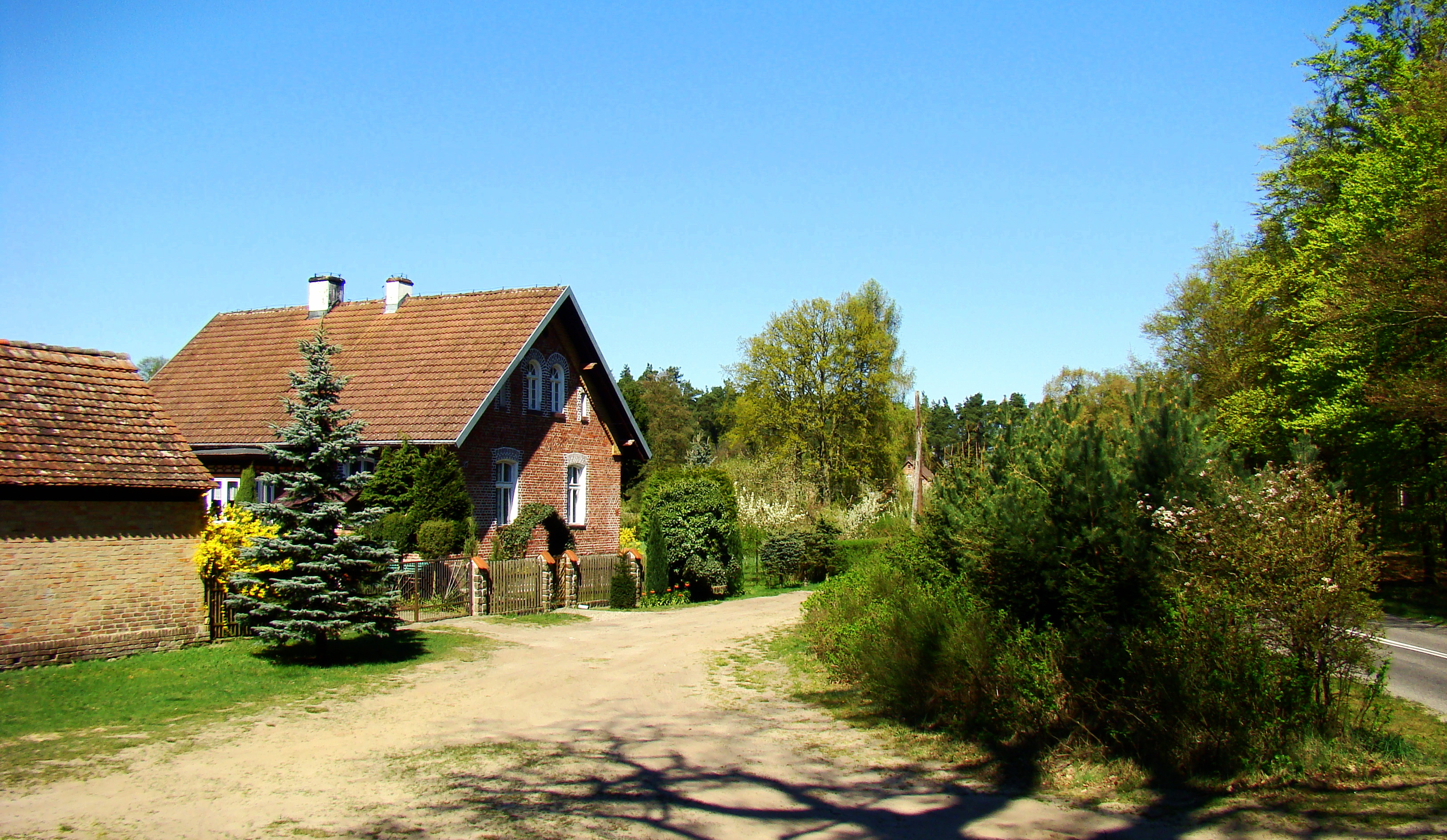

- Location within Poland
- Coordinates: 53°38′27″N 14°30′14″E
- Country: Poland
- Voivodeship: West Pomeranian
- County: Police
- Gmina: Police
- Population: 6

Mazańczyce [mazaɲˈt͡ʂɨt͡sɛ] (German: Neu Ziegenort) is a settlement in the administrative district of Gmina Police, within Police County, West Pomeranian Voivodeship, in north-western Poland, close to the German border. It lies approximately 13 km (8 mi) north of Police and 26 km (16 mi) north of the regional capital Szczecin.

For the history of the region, see History of Pomerania.

The settlement has a population of 6.
