= Turznica, West Pomeranian Voivodeship =

Turznica
- Settlement
- Location within Poland
- Coordinates: 53°35′52.87″N 14°30′28.61″E
- Country: Poland
- Voivodeship: West Pomeranian
- County: Police
- Gmina: Police

Turznica [tuʐˈnit͡sa] (German: Forsthaus Arneburg) is a settlement in the administrative district of Gmina Police, within Police County, West Pomeranian Voivodeship, in north-western Poland, close to the German border.

For the history of the region, see History of Pomerania.
