= Niekłończyca =

- Village
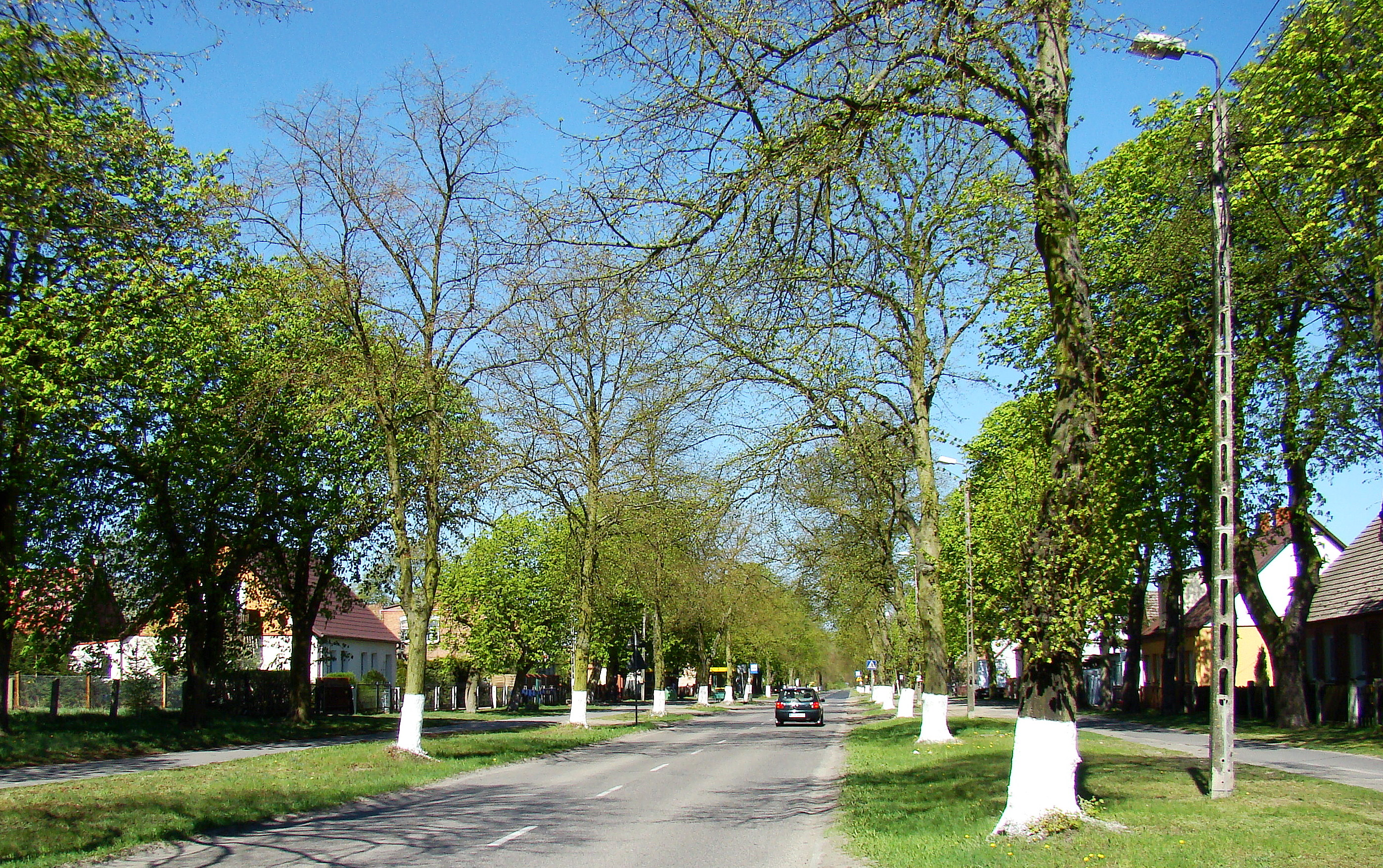
- Niekłończyca

- Location within Poland
- Coordinates: 53°36′55″N 14°30′35″E
- Country: Poland
- Voivodeship: West Pomeranian
- County: Police
- Gmina: Police
- Population (2006): 390

Niekłończyca [ɲɛkwɔɲˈt͡ʂɨt͡sa] (German: Königsfelde) is a village in the administrative district of Gmina Police, within Police County, West Pomeranian Voivodeship, in north-western Poland, close to the German border. It lies approximately 10 km (6 mi) north-west of Police and 23 km (14 mi) north of the regional capital Szczecin.

== History ==
First references to Niekłończyca (Königsfelde) came from 1750. Niekłończyca, known as Königsfelde to its residents while part of Germany from 1815 to 1945, became part of Poland after the end of World War II and changed its name to the Polish Niekłończyca.

Below is a time line showing the history of the different administrations that this city has been included in.

Political-administrative membership:

- 1815–1866: German Confederation, Kingdom of Prussia, Pomerania
- 1866–1871: North German Confederation, Kingdom of Prussia, Pomerania
- 1871–1918: German Empire, Kingdom of Prussia, Pomerania
- 1919–1933: Weimar Republic, Free State of Prussia, Pomerania
- 1933–1945: Nazi Germany, Pomerania
- 1945–1946: Enclave of Police (the area reporting to the Red Army)
- 1946–1989: People's Republic of Poland, Szczecin Voivodeship
- 1989–1998: Poland, Szczecin Voivodeship
- 1999–present: Poland, West Pomeranian Voivodeship, Police County

=== Monuments ===
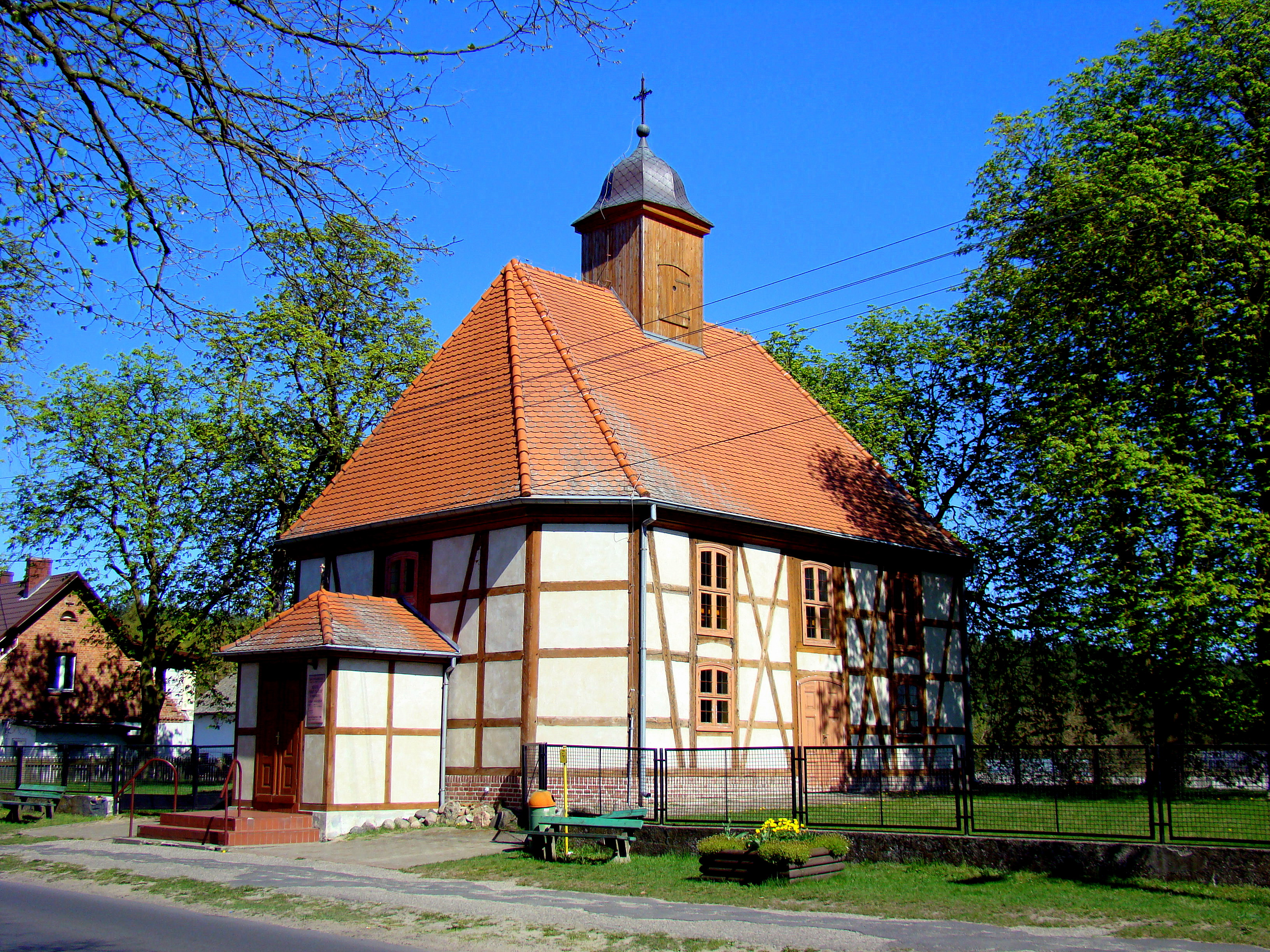
Church in Niekłończyca

- Baroque church (1787)
- Houses from the 19th and the 20th century

=== Demography ===
The population of Niekłończyca:

- 1863 – 385
- 1939 – 625
- 2001 – 350
- 2006 – 390

== Tourism ==
- Bicycle trail (red Trail "Puszcza Wkrzańska"-Szlak "Puszcza Wkrzańska") in an area of Niekłończyca in Wkrzanska Forest.

== See also ==
- Police, Poland
- Szczecin
