= Bartoszewo, West Pomeranian Voivodeship =

Bartoszewo
- Village
- Location within Poland
- Coordinates: 53°31′8″N 14°27′25″E
- Country: Poland
- Voivodeship: West Pomeranian
- County: Police
- Gmina: Police
- Population: 150

Bartoszewo [bartɔˈʂɛvɔ] (formerly German Barm) is a village in the administrative district of Gmina Police, within Police County, West Pomeranian Voivodeship, in north-western Poland, close to the German border. It lies approximately 8 km (5 mi) west of Police and 15 km (9 mi) north-west of the regional capital Szczecin.

For the history of the region, see History of Pomerania.

The village has a population of 150.
