= Karpin, Police County =

Karpin
- Settlement
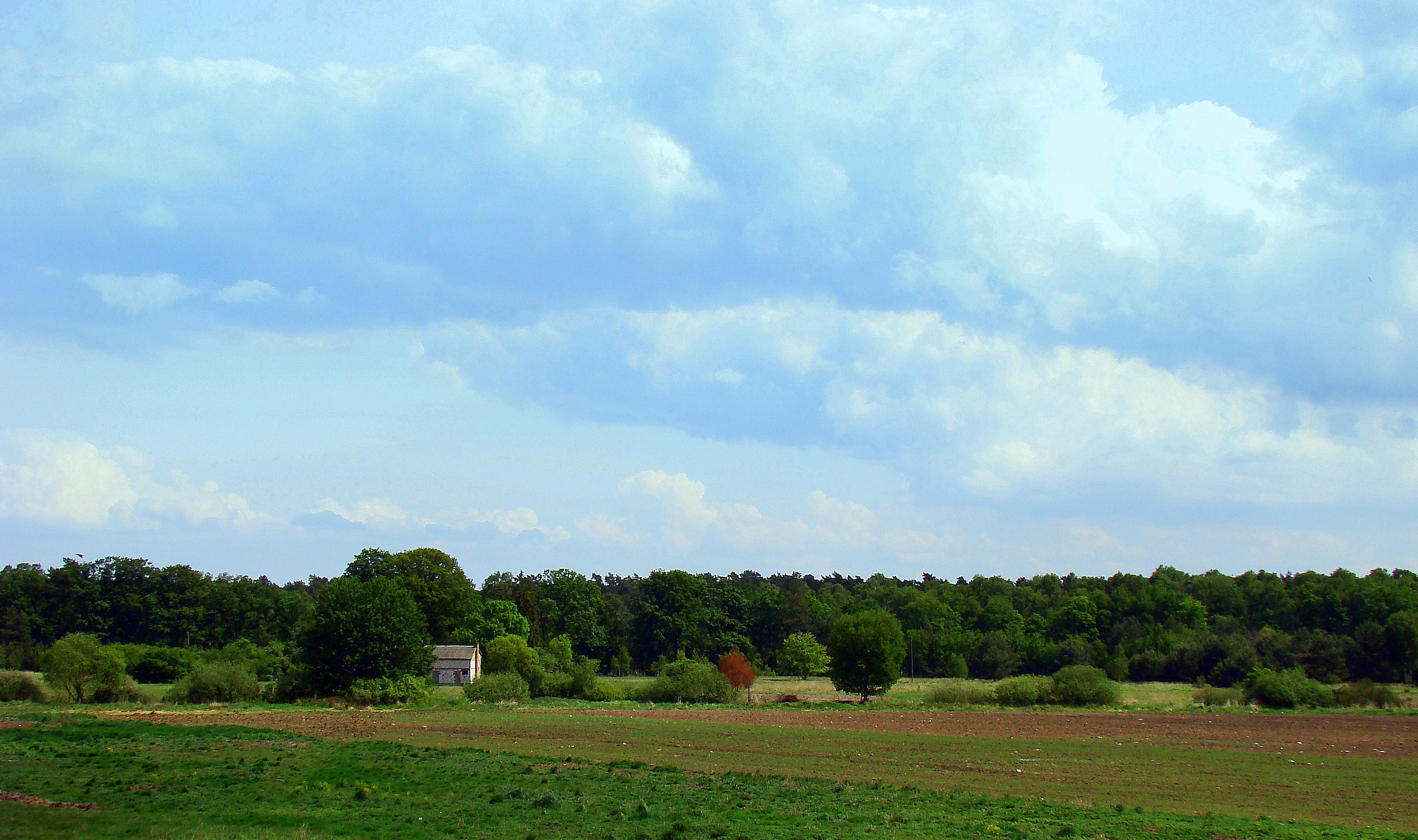
- Karpin, general view

- Location within Poland
- Coordinates: 53°37′33″N 14°25′1″E
- Country: Poland
- Voivodeship: West Pomeranian
- County: Police
- Gmina: Police

Karpin [ˈkarpin] (German: Karpin) is a settlement in the administrative district of Gmina Police, within Police County, West Pomeranian Voivodeship, in north-western Poland, close to the German border. It lies approximately 15 km (9 mi) north-west of Police and 26 km (16 mi) north-west of the regional capital Szczecin.

== History ==
For the history of the region, see History of Pomerania.

Below is a time line showing the history of the different administrations within which this city has been included.

Political-administrative membership

- 1815–1866: German Confederation, Kingdom of Prussia, Pomerania
- 1866–1871: North German Confederation, Kingdom of Prussia, Pomerania
- 1871–1918: German Empire, Kingdom of Prussia, Pomerania
- 1919–1933: Weimarer Republik, Free State of Prussia, Pomerania
- 1933–1945: Nazi Germany, Pomerania
- 1945–1952: People's Republic of Poland, Szczecin Voivodeship
- 1952–1975: People's Republic of Poland, Szczecin Voivodeship
- 1975–1989: People's Republic of Poland, Szczecin Voivodeship
- 1989–1998: Poland, Szczecin Voivodeship
- 1999–Current: Poland, Western Pomerania, powiat Police County, gmina Police

Demography

- The village has a population:
- 1773 – 57
- 1939 – 112
- 1972 – 20
- 1998 – 5
- 2000 – 4
