= Żółtew =

- Village
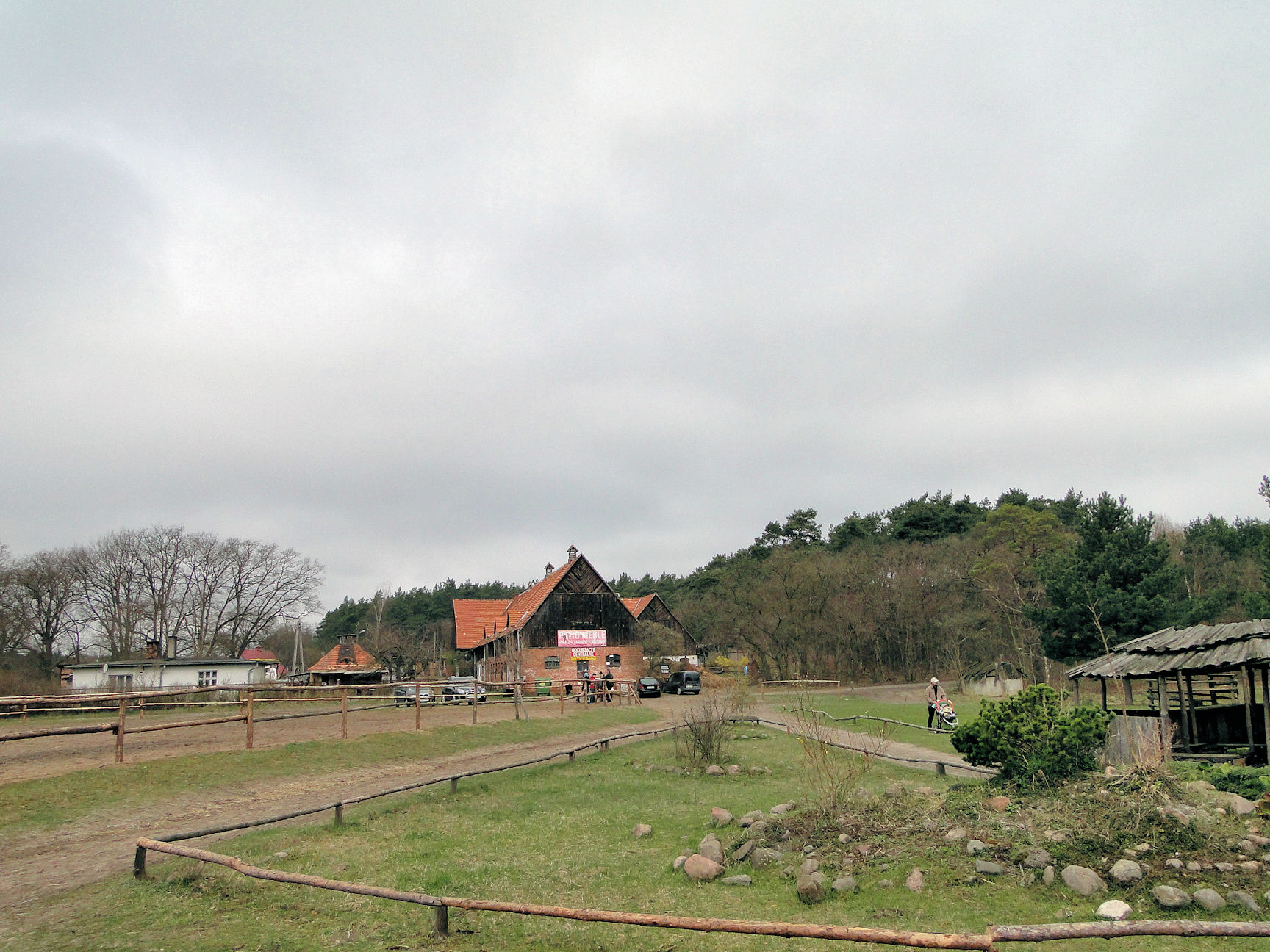

- Location within Poland
- Coordinates: 53°30′42″N 14°27′15″E
- Country: Poland
- Voivodeship: West Pomeranian
- County: Police
- Gmina: Police

Żółtew [ˈʐuu̯tɛf] (German: Hundsforth) is a village in the administrative district of Gmina Police, within Police County, West Pomeranian Voivodeship, in north-western Poland, close to the German border.
