= Stary Dębostrów =

- Settlement
- Location within Poland
- Coordinates: 53°36′22″N 14°31′14″E
- Country: Poland
- Voivodeship: West Pomeranian
- County: Police
- Gmina: Police

Stary Dębostrów [ˈstarɨ dɛmˈbɔstruf] (German: Alt Damuster) is a settlement in the administrative district of Gmina Police, within Police County, West Pomeranian Voivodeship, in north-western Poland, close to the German border.

For the history of the region, see History of Pomerania.
