= Dębostrów =

- Village
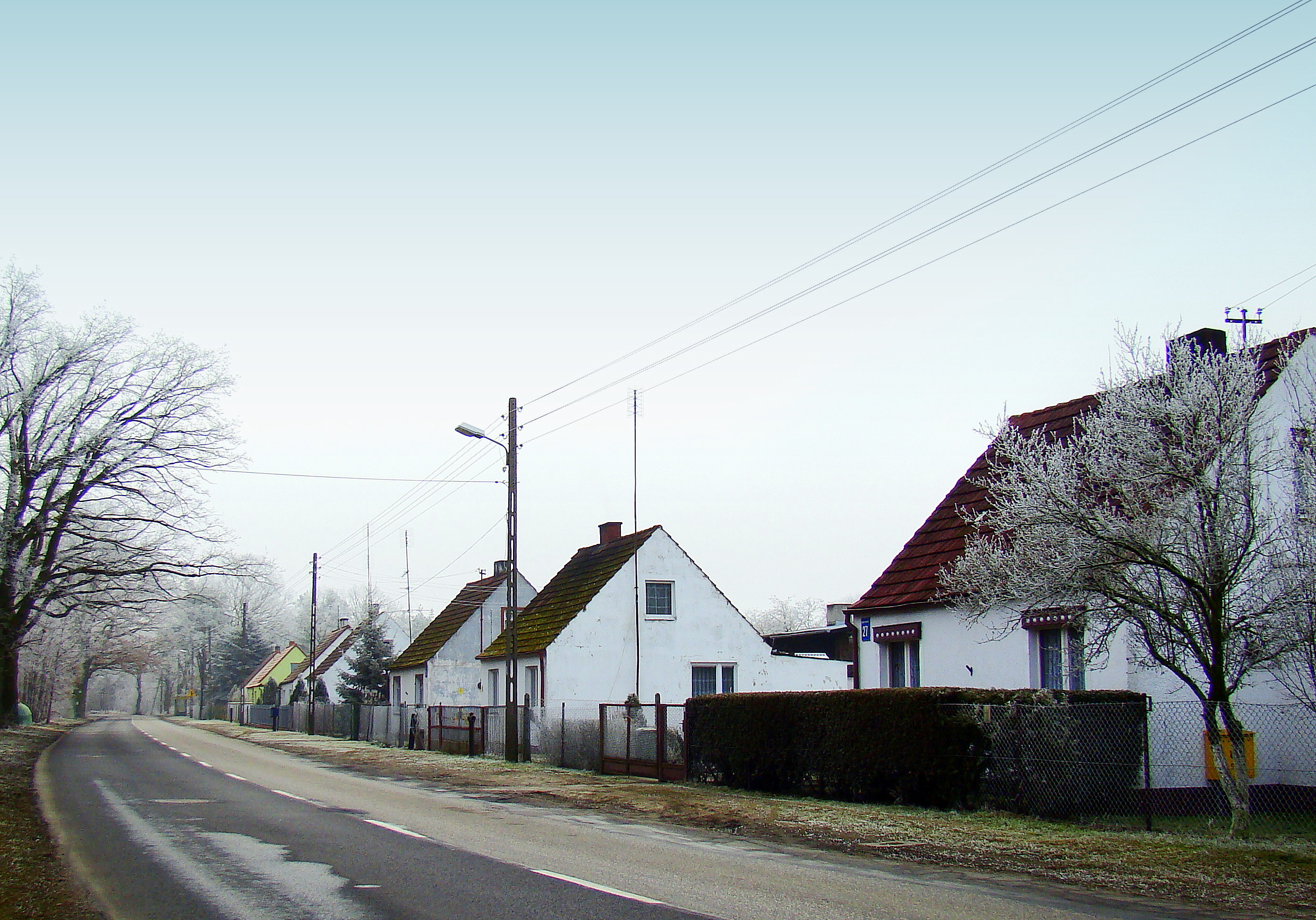
- Dębostrów

- Location within Poland
- Coordinates: 53°36′17″N 14°31′17″E
- Country: Poland
- Voivodeship: West Pomeranian
- County: Police
- Gmina: Police
- Population: 170

Dębostrów [dɛmˈbɔstruf] (formerly German: Damuster) is a village in the administrative district of Gmina Police, within Police County, West Pomeranian Voivodeship, in north-western Poland, close to the German border. It lies approximately 9 km (6 mi) north of Police and 22 km (14 mi) north of the regional capital Szczecin.

== Tourism ==
- There is a bicycle trail (red Trail "Puszcza Wkrzańska"-Szlak "Puszcza Wkrzańska") in an area of Dębostrów in Wkrzanska Forest.

== See also ==
- Police
- Szczecin
