= Sierakowo, Police County =

Sierakowo
- Village
- Location within Poland
- Coordinates: 53°30′30″N 14°29′24″E
- Country: Poland
- Voivodeship: West Pomeranian
- County: Police
- Gmina: Police

Sierakowo [ɕɛraˈkɔvɔ] (German: Charlottenhof) is a village in the administrative district of Gmina Police, within Police County, West Pomeranian Voivodeship, in north-western Poland, close to the German border. It lies approximately 6 km (4 mi) south-west of Police and 12 km (7 mi) north-west of the regional capital Szczecin.

For the history of the region, see History of Pomerania.
