= Zalesie, Police County =

Zalesie
- Village
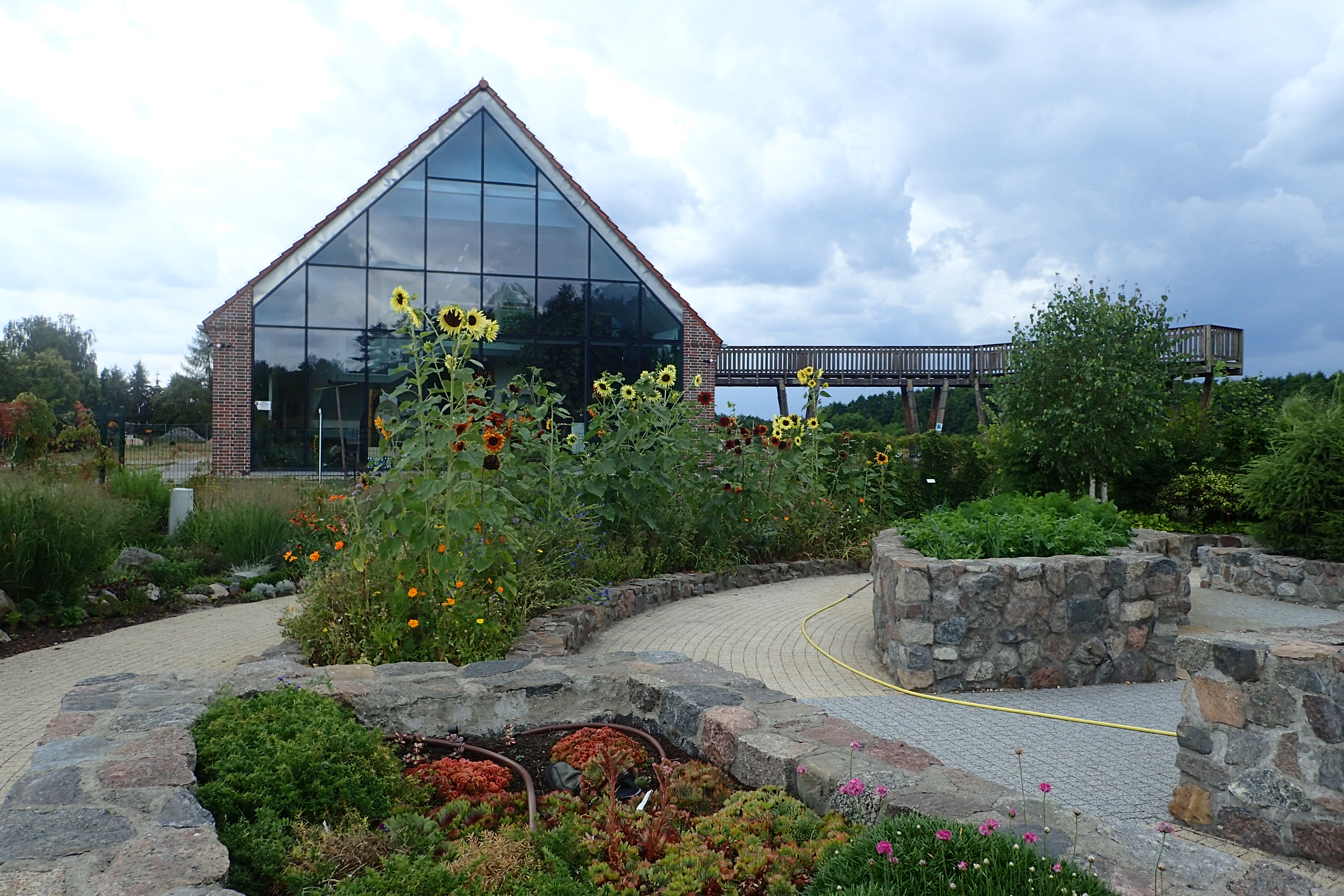
- Ecological Education Centre in Zalesie

- Location within Poland
- Coordinates: 53°34′21″N 14°22′30″E
- Country: Poland
- Voivodeship: West Pomeranian
- County: Police
- Gmina: Police

Population
  - Total: 30
- Time zone: UTC+1 (CET)
  - Summer (DST): UTC+2 (CEST)
- Vehicle registration: ZPL

Zalesie [zaˈlɛɕɛ] (German: Sonnenwald) is a village in the administrative district of Gmina Police, within Police County, West Pomeranian Voivodeship, in north-western Poland, close to the German border. It lies approximately 14 km (9 mi) west of Police and 23 km (14 mi) north-west of the regional capital Szczecin.

The village has a population of 30.
