= Stare Leśno =

- Settlement
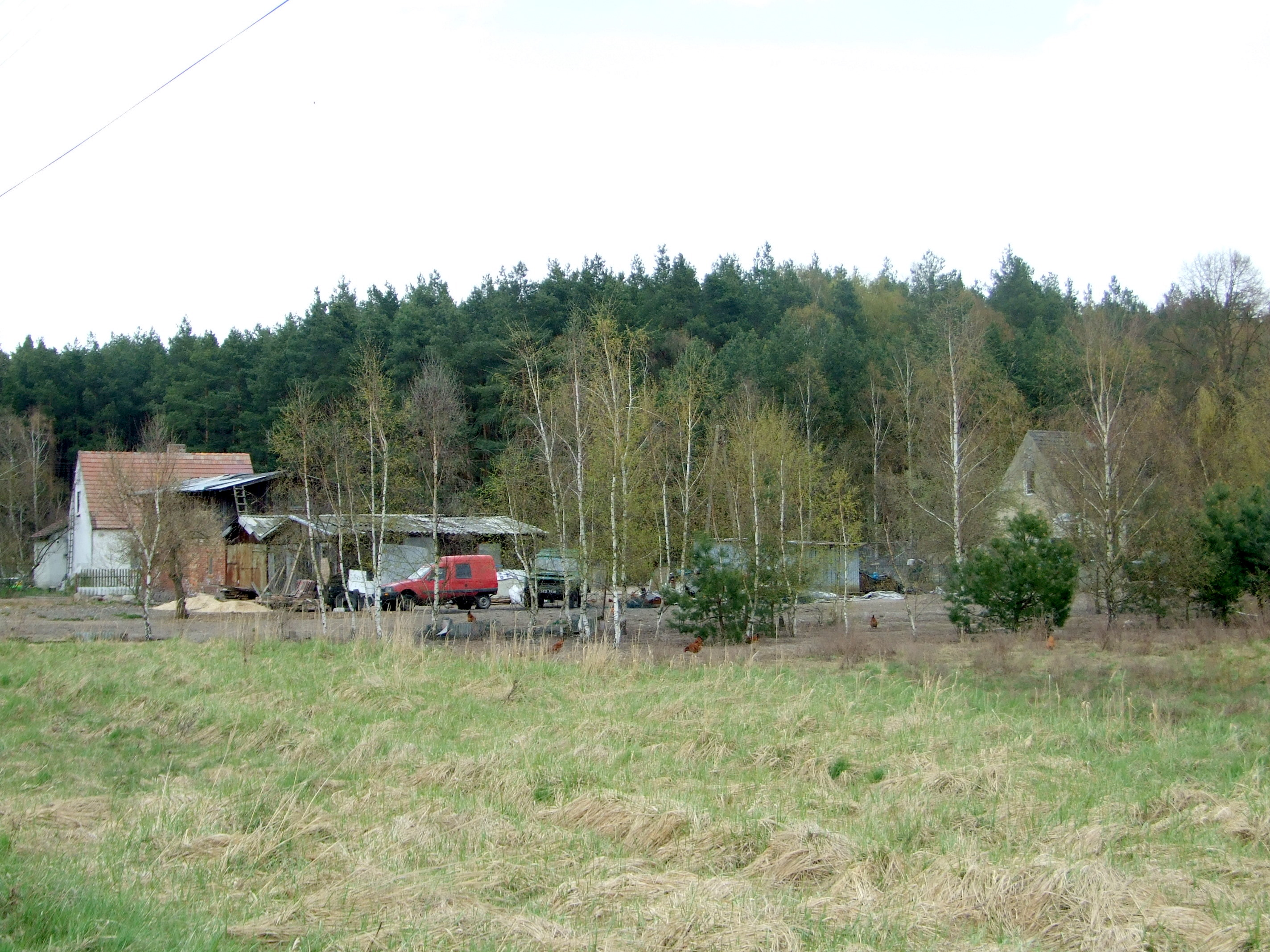

- Location within Poland
- Coordinates: 53°31′19.27″N 14°29′30.92″E
- Country: Poland
- Voivodeship: West Pomeranian
- County: Police
- Gmina: Police

Stare Leśno [ˈstarɛ ˈlɛɕnɔ] (German: Alt Leese) is a settlement in the administrative district of Gmina Police, within Police County, West Pomeranian Voivodeship, in north-western Poland, close to the German border.

For the history of the region, see History of Pomerania.
