= Witorza =

- Village
- Location within Poland
- Coordinates: 53°33′28″N 14°28′56″E
- Country: Poland
- Voivodeship: West Pomeranian
- County: Police
- Gmina: Police

Witorza [viˈtɔʐa] (German: Rönnewerder) is a village in the administrative district of Gmina Police, within Police County, West Pomeranian Voivodeship, in north-western Poland, close to the German border.
