= Pienice, West Pomeranian Voivodeship =

Pienice
- Settlement
- Location within Poland
- Coordinates: 53°39′10″N 14°29′9″E
- Country: Poland
- Voivodeship: West Pomeranian
- County: Police
- Gmina: Police
- Population: 7

Pienice ([pjɛˈnit͡sɛ]; formerly German: Herzberg, German pronunciation: [ˈhɛʁt͡sˌbɛʁk]) is a settlement in the administrative district of Gmina Police, within Police County, West Pomeranian Voivodeship, in north-western Poland, close to the German border. It lies approximately 15 km (9 mi) north of Police and 27 km (17 mi) north of the regional capital Szczecin.

For the history of the region, see History of Pomerania.

The settlement has a population of 7.
