= Poddymin =

- Village
- Location within Poland
- Coordinates: 53°35′N 14°20′E
- Country: Poland
- Voivodeship: West Pomeranian
- County: Police
- Gmina: Police

Poddymin [pɔdˈdɨmin] (German: Eichfeuer) is a village in the administrative district of Gmina Police, within Police County, West Pomeranian Voivodeship, in north-western Poland, close to the German border. It lies approximately 17 km (11 mi) west of Police and 25 km (16 mi) north-west of the regional capital Szczecin.

For the history of the region, see History of Pomerania.
