= Trzeszczyn =

- Village
- Location within Poland
- Coordinates: 53°33′N 14°31′E
- Country: Poland
- Voivodeship: West Pomeranian
- County: Police
- Gmina: Police
- Population: 260

Trzeszczyn [ˈtʂɛʂt͡ʂɨn] (German Trestin) is a village in the administrative district of Gmina Police, within Police County, West Pomeranian Voivodeship, in north-western Poland, close to the German border. It lies approximately 4 km (2 mi) north-west of Police and 16 km (10 mi) north of the regional capital Szczecin.

In the area of the village there is a memorial to the victims of Nazi camps in a town named Police.

In the Middle Ages the area of Trzeszczyn was a part of Duchy of Pomerania. In the 13th century, the village of Trzeszczyn was a feudal estate belonging to the knight Gobello, who was marshal at the court of Barnim I, Duke of Pomerania.

After receiving the land from the Germans that happened after the Second World War, in the year 1946 Trzeszczyn was incorporated into the Enclave of Police. Nowadays it is a part of Polish Police County. For the history of the region, see History of Pomerania.

The village has a population of 260.
