= Siedlice, Police County =

Siedlice
- Village
- Location within Poland
- Coordinates: 53°32′34″N 14°31′49″E
- Country: Poland
- Voivodeship: West Pomeranian
- County: Police
- Gmina: Police

Siedlice [ɕɛˈdlit͡sɛ] (German: Zedlitzfelde) is a village in the administrative district of Gmina Police, within Police County, West Pomeranian Voivodeship, in north-western Poland, close to the German border. It lies approximately 3 km (2 mi) north-west of Police and 15 km (9 mi) north of the regional capital Szczecin.

For the history of the region, see History of Pomerania.
