= Węgornik =

- Village
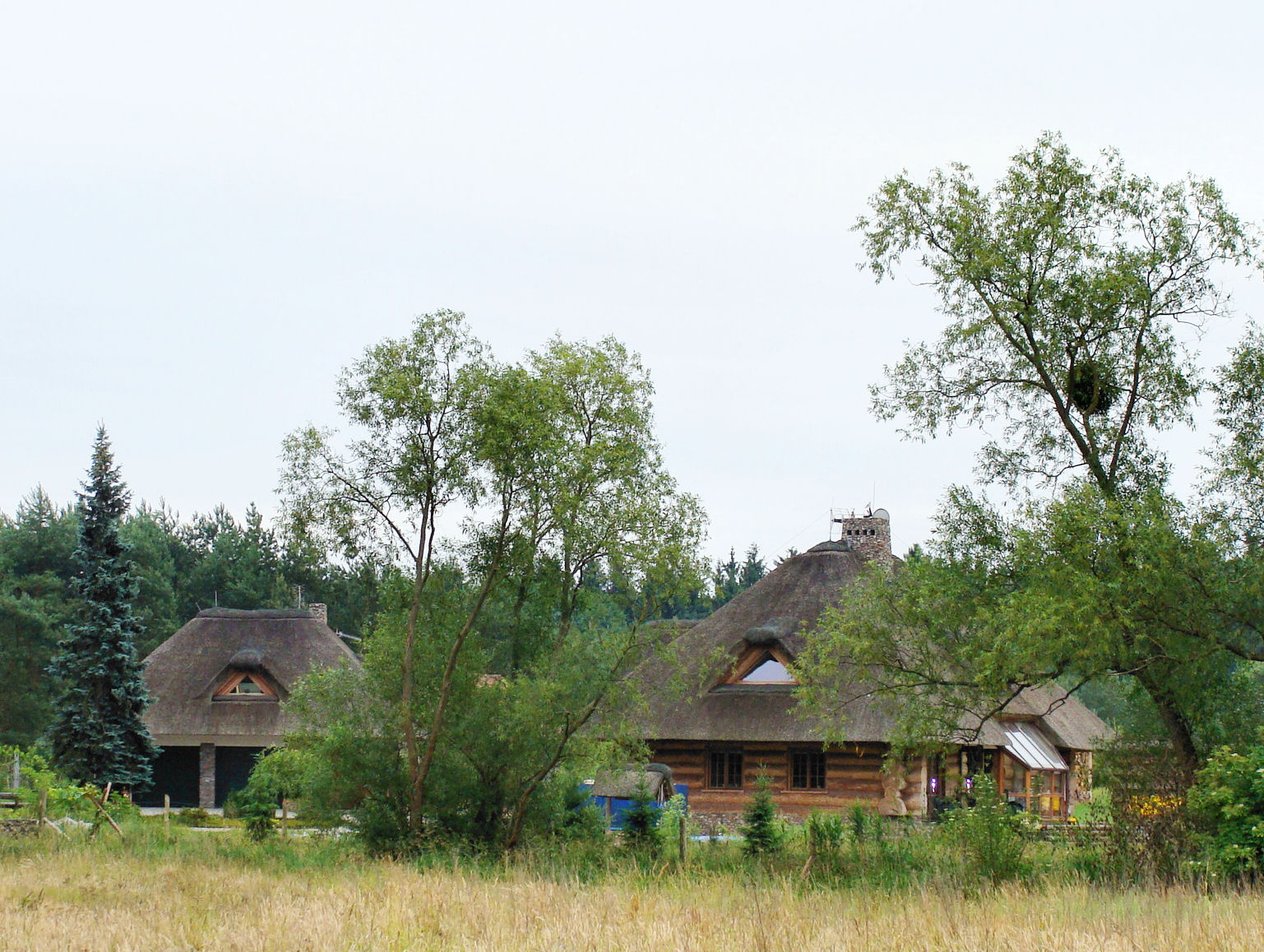
- Modern thatched house

- Location within Poland
- Coordinates: 53°33′N 14°24′E
- Country: Poland
- Voivodeship: West Pomeranian
- County: Police
- Gmina: Police

Węgornik [vɛnˈɡɔrnik] (German: Aalgraben) is a village in the administrative district of Gmina Police, within Police County, West Pomeranian Voivodeship, in north-western Poland, close to the German border. It lies approximately 12 km (7 mi) west of Police and 20 km (12 mi) north-west of the regional capital Szczecin.
