= Wieńkowo =

- Village
- Location within Poland
- Coordinates: 53°35′10″N 14°31′22″E
- Country: Poland
- Voivodeship: West Pomeranian
- County: Police
- Gmina: Police

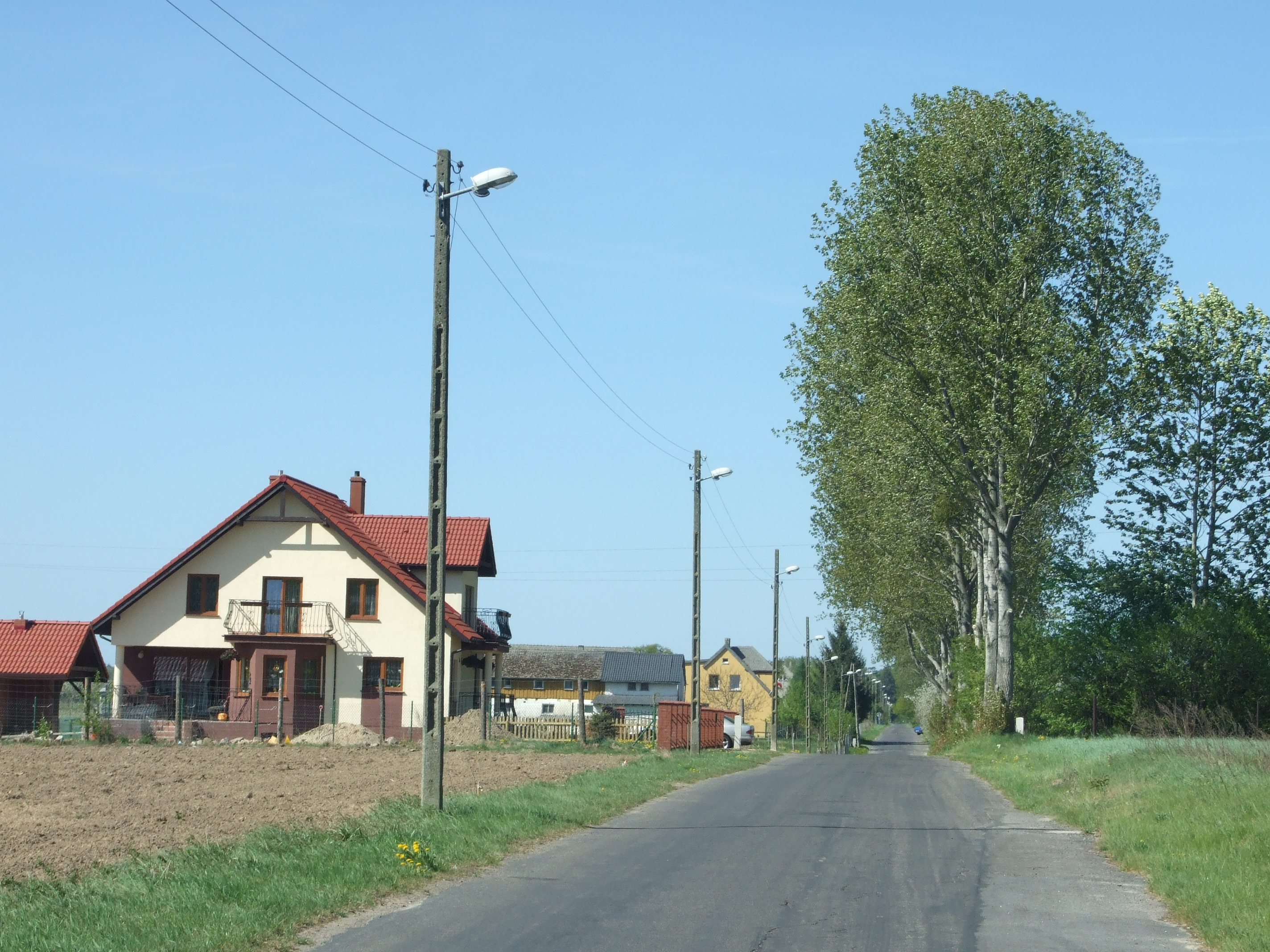
Main street in 2011

Wieńkowo [vjɛɲˈkɔvɔ] (German: Wenkendorf) is a village in the administrative district of Gmina Police, within Police County, West Pomeranian Voivodeship, in north-western Poland, close to the German border. It lies approximately 7 km (4 mi) north-west of Police and 20 km (12 mi) north of the regional capital Szczecin.
