= Leśno Górne =

- Village
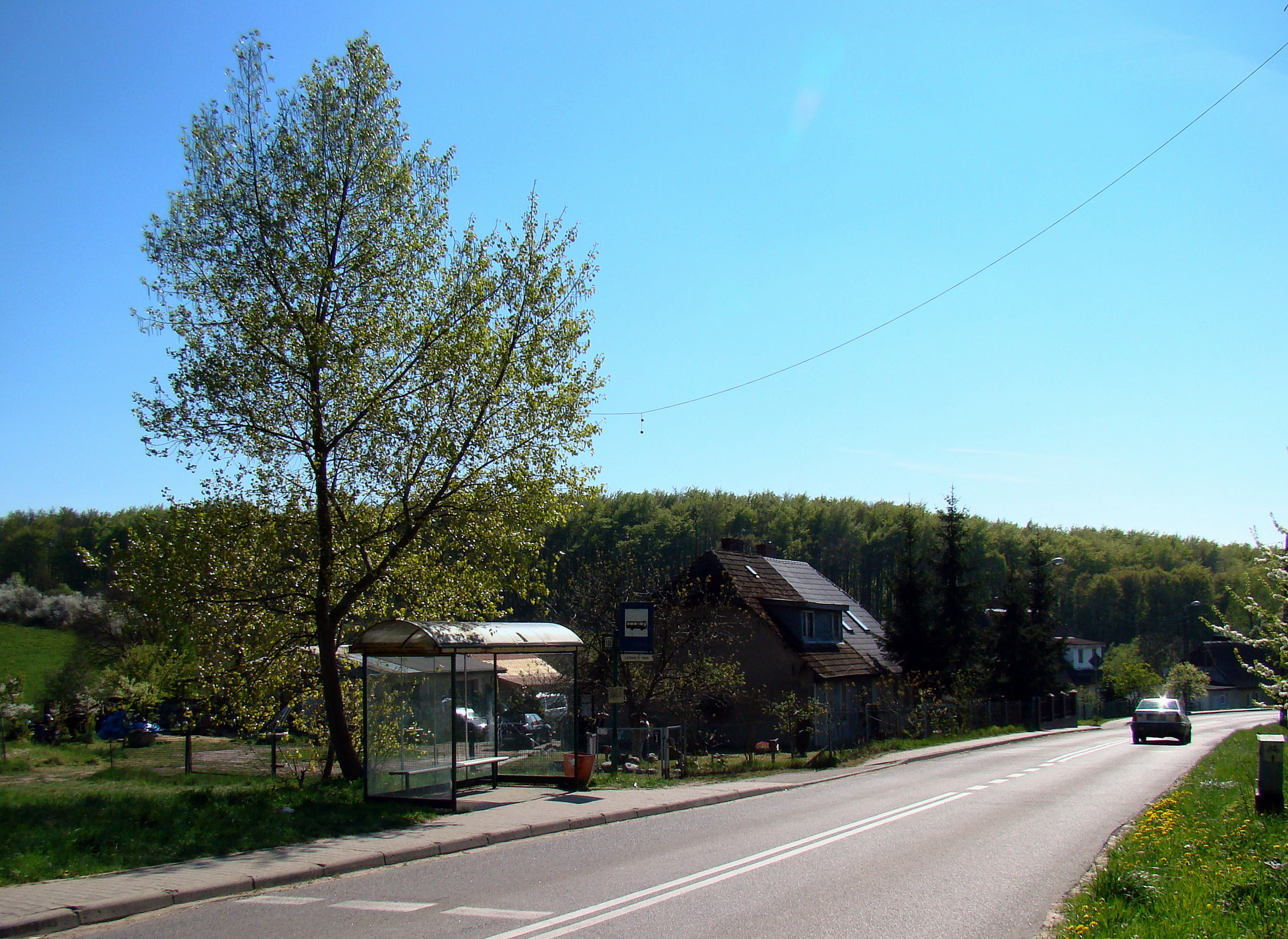

- Location within Poland
- Coordinates: 53°30′34″N 14°30′55″E
- Country: Poland
- Voivodeship: West Pomeranian
- County: Police
- Gmina: Police

Leśno Górne [ˈlɛɕnɔ ˈɡurnɛ] (German: Hohenleese) is a village in the administrative district of Gmina Police, within Police County, West Pomeranian Voivodeship, in north-western Poland, close to the German border. It lies approximately 5 km (3 mi) south-west of Police and 12 km (7 mi) north-west of the regional capital Szczecin.

== History ==
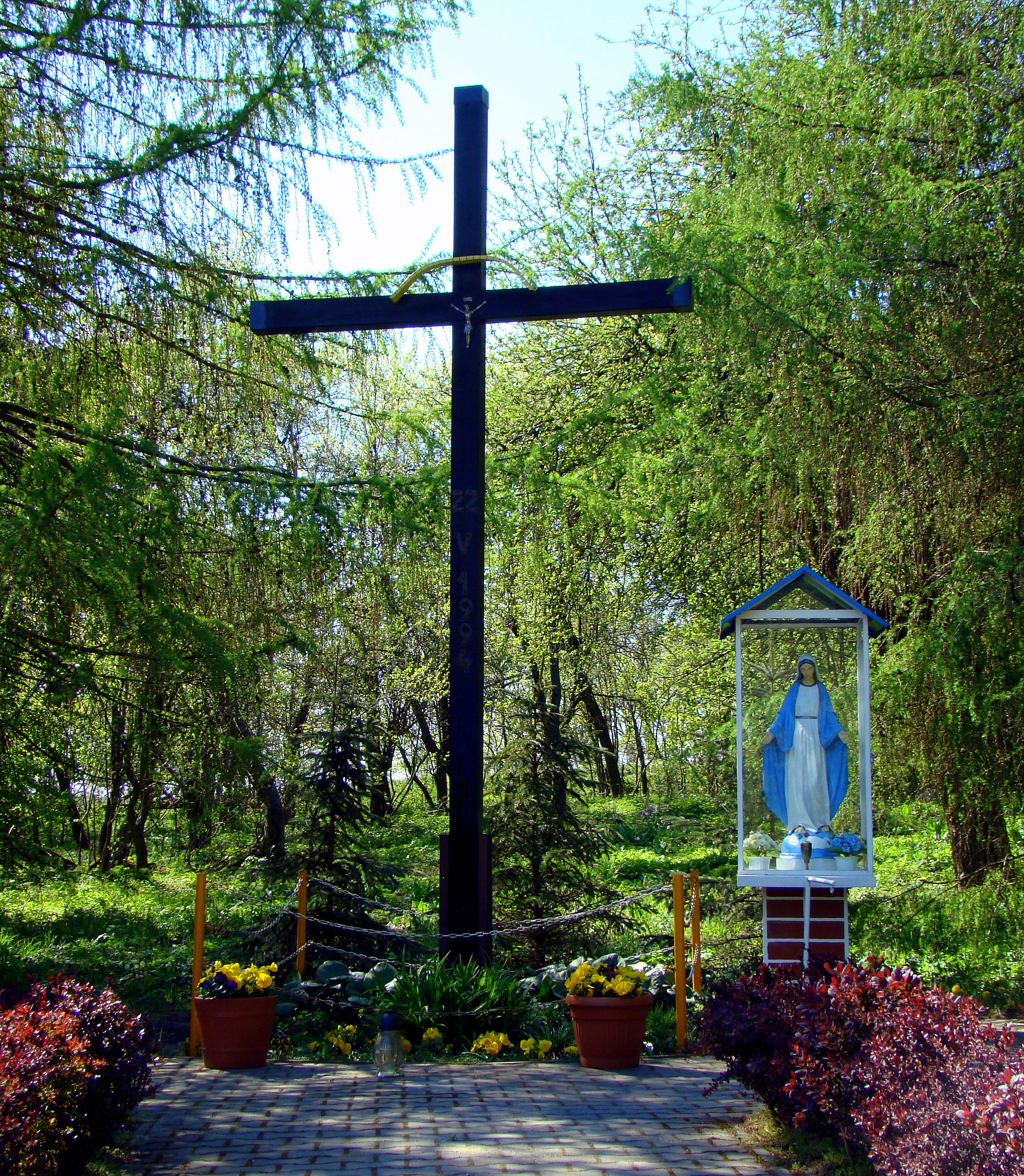
Leśno Górne, Christian cross

For the history of the region, see History of Pomerania.
