= Gmina Police =

Gmina Police Police Commune
- Gmina
- Flag Coat of arms
- Interactive map of Gmina Police
- Coordinates (Police): 53°32′N 14°34′E
- Country: Poland
- Voivodeship: West Pomeranian
- County: Police
- Seat: Police

Area
  - Total: 251.42 km^{2} (97.07 sq mi)

Population (2006)
  - Total: 41,417
  - Density: 164.73/km^{2} (426.65/sq mi)
  - Urban: 34,284
  - Rural: 7,133
- Website: http://www.police.pl/

Gmina Police is an urban-rural gmina (administrative district) in Police County, West Pomeranian Voivodeship, in north-western Poland, on the German border. Its seat is the town of Police, which lies approximately 13 kilometres (8 mi) north of the regional capital Szczecin.

The gmina covers an area of 251.42 square kilometres (97.1 sq mi), and as of 2006 its total population is 41,417 (out of which the population of Police amounts to 34,284, and the population of the rural part of the gmina is 7,133).

== Villages ==
Apart from the town of Police, Gmina Police contains the villages and settlements of Bartoszewo, Dębostrów, Dobieszczyn, Drogoradz, Gunice, Karpin, Leśno Górne, Mazańczyce, Niekłończyca, Nowa Jasienica, Pienice, Pilchowo, Podbrzezie, Poddymin, Przęsocin, Siedlice, Sierakowo, Stare Leśno, Stary Dębostrów, Tanowo, Tatynia, Trzebież, Trzeszczyn, Turznica, Uniemyśl, Węgornik, Wieńkowo, Witorza, Zalesie and Żółtew.

== Neighbouring gminas ==
Gmina Police is bordered by the city of Szczecin and by the gminas of Dobra, Goleniów, Nowe Warpno and Stepnica. It also borders Germany.
