= Trzebież =

- Village
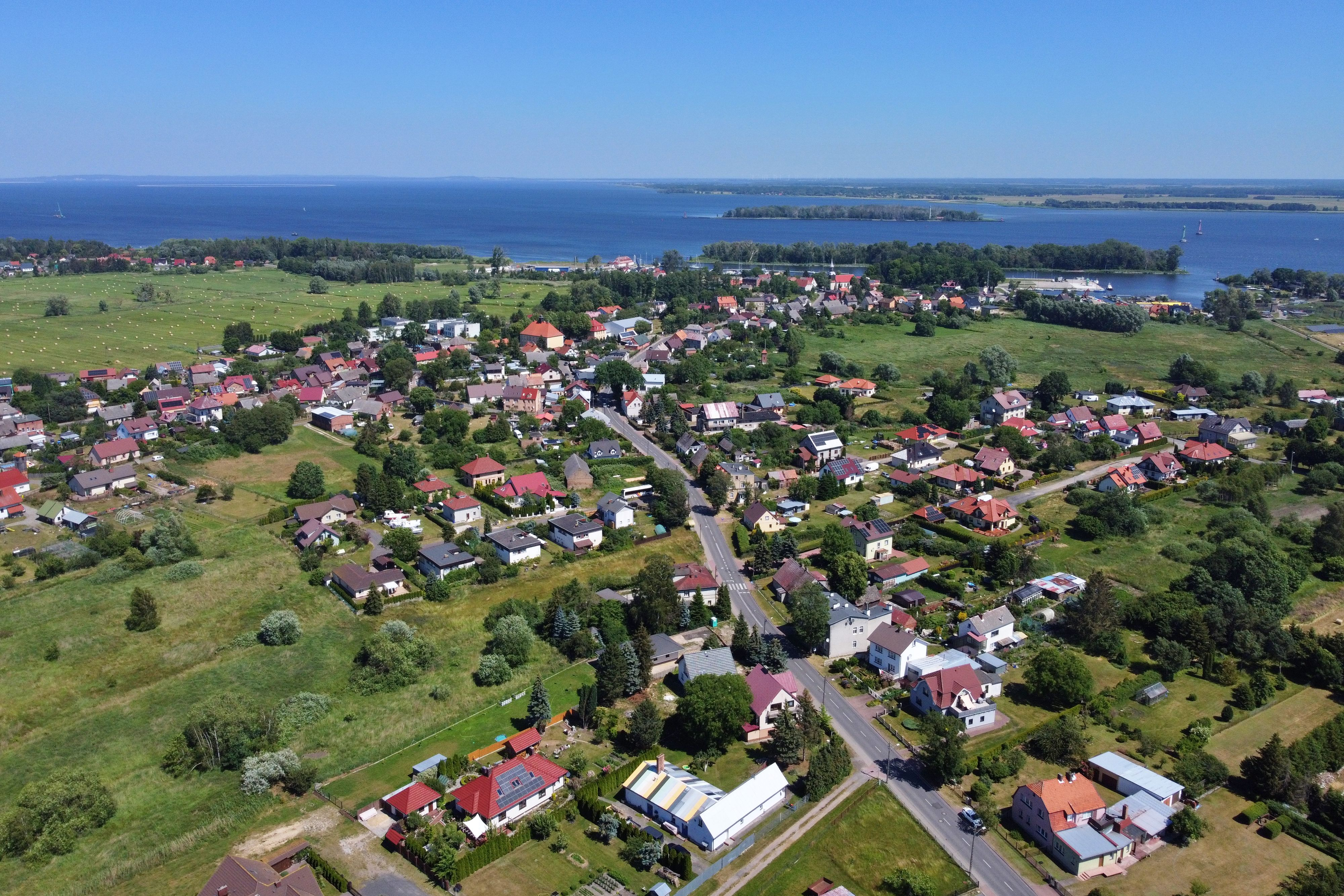
- Aerial view of Trzebież

- Location within Poland
- Coordinates: 53°39′23″N 14°30′30″E
- Country: Poland
- Voivodeship: West Pomeranian
- County: Police
- Gmina: Police
- First mentioned: c. 1180
- Population: 2,500
- Time zone: UTC+1 (CET)
  - Summer (DST): UTC+2 (CEST)
- Postal code: 72-020
- Area code: +48 091
- Vehicle registration: ZPL
- Website: http://www.trzebiez.pl/

Trzebież [ˈtʂɛbjɛʂ] (German: Ziegenort) is a village in the administrative district of Gmina Police, within Police County, West Pomeranian Voivodeship, in north-western Poland, close to the German border. It lies approximately 15 km (9 mi) north of Police and 28 km (17 mi) north of the regional capital Szczecin.

The village lies on the Szczecin Lagoon, and has a harbour, a marina, a beach and a school of sailing.

== History ==
In the early 12th century, the territory formed part of Duchy of Poland, and following the country's fragmentation into smaller duchies, it formed part of the Duchy of Pomerania, and smaller splinter duchies. The settlement's name is mentioned as Zegenhort in 1280, when Duke Bogusław IV gave the village to a burgher from Szczecin. The settlement suffered heavy losses during the Thirty Years' War and the Seven Years' War. In the following centuries, Ziegenort developed as a typical settlement on the Szczecin Lagoon. In the 18th century, the village gained its own self-government. From 1815, it formed part of the Province of Pomerania of the Kingdom of Prussia, and from 1871 also of the German Empire. At the end of the 19th century, passenger and transit ports, as well as a shipyard, were built here. After 1898, Ziegenort gained a railway connection with Police, and in 1910 a regular passenger connection was launched. By 1930, the waters of the lagoon revealed a beach of clean sand. This initiated the development of tourism.

During World War II, the settlement suffered approximately 40% of its buildings (mainly the port and the sawmill). There was also a temporary camp for Polish forced laborers here. Ziegenort was occupied on April 27, 1945, by Soviet (2nd Belorussian Front – 2nd Shock Army) and Polish troops. The territory became again part of Poland after the end of World War II, despite being located on the left band of the Oder. The village officially changed its name to the Polish Trzebież. However, it was initially administered by the Soviets as part of the so-called Enclave of Police. It was placed under Polish administration in September 1946 after the liquidation of the so-called enclave.

For several post-war months, the village was called Zatoka by the first Polish settlers. In 1946, the Zaodrzańskie Forest Management Board was established here, later transformed into the Trzebież Forest District. By 1948, the port, shipyards and sawmill were reopened, and the "Certa" fishing cooperative was established. The settlement began to develop dynamically. Trzebież's greatest prosperity took place in the 1970s[2], it was then the largest Polish port on the Szczecin Lagoon. Administratively, it was located until 1975 in the "large" and then until 1998 in the "small" Szczecin Voivodeship.

On 24 November 2018, as a result of arson, a several hundred-meter-long wooden walking promenade by the Szczecin Lagoon burned down.

Below is a timeline showing the history of the different administrations in which this city has been.

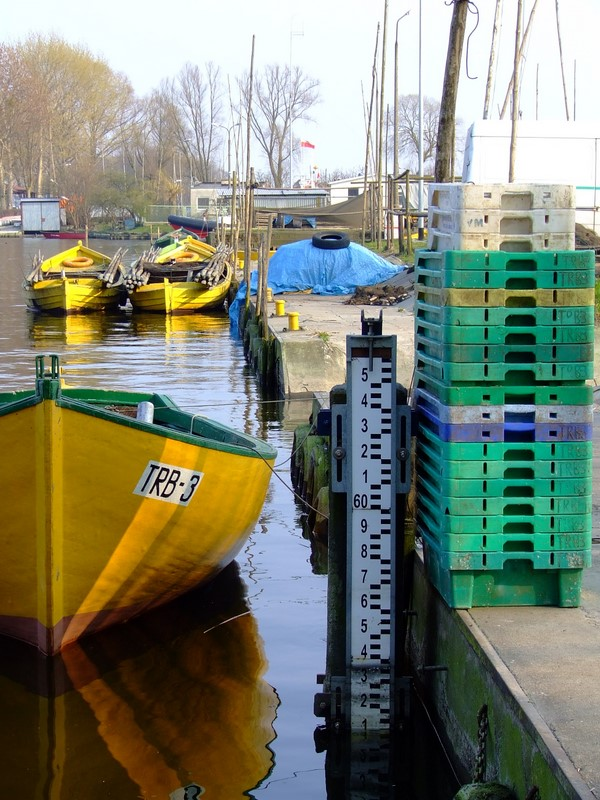
Trzebież, Fish Harbor

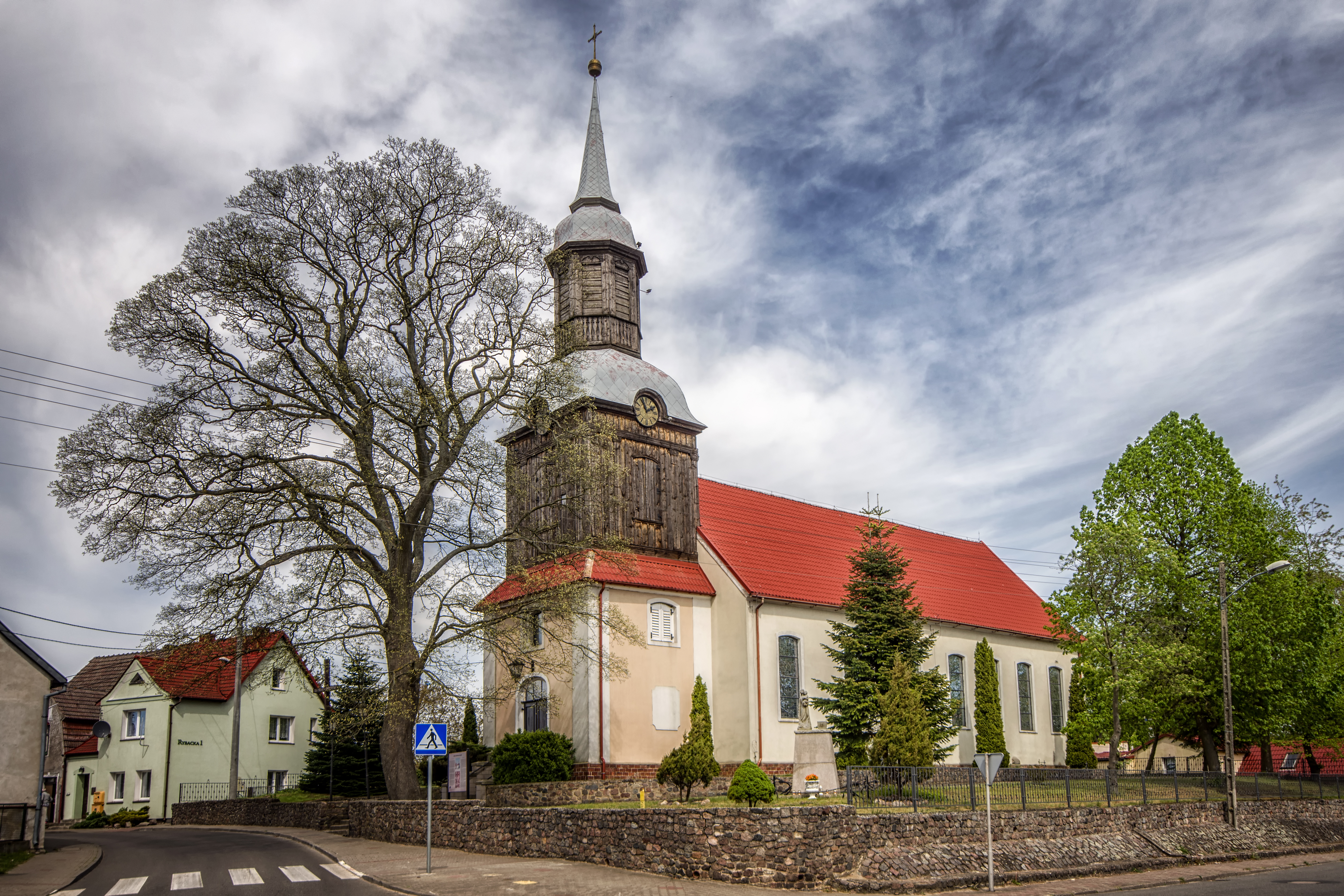
Exaltation of the Holy Cross church from 1745

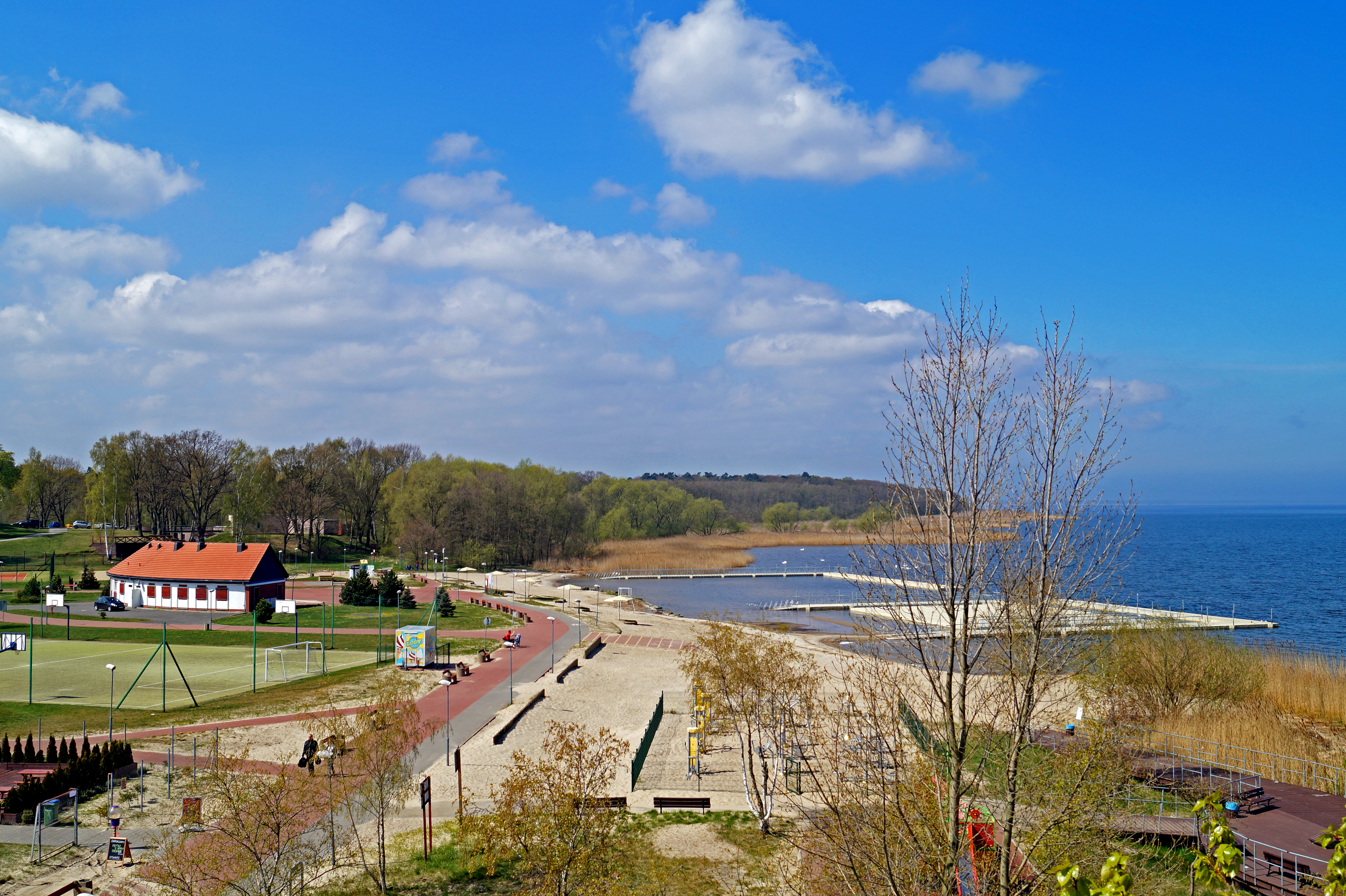
Beach and promenade in Trzebież

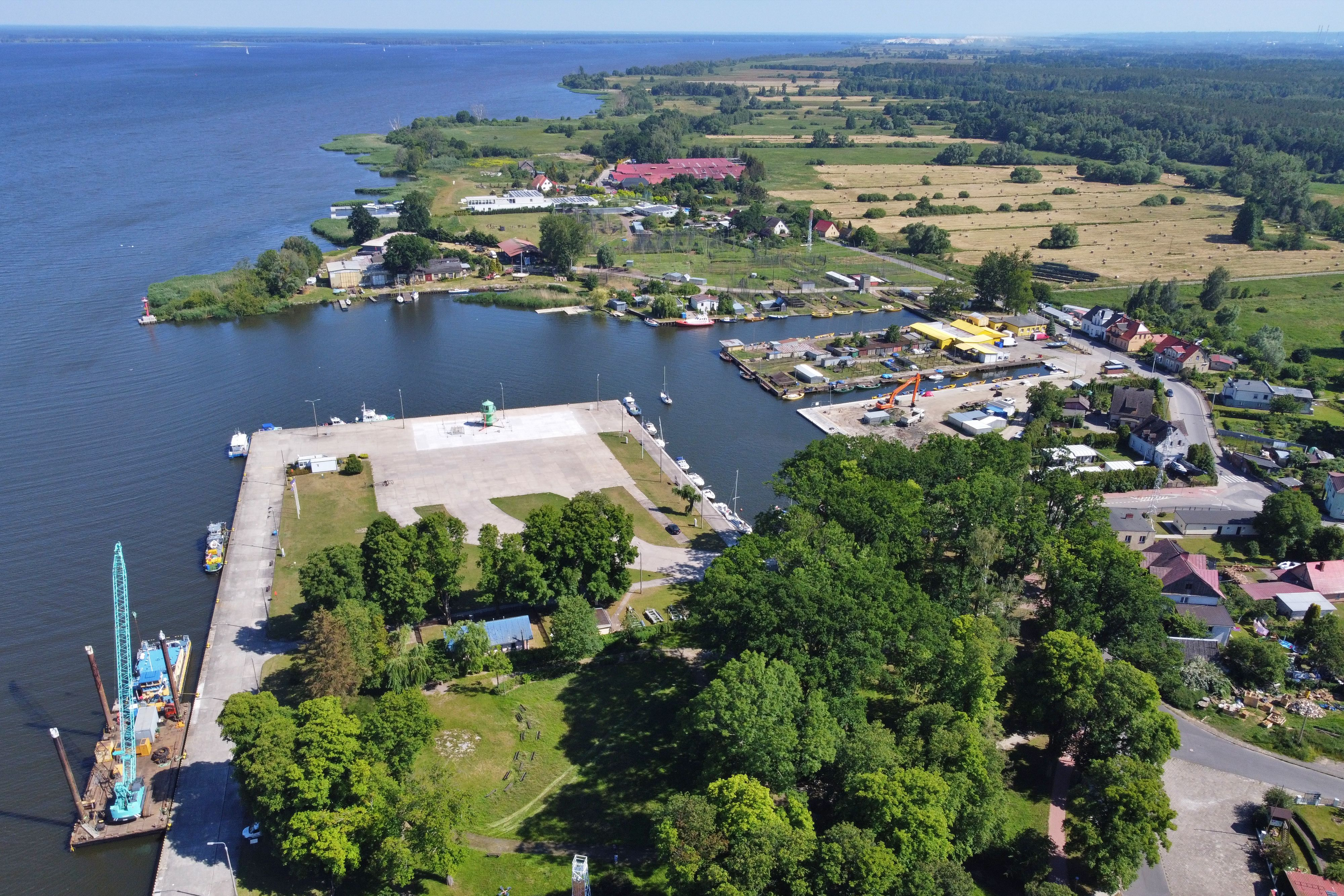
Port of Trzebież

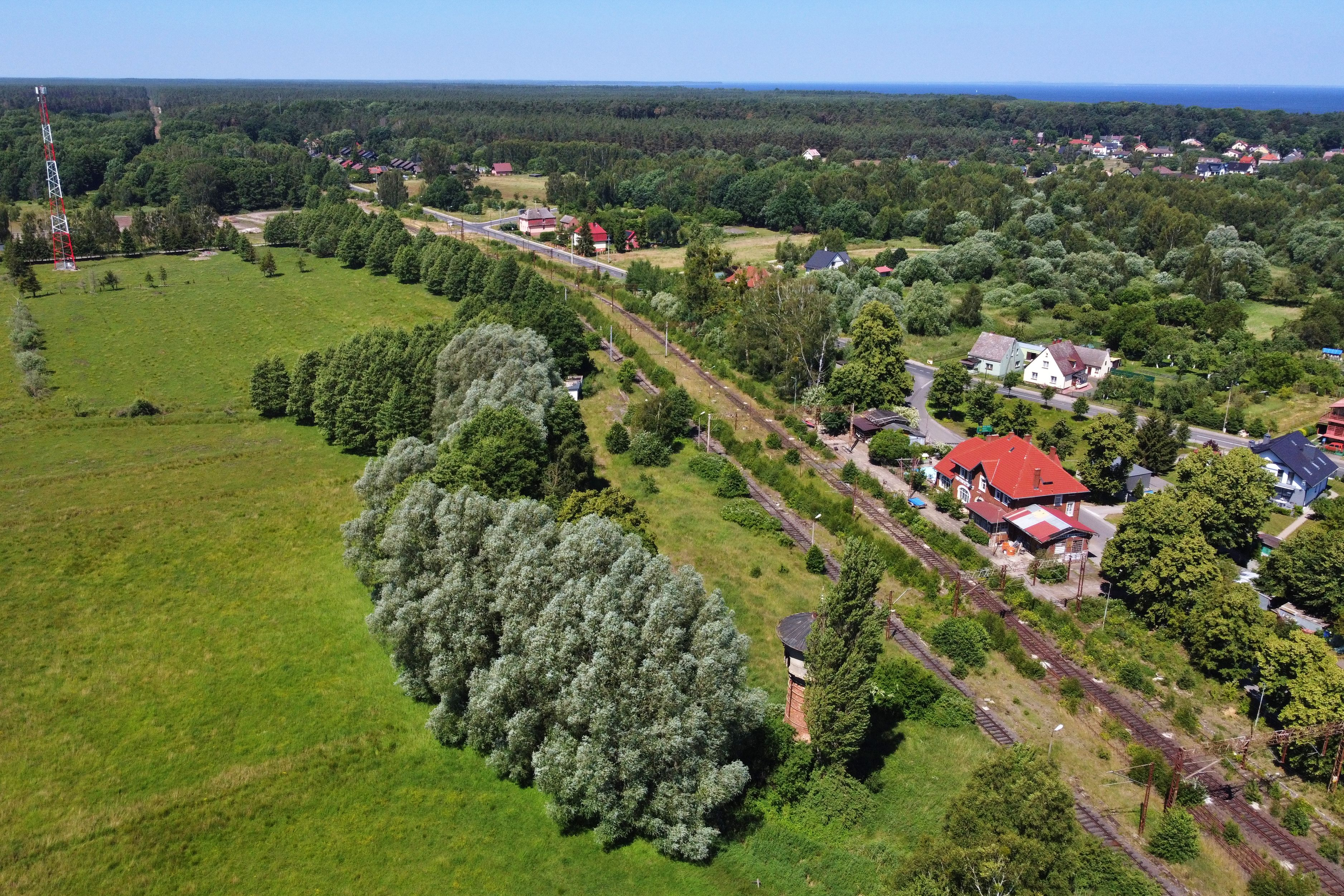
Railway station

== Tourism ==
- PTTK path (green footpath Trail Puszczy Wkrzańskiej-Szlak Puszczy Wkrzańskiej) in an area of Trzebież in Wkrzanska Forest
- Bicycle trail (red Trail "Puszcza Wkrzańska"-Szlak "Puszcza Wkrzańska") in an area of Trzebież in Wkrzanska Forest
