= Coat of arms of Police =

- Adopted: 1994 (current design)
- Shield: White (silver) Iberian style escutcheon
- Compartment: Red griffin head with yellow (golden) beak and crown
- Use: Police, Gmina Police

The coat of arms of the town of Police in West Pomeranian Voivodeship, Poland depicts the head of a red griffin with a yellow (golden) beak, and a yellow (golden) crown, place on the white (silver) background.

== Design ==
The coat of arms is a white (silver) Iberian style escutcheon with square top and rounded base. It depicts a head of a griffin with red feathers, a symbol of house of Griffin, a dynasty that ruled in Pomerania during the Medieval Ages. The animal wears yellow (golden) crown, and has yellow (golden) beak, with a red tongue put out of its mouth.

== History ==
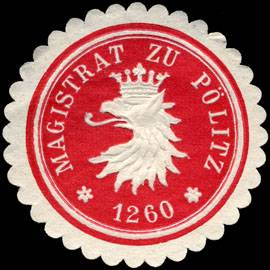
The seal of the town council of Police, depicting the griffin from the coat of arms, used between 1850 and 1945.

The griffin is a traditional symbol of the West Pomerania, used since 12th century. Between 12th and 13th century, the griffin become the symbol of the House of Griffin, that ruled in that area. Subsequently, the red griffin on the white background had become the symbol of the Duchy of the Pomerania-Stettin. In the 1730s, that design had become the symbol of the entire West Pomerania.

In 1321, the town of Police, was incorporated into the city of Szczecin. As such, it had adopted the coat of arms of the city, which was the head of a red griffin with a yellow (golden) beak, with its red tongue out of its mouth, placed on the blue background. Originally, the coat of arms depicted the animal without a crown, however later, a yellow (golden) crown on its head had been added. Police became an independent town again in 1808.

In 1994, the town had established the new, current design of its coat of arms, different from the one used by the city of Szczecin. In that year, it had also established a flag, that features the coat of arms as part of its design.

Since 1999, the coat of arms is also used by the municipality of Police.

== Flag of Police ==
The flag of Police.

The flag of the town of Police was established, together with the coat of arms, in 1994. Since 1999, it is also used by the municipality of Police. It is divided into three stripes, from top to bottom, red, yellow (golden), and white (silver). The top and bottom stripes have the aspect ratio of height to width of 2:5, and are twice as high as the middle stripe, that has the aspect ratio of height to width of 1:5. In the middle of the top stripe is placed the coat of arms of the town.
