= Tanowo =

- Village
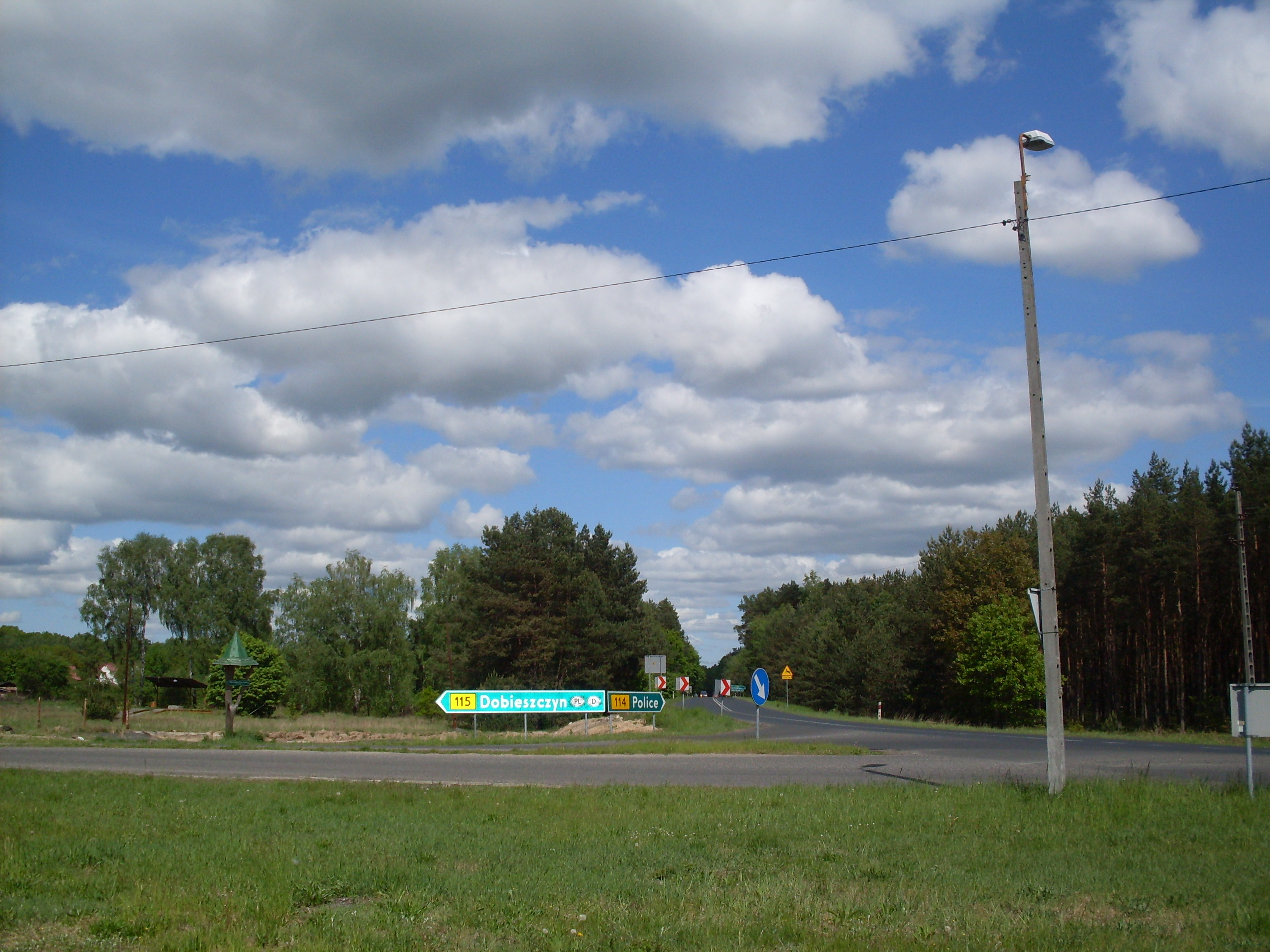
- Roads in Tanowo

- Location within Poland
- Coordinates: 53°33′N 14°28′E
- Country: Poland
- Voivodeship: West Pomeranian
- County: Police
- Gmina: Police
- Population: 840

Tanowo [taˈnɔvɔ] (German: Falkenwalde) is a village in the administrative district of Gmina Police, within Police County, West Pomeranian Voivodeship, in north-western Poland, close to the German border. It lies approximately 7 km (4 mi) west of Police and 17 km (11 mi) north-west of the regional capital Szczecin.

In the 13th century, the village of Falkenwalde was a feudal estate belonging to the knight Gobello, who was marshal at the court of Barnim I, Duke of Pomerania. For the history of the region, see History of Pomerania.

The village has a population of 840.
