= Ueckermünde Heath =

German forest

Coordinates: 53°37′15″N 14°23′03″E

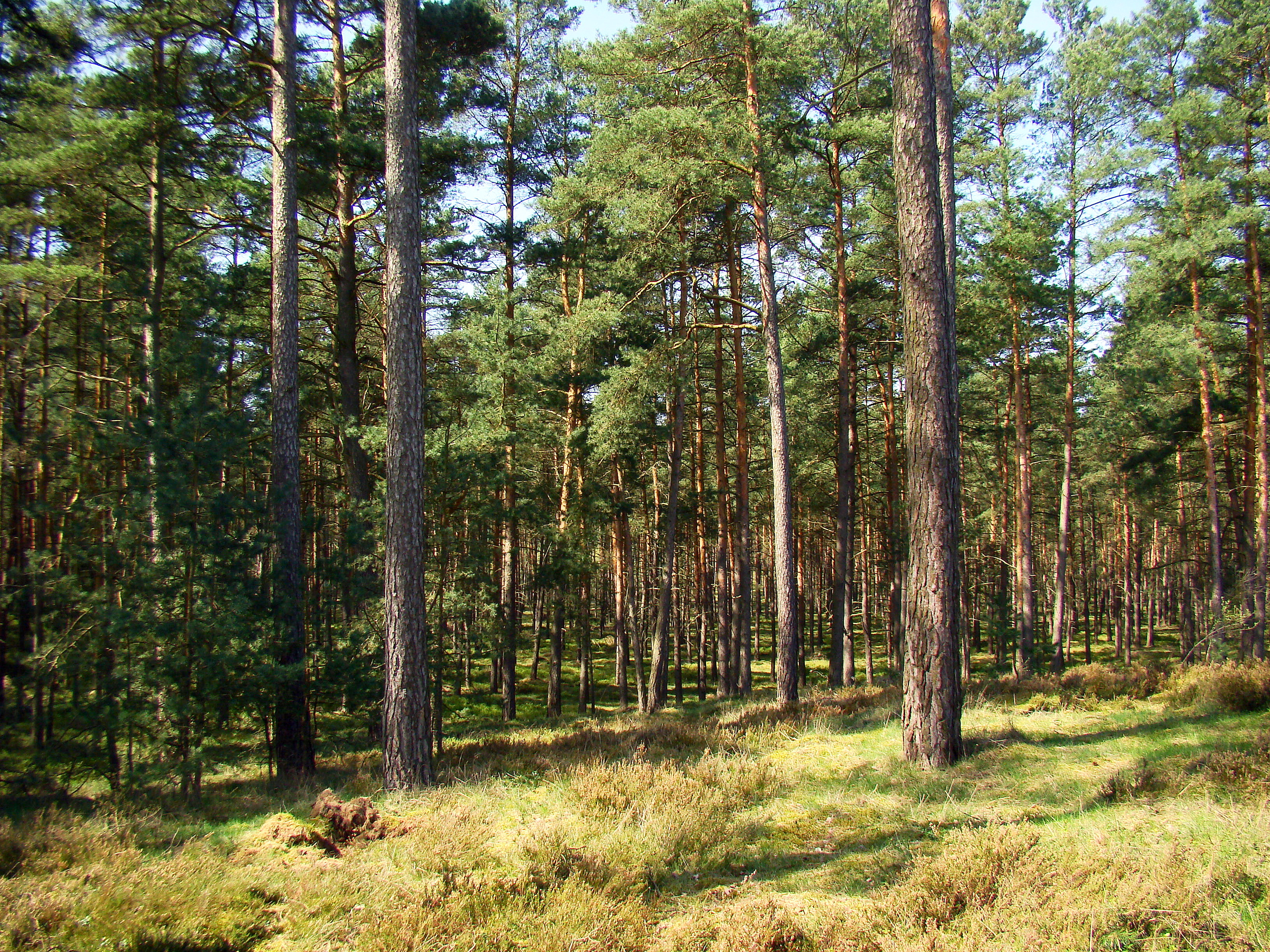
Ueckermünde Heath

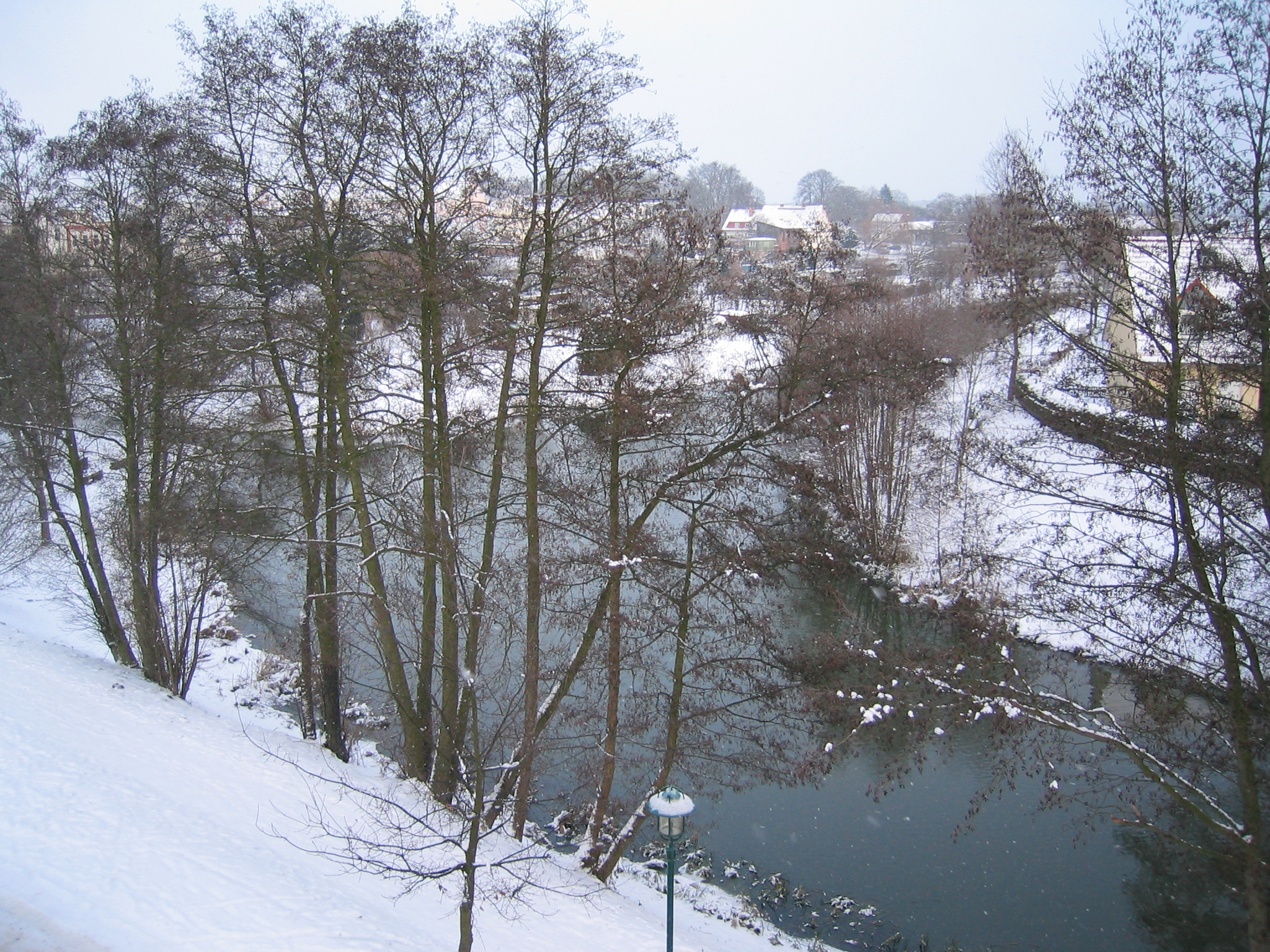
The Ucker/Uecker in Torgelow

Ueckermünde Heath (German: Ueckermünder Heide, Polish: Puszcza Wkrzańska) is a large area of forest, bogland and heathland, 1,000 km^{2} in area, in northeastern Germany and northwestern Poland, on the Oder river and the Szczecin Lagoon. In 1945, the eastern part went to Poland and is now called the Puszcza Wkrzańska. Świdwie Lake near Tanowo is the site of a nature reserve and Ramsar site.

== Geography ==
The region is about 1000 km^{2} large. In the north it borders to the Szczecin Lagoon and in the east on the Oder. In the west the lowland of the Friedländer Großen Wiese forms the border and in the south the line Stettin-Pasewalk forms it. The Ueckermünde Heath is a lowland area, where only a few points reach heights above the 20 metre above sea level (except for: Dachsberge south of Hintersee with 48 metres). The forest area is crossed by the rivers Uecker, Randow and Zarow. There are also numerous protected bogs, especially in the border area with Poland. The bogs were also the reason why the heath was colonised relatively late. In the 17th century it was mainly colonists who set up charcoal burners and glassworks. The frequent occurrence of bog iron was the basis for the metal processing plants, primarily in Torgelow. In the middle of the area there is a military training area of about 50 km^{2}, which is used by the Bundeswehr (barracks in Torgelow and Eggesin). Today, the Ueckermünde Heath is important for forestry, but also increasingly for tourism. In addition, there is a diverse flora and fauna. Since 2015 there has also been a pack of wolves and their offspring living in the Ueckermünde Heath. Cranes, screaming eagles and white-tailed eagles breed in the forests and moors.

- Places in Germany:
  - Ahlbeck
  - Eggesin
  - Jatznick
  - Torgelow
  - Ueckermünde
  - Viereck
- Places in Poland:
  - Police
  - Nowe Warpno
  - Szczecin
  - Trzebież
