= Police County =

Police County Powiat policki
- County
- Flag Coat of arms

- Location within the voivodeship

- Division into gminas
- Coordinates (Police): 53°32′N 14°34′E
- Country: Poland
- Voivodeship: West Pomeranian
- Seat: Police
- Gminas: Total 4: Gmina Dobra; Gmina Kołbaskowo; Gmina Nowe Warpno; Gmina Police

Area
  - Total: 664.16 km^{2} (256.43 sq mi)

Population (2006)
  - Total: 64,147
  - Density: 96.584/km^{2} (250.15/sq mi)
  - Urban: 35,454
  - Rural: 28,693
- Car plates: ZPL
- Website: www.powiat.policki.pl

Police County (Polish: powiat policki, pronounced [ˈpɔvjat pɔˈlit͡skʲi]) is a unit of territorial administration and local government (powiat) in West Pomeranian Voivodeship, north-western Poland, on the Polish-German border. It came into being on January 1, 1999, as a result of the Polish local government reforms passed in 1998. Its administrative seat and largest town is Police, which lies 13 kilometres (8 mi) north of the regional capital Szczecin. The only other town in the county is Nowe Warpno, lying 29 km (18 mi) north-west of Police.

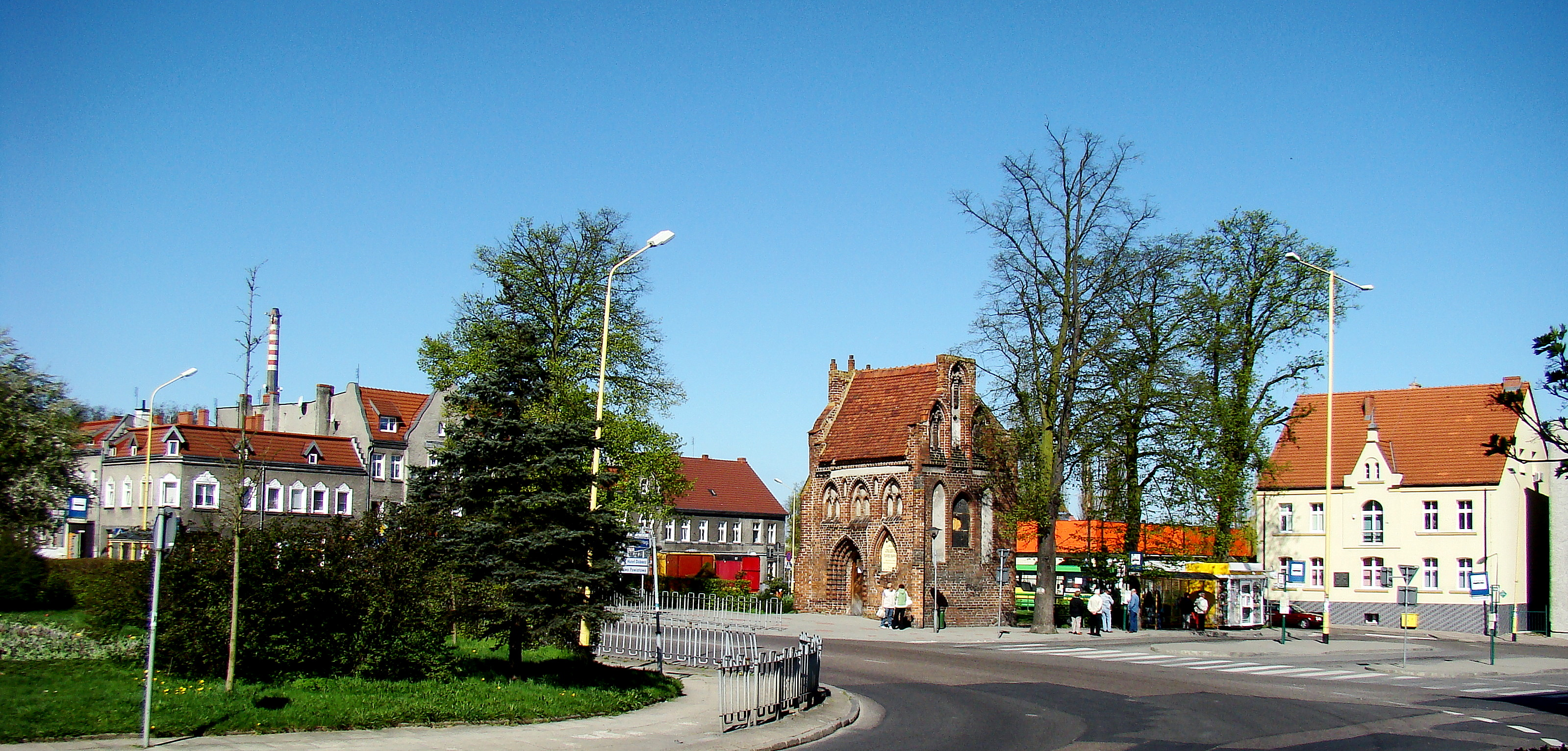
Brick Gothic Chapel (15th century) in The Chrobry Square in the Police Old Town

The county covers an area of 664.16 square kilometres (256.4 sq mi). As of 2006 its total population is 64,147, out of which the population of Police is 34,284, that of Nowe Warpno is 1,170 and the rural population is 28,693.

== Neighbouring counties ==
Police County is bordered by the city of Świnoujście (across the Szczecin Lagoon) to the north, and by Goleniów County, the city of Szczecin and Gryfino County to the east. It also borders Germany to the west (districts Vorpommern-Greifswald and Uckermark).

There is a common bus transport system in Police and Szczecin.

Police County has road connections with:

- Szczecin (Poland), A6 Motorway and roads No. 10, 13 and 115
- Pasewalk in Vorpommern-Greifswald (Germany), road No. 10
- Goleniów (Poland), Penkun in Uckermark and Berlin (Germany), A6 Motorway

== Administrative divisions ==
The county is subdivided into four gminas (two urban-rural and two rural). These are listed in the following table, in descending order of population.

Gmina	Type	Area (km^{2})	Population (2006)	Seat
Gmina Police	urban-rural	251.4	41,417	Police
Gmina Dobra	rural	110.3	12,361	Dobra
Gmina Kołbaskowo	rural	105.4	8,835	Kołbaskowo
Gmina Nowe Warpno	urban-rural	197.1	1,534	Nowe Warpno

== Nature, sights, tourist attractions and accommodation base ==
- The Wkrzanska Forest - Natura 2000 area; in the area of Świdwie Nature Reserve ("Swidwie" Sanctuary, Świdwie Lake near Tanowo and Dobra)
- Police - Canals - Natura 2000 area; ruins of the synthetic petrol plant (Hydrierwerke Pölitz – Aktiengeselschaft) in Police are a habitat of bats (barbastelle, greater mouse-eared bat, Daubenton's Bat, Natterer's bat, brown long-eared bat).
- Kayak-way on Gunica River from Węgornik through Tanowo, Tatynia and Wieńkowo to Police (Jasienica)
- The Szczecin Lagoon in the area of Police (Trzebież, Nowe Warpno)

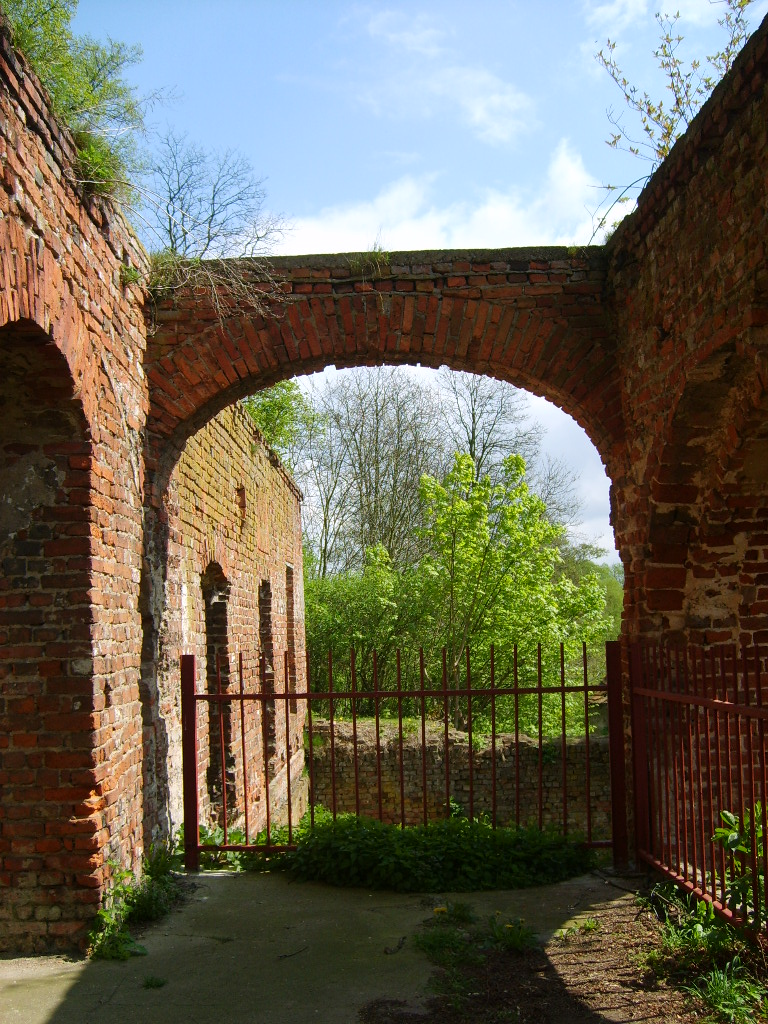
Ruin of Augustinians' cloister in Police - Jasienica (14th century)

Historical buildings in the area include:

- Brick Gothic Church in Police - Jasienica (14th/18th century)
- Ruin of Augustinians' cloister in Police - Jasienica (14th century)
- Brick Gothic Chapel (15th century) in The Chrobry Square in the Police Old Town
- Neo-Gothic Church (19th century) in the Police Old Town
- The Police Lapidary in The Staromiejski Park in the Police Old Town
- Tenement houses (19th century) in Police, Nowe Warpno and houses from this period in Trzebież
- Town hall in Nowe Warpno (14th century)
- Churches from 13th century in Kołbaskowo, Dobra, Wołczkowo, Buk, Wąwelnica, Mierzyn, Barnisław and Będargowo.

Accommodation facilities are consisted mainly of hotels in Police, Trzebież, Brzózki, Mierzyn, Lubieszyn, Przecław, Przęsocin and Ustowo (hostel and inn) and agritourism farms. e.g. in Rzędziny and Kołbaskowo. Accommodation base of Nowe Warpno is a resort, marina, camping, guest house and rooms in private homes.
