= Wietlina =

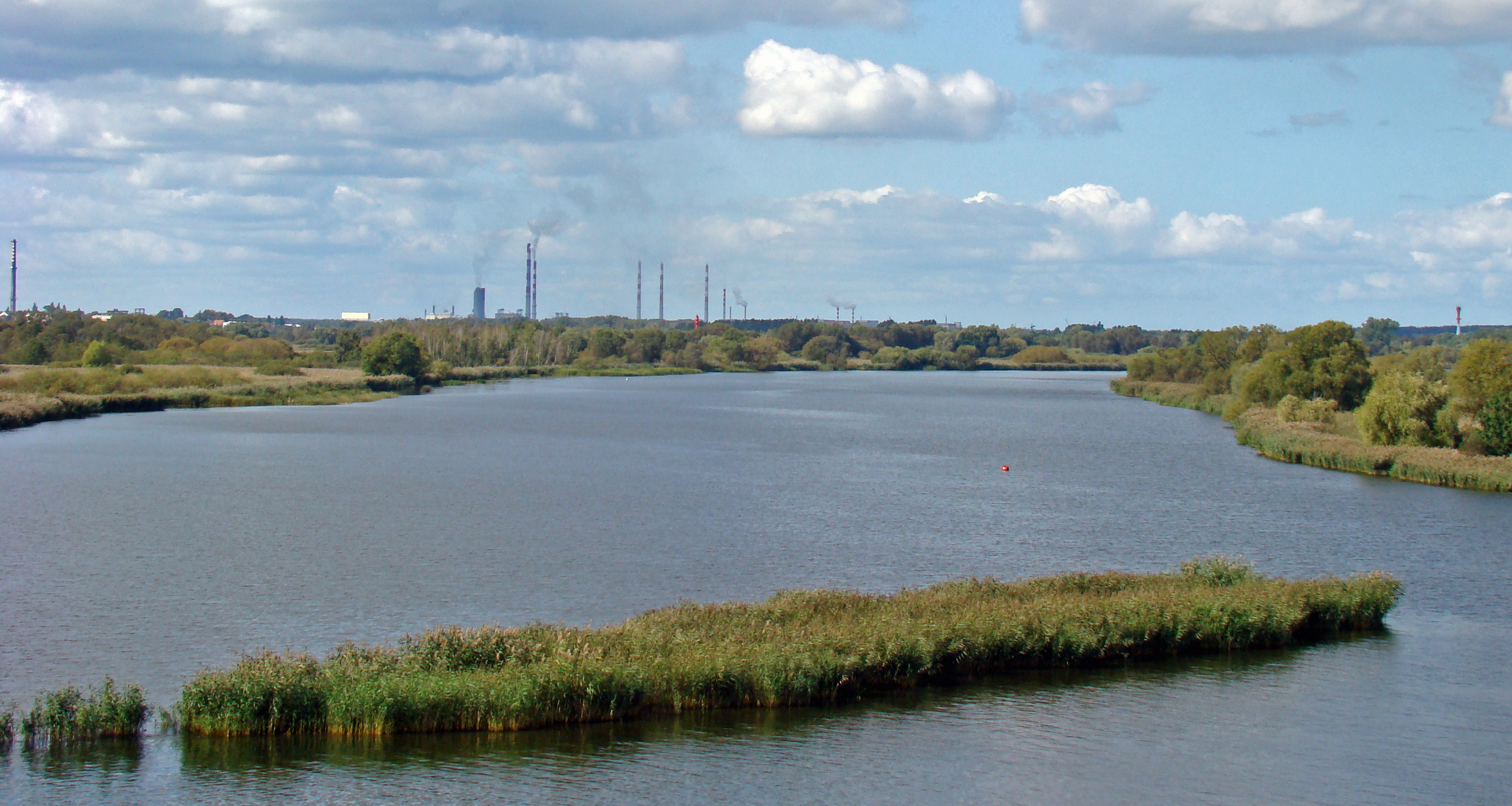

Location
- Country: Poland
- Voivodeship: West Pomeranian

Physical characteristics
- Source: Oder
  - location: northeast of the Skolwin neighborhood in Szczecin
  - coordinates: 53°31′53″N 14°37′41″E
- Mouth: Oder
  - location: southeast of the Port of Police
  - coordinates: 53°32′39″N 14°36′53″E
- Length: 3 km (1.9 mi)

Basin features
- Progression: Oder→ Baltic Sea

Wietlina is a river of Poland. It is an anabranch of the Oder near Police.
