= Gunica =

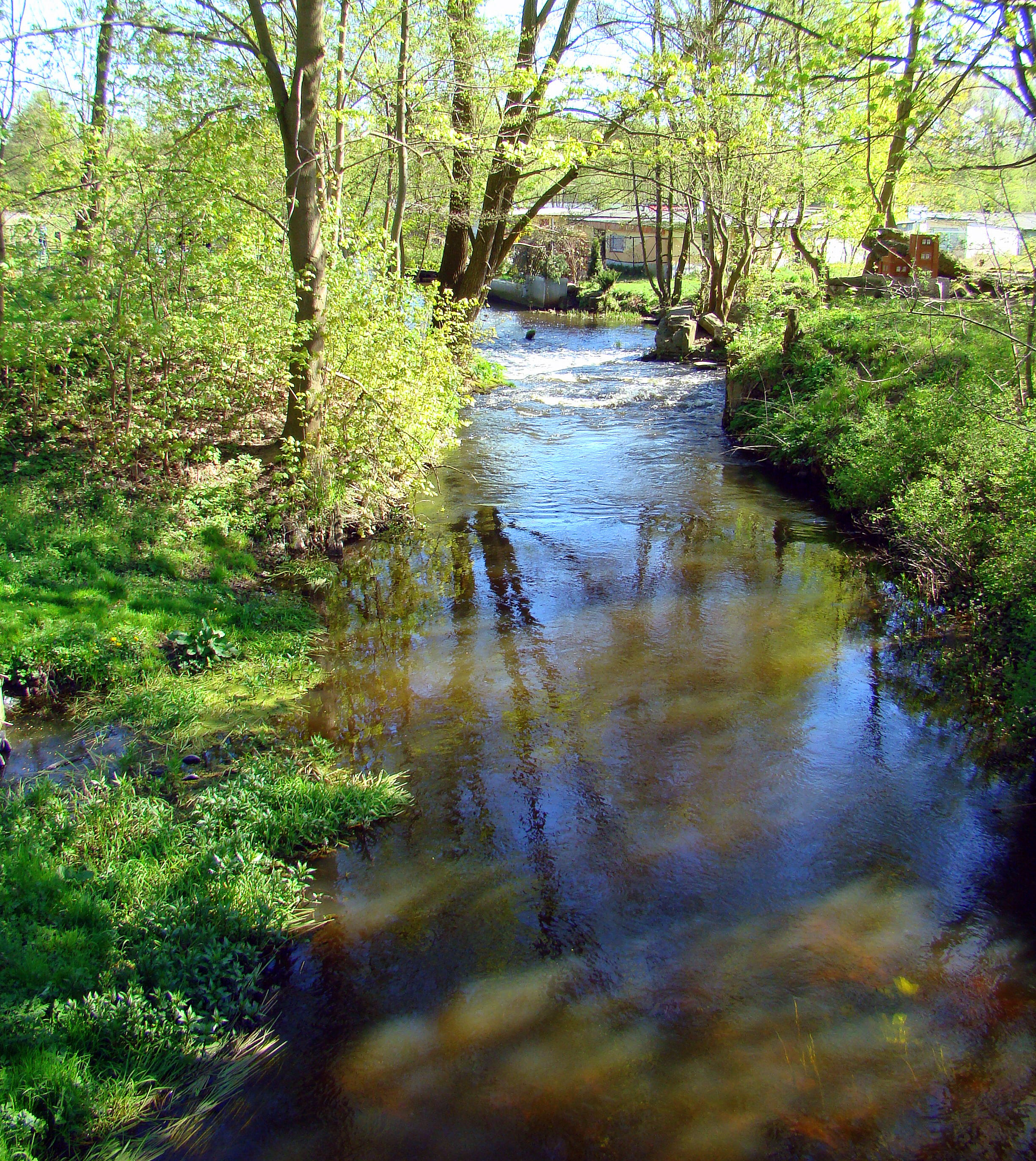
- Gunica in Jasienica

Location
- Country: Poland

Physical characteristics
- Source
  - location: north of Grambow, Germany
  - coordinates: 53°26′26.3″N 14°21′59.5″E
  - elevation: 17 m (56 ft)
- Mouth: Oder
  - location: Police, Poland
  - coordinates: 53°36′13″N 14°34′25″E
  - elevation: 0 m. (0 ft.)
- Length: 48.2 km (30.0 mi)
- Basin size: 240.1 km^{2} (92.7 mi^{2})

Basin features
- Progression: Oder→ Baltic Sea

Gunica is a small river in Poland, a left tributary of the Oder near Police.

== Geography ==
The river flows through the areas of the Wkrzańska Plain, also known as the Plain Plain. It flows from sources near the village of Łęgi in the commune of Dobra (Szczecińska). Flowing in the east, it continues through the surroundings of the village of Stolec, the Świdwie lake and the Świdwie reserve area, and the village of Węgornik in the Police commune. From the north the river passes through the villages of Tanowo Witorza, pass and Tatinie. Just behind Tatynia on the river, the boundary separating the city of Police from the village of Wieńkowo located on the River Gunica is established. Ok. 3 km after passing through the northern district of Police - Jasienica, it flows into the Oder bub, just at its confluence with Roztoka Odrzańska. In the area of the estuary to the waters of Gunica, they connect with the waters of the Jasienica stream.

There are fish such as perch, roach, zander, burbot, bream, tench, pike, etc. [necessary footnote] The area of the Lower Oder Valley near the mouth of the Gunica River falls within the borders of the Ujście Odry area and the Szczecin Lagoon of the Natura 2000 network. Puszcza Wkrzańska canoe trail (length approx. 20 km): Węgornik - Tanowo - Witorza - Tatynia - Wieńkowo - Police (Jasienica). There are several architectural monuments located on the banks of the river. This includes a church in Tatynia, St. Apostles Peter and Paul in Police-Jasienica, and the ruins of the Augustinian monastery in Police-Jasienica.

== See also ==
- Mała Gunica
