= Policki Nurt =

Coordinates: 53°33′30″N 14°34′55″E

Location
- Country: Poland

Policki Nurt is a branch of the river Oder in the town Police, northwestern Poland.
