= Szczecin metropolitan area =

Szczecin metropolitan area Aglomeracja szczecińska
- Urban area
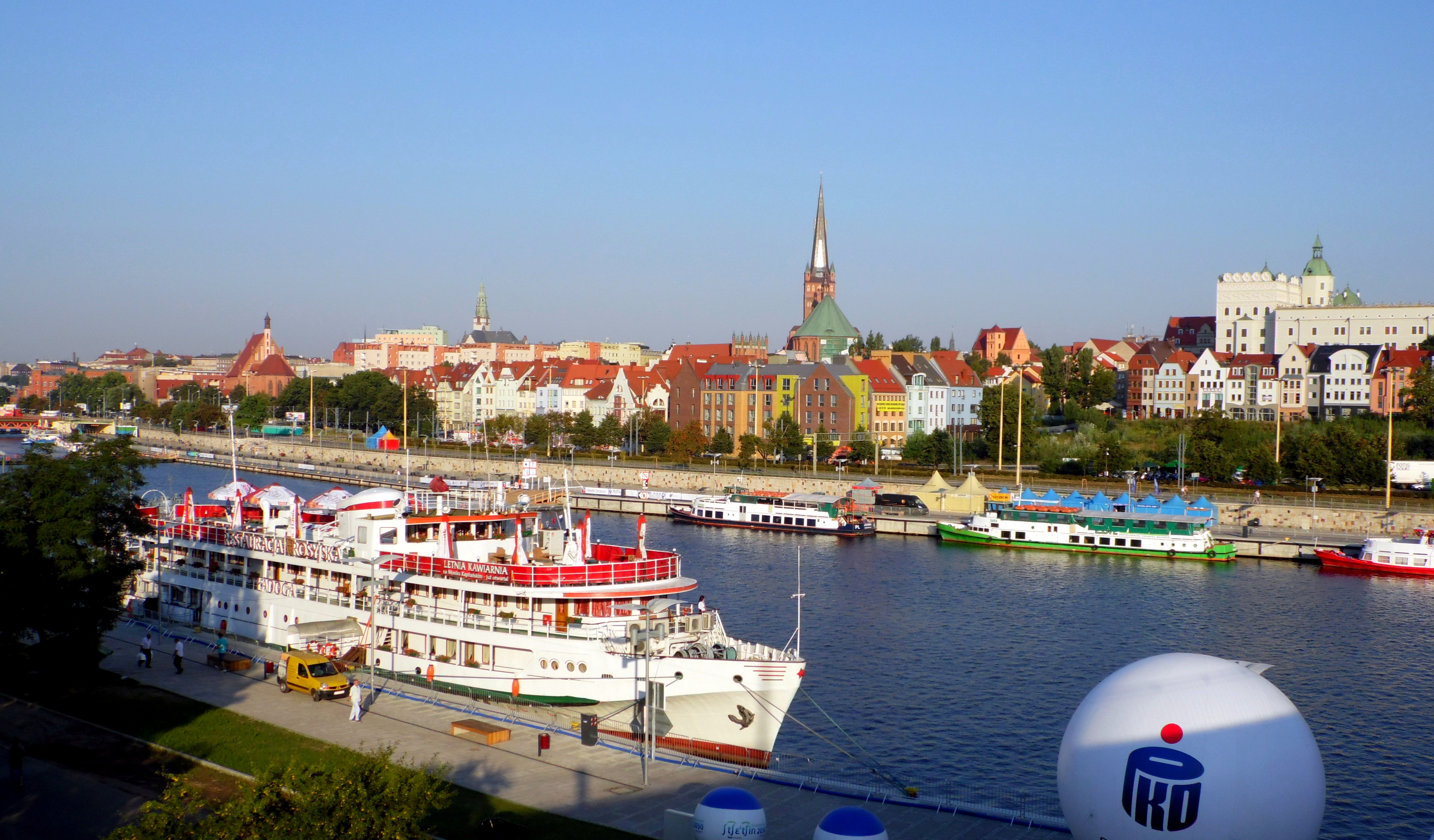
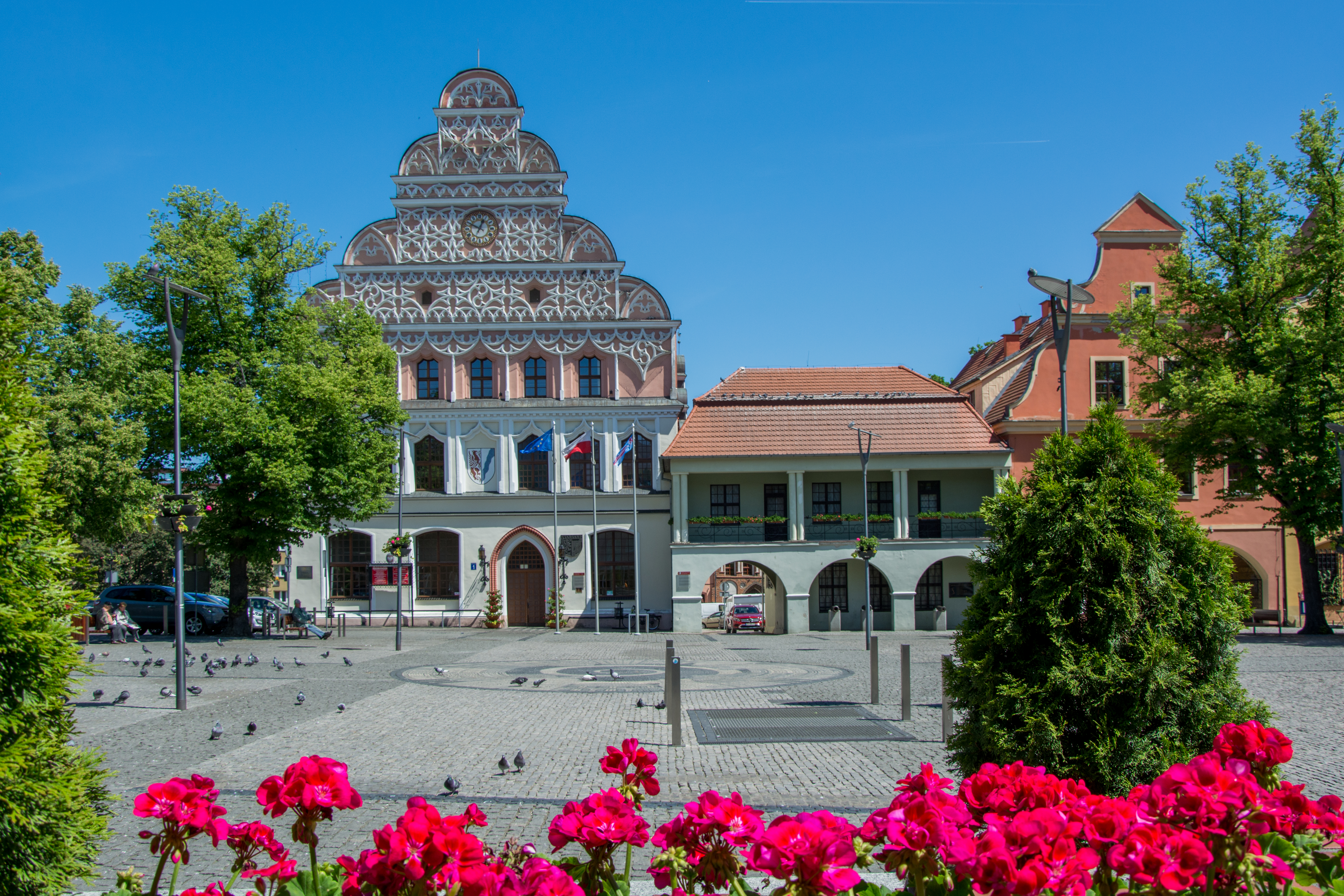
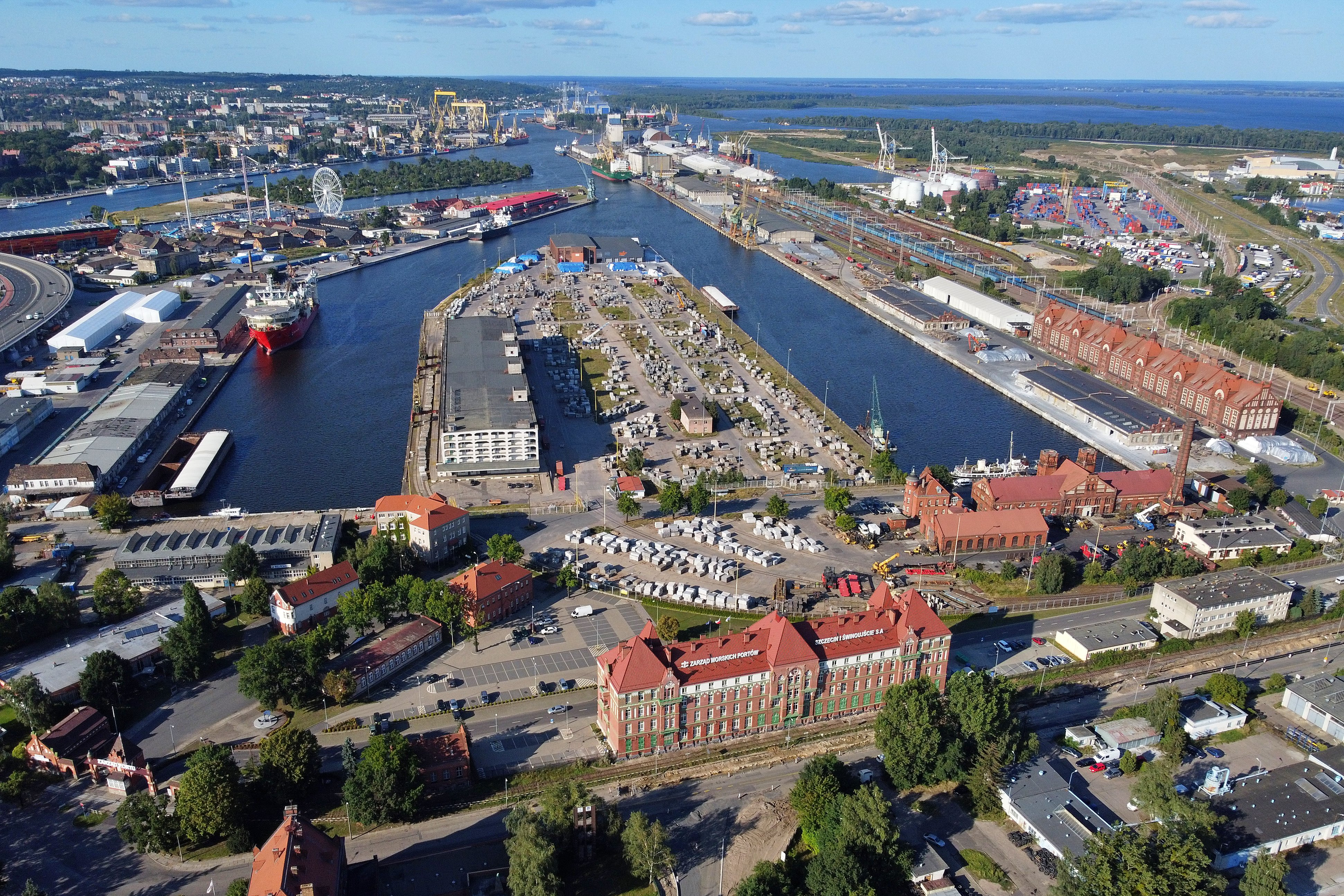
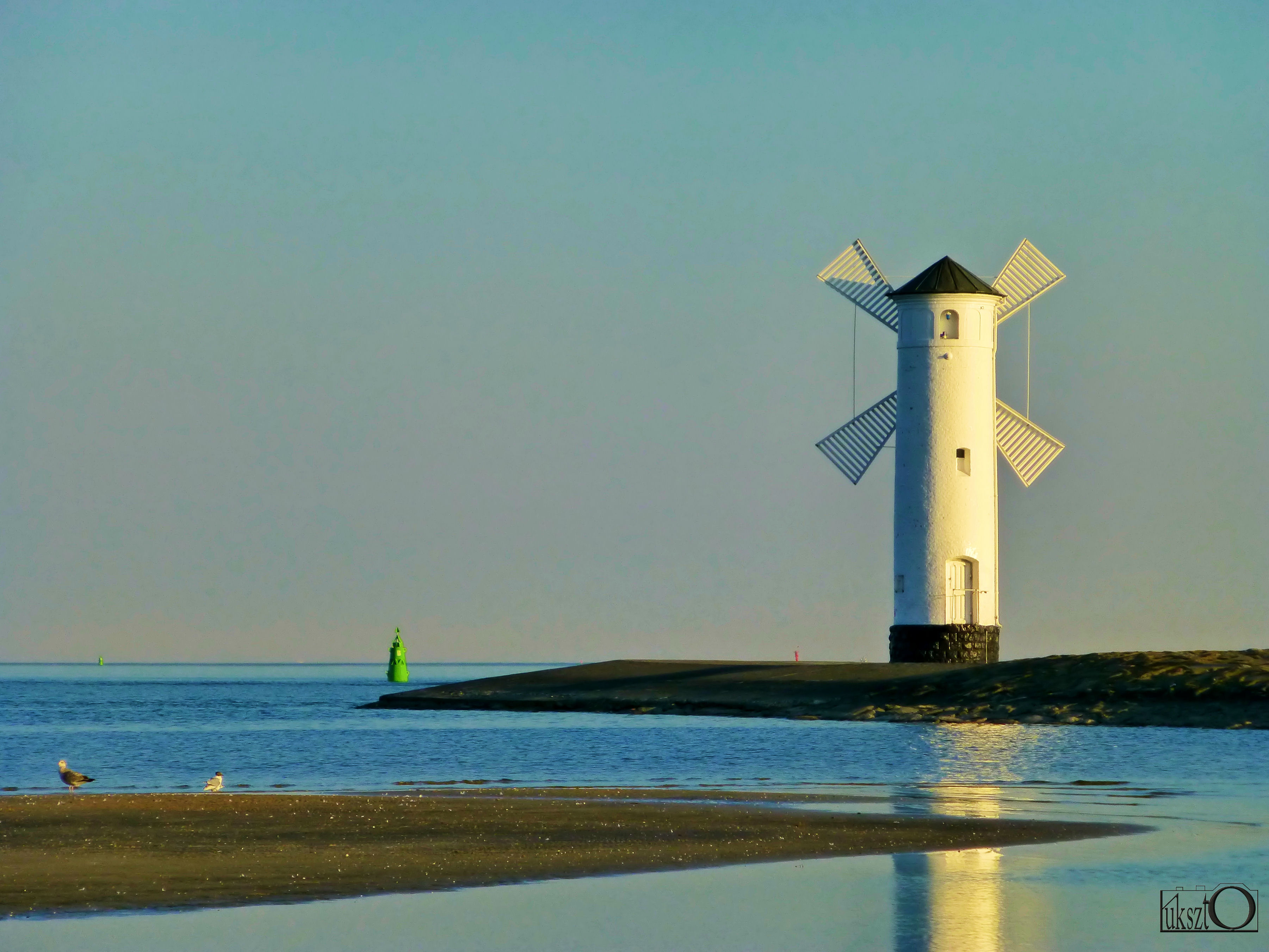
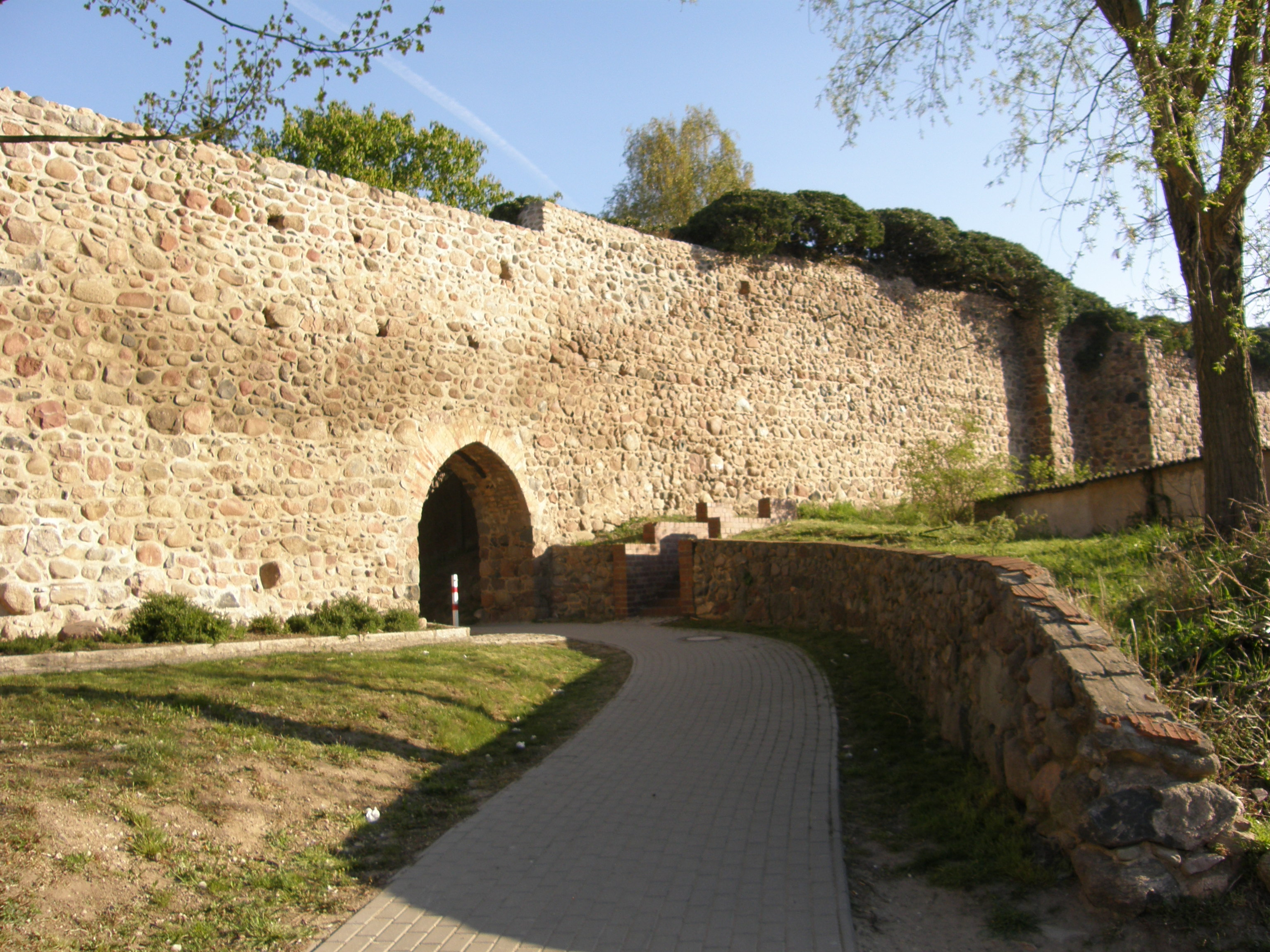
- From top, left to right: Skyline of Szczecin; City Hall and Market Square in Stargard; Port of Szczecin; Stawa Młyny in Świnoujście; Medieval town walls in Gartz

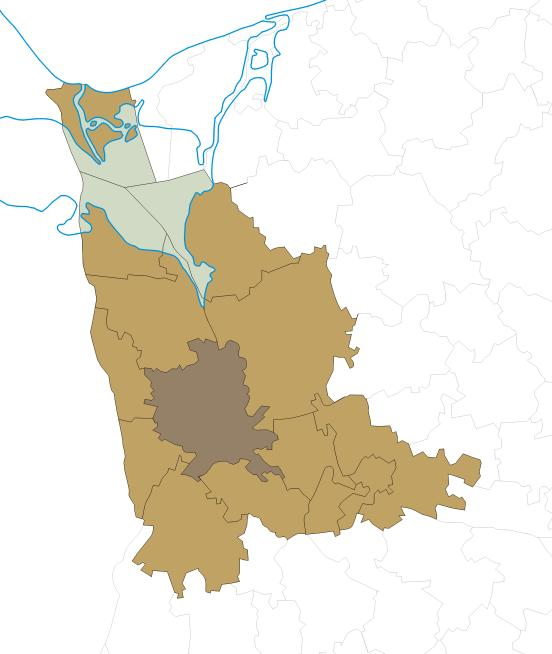
- Map of the Szczecin agglomeration (range of the agglomeration according to Swianiewicz) within Poland
- Country: Poland
- Voivodeship: West Pomeranian
- Largest city: Szczecin

Area
  - Metro: 2,795 km^{2} (1,079 sq mi)

Population
  - Metro: 750,000
  - Metro density: 270/km^{2} (690/sq mi)

GDP
  - Metro: €27.101 billion (2026)
- Time zone: UTC+1 (CET)
  - Summer (DST): UTC+2 (CEST)
- Primary airport: Solidarity Szczecin–Goleniów Airport

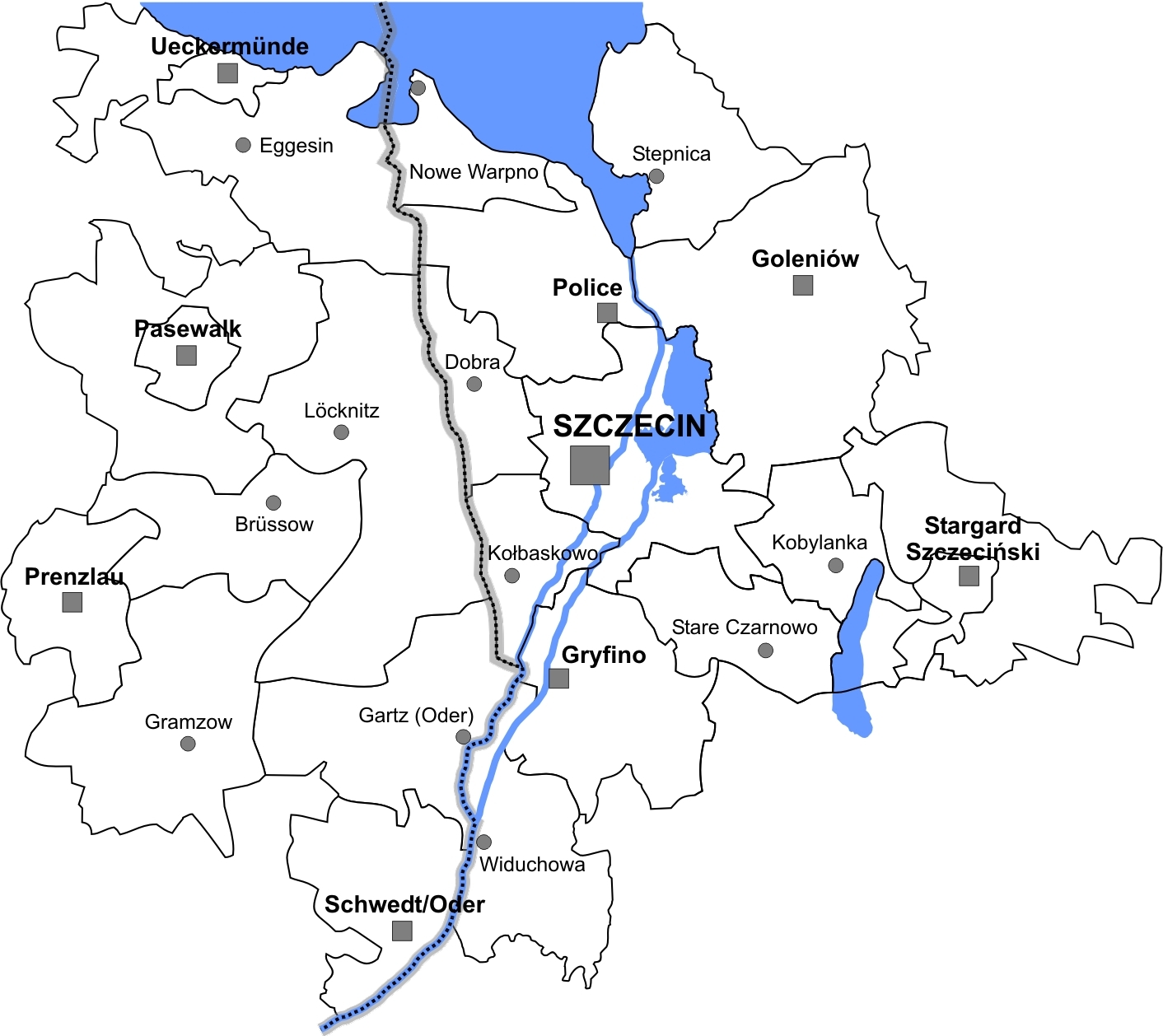
Map of the Szczecin region, not including administrative districts

The Szczecin metropolitan area is the urban agglomeration of the city of Szczecin and surrounding towns in the Polish-German border area.

The Larger Urban Zone defined by Eurostat includes 777,806 people living on 5249 km^{2} in the area (2012). It includes the cities and towns of Stargard, Świnoujście, Police, Schwedt, Goleniów, Gryfino, Prenzlau, Pasewalk, Ueckermünde, Eggesin, Gartz, Stepnica, Penkun, Brüssow and Nowe Warpno. There are a group of villages situated between Szczecin and towns of the agglomeration. The villages of Mierzyn, Löcknitz, Przecław, Dobra, Trzebież and Kobylanka are parts of the urban system.

It is the second largest metropolitan area in Pomerania after the Tricity metropolitan area.

Since 2012, the agglomeration is actively developed as the core of a wider European metropolitan area, likely including the German districts of Mecklenburgische Seenplatte, Vorpommern-Greifswald, Uckermark and the West Pomeranian districts neighbouring Szczecin in Poland.

The German part of the Szczecin metropolitan area contains municipalities with some of the highest percentages of Polish residents in Germany, such as Gartz, Löcknitz and Mescherin.

== Transport and economy ==
The ports of Szczecin, Świnoujście and Police are located within the metropolitan area.

The local airport is the Solidarity Szczecin–Goleniów Airport near Goleniów, whereas the main railway station is the Szczecin Główny railway station, with direct connections to other major cities in Poland, such as Warsaw, Kraków, Wrocław, Łódź, Poznań, Tricity, Bydgoszcz, Lublin, Białystok and Katowice.

The Świnoujście LNG terminal is located in Świnoujście.

== Sights ==
Historic landmarks of the Szczecin metropolitan area include the Ducal Castle and National Museum in Szczecin, the Gothic Collegiate church of the Blessed Virgin Mary in Stargard and the Kołbacz Abbey, with the latter two listed as Historic Monuments of Poland.

Świnoujście, the third largest city of the metropolitan area, is a spa town. The Świnoujście Lighthouse is the tallest brick lighthouse in the world. The War Cemetery in Stargard is the burial place of over 5,000 Allied soldiers and prisoners of war from both world wars, including Polish, French, Serbian/Yugoslav, Russian/Soviet, Italian, Romanian, Belgian, British, Moroccan, Portuguese and Dutch. There is a memorial to British pilots of the No. 617 Squadron RAF shot down by Germany in Karsibór, Świnoujście.

A notable phenomenon on a worldly scale is the Crooked Forest outside the town of Gryfino.

== Sports ==
Professional sports teams
Club	Sport	League	Trophies
Wilki Morskie Szczecin	Basketball (men's)	Polish Basketball League	1 Polish Championship (2023)
Spójnia Stargard	Basketball (men's)	Polish Basketball League	0
KPS Chemik Police	Volleyball (women's)	Tauron Liga	11 Polish Championships; 10 Polish Cups
Pogoń Szczecin	Football (men's)	Ekstraklasa	0
Pogoń Szczecin	Football (women's)	Ekstraliga	1 Polish Championship (2024)
Świt Szczecin	Football (men's)	II liga	0
Pogoń Szczecin	Handball (women's)	Liga Centralna	3 Polish Championships (1983, 1986, 1991); 4 Polish Cups (1971, 1980, 1986, 1992)
Pogoń Szczecin	Handball (men's)	Liga Centralna	0

== Subcenters ==
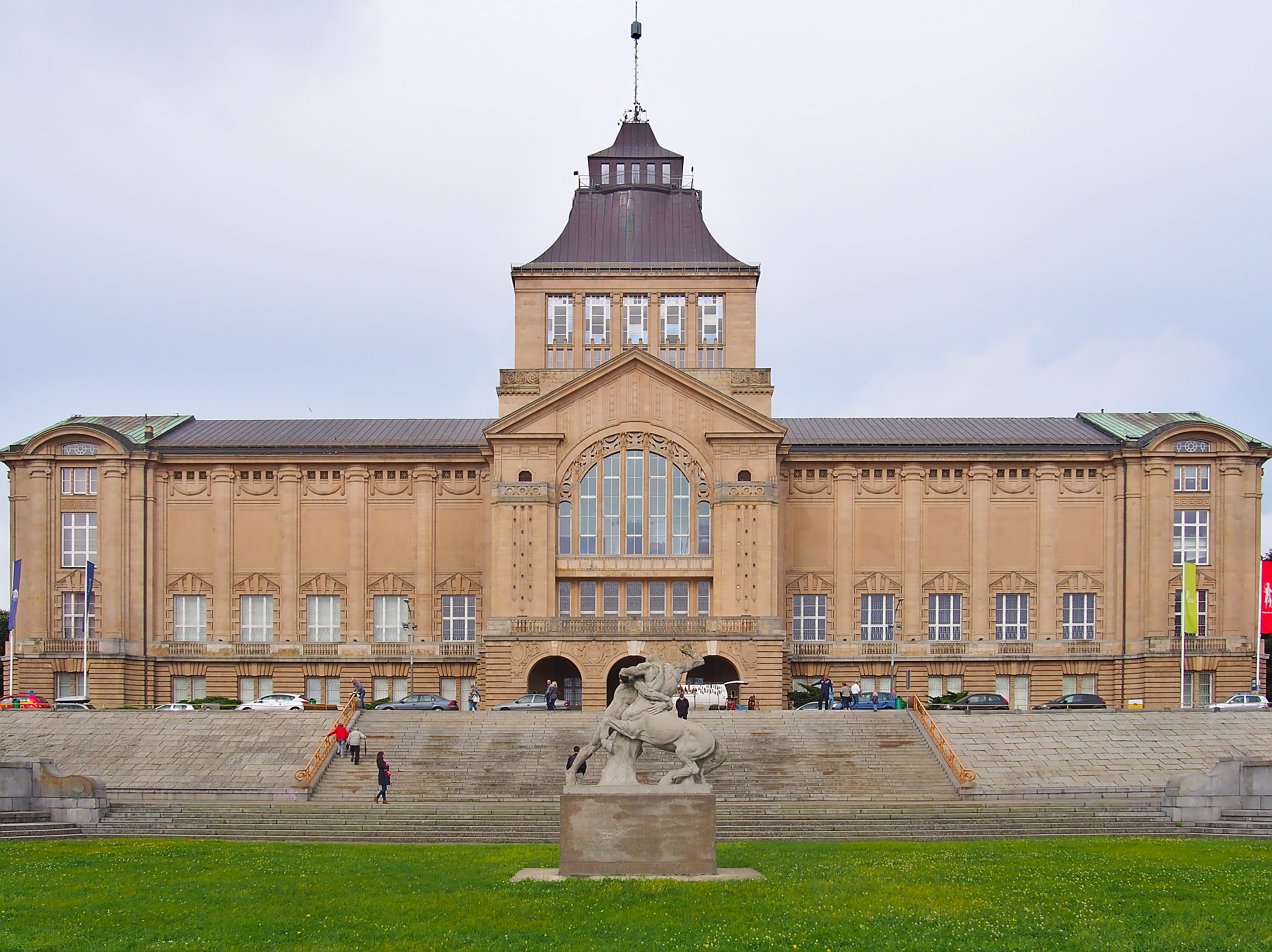
National Museum in Szczecin

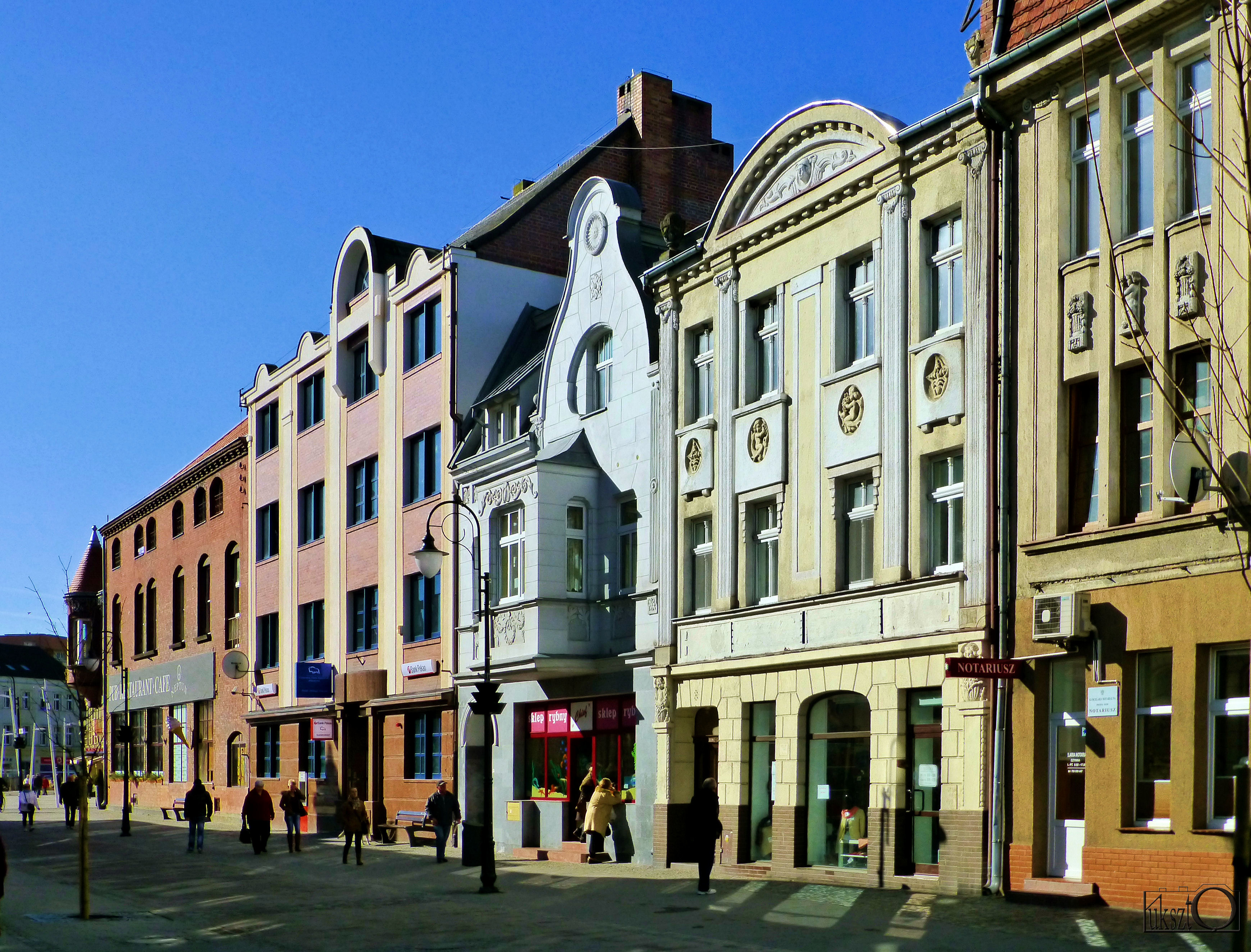
Historic tenement houses in Świnoujście

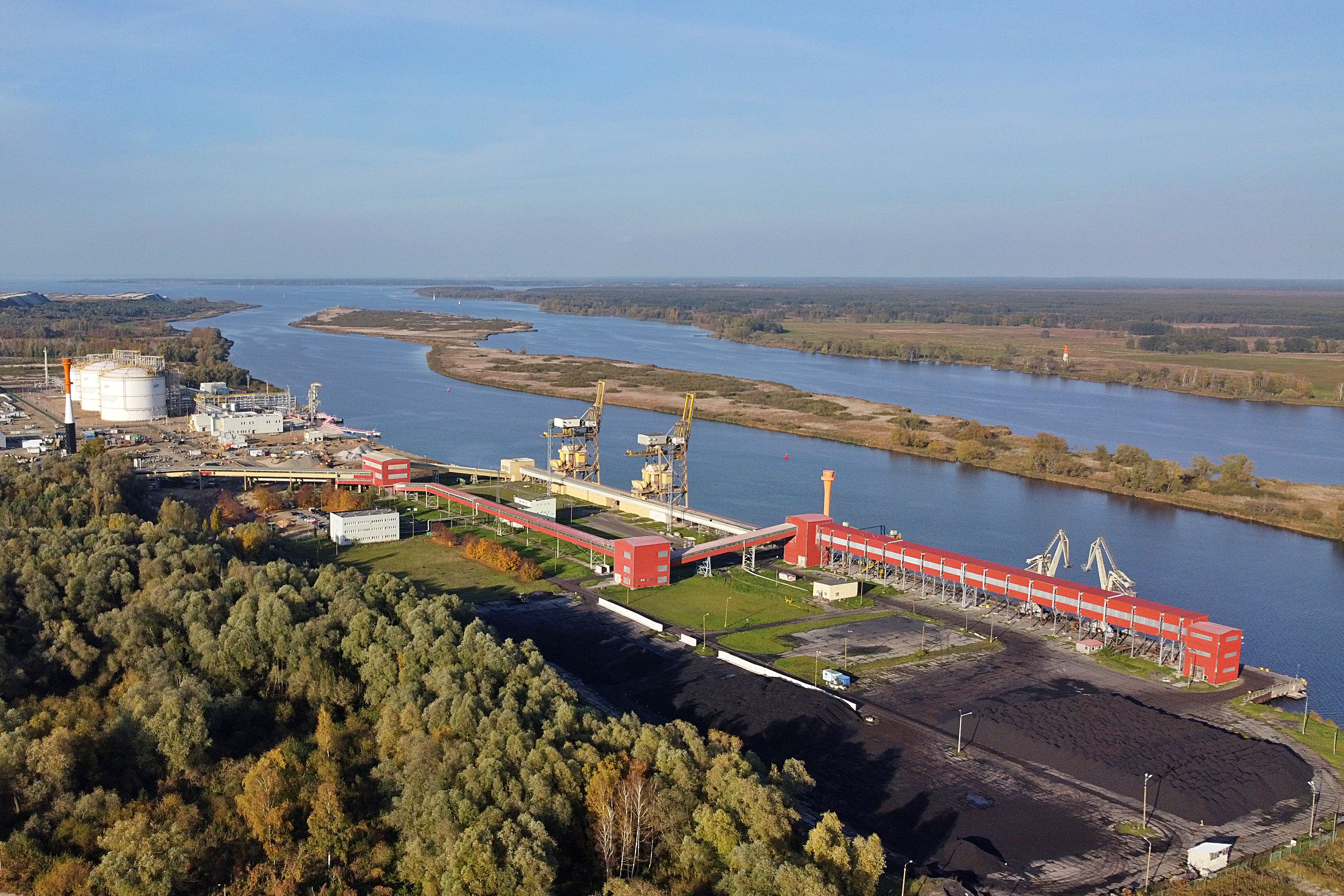
Port of Police

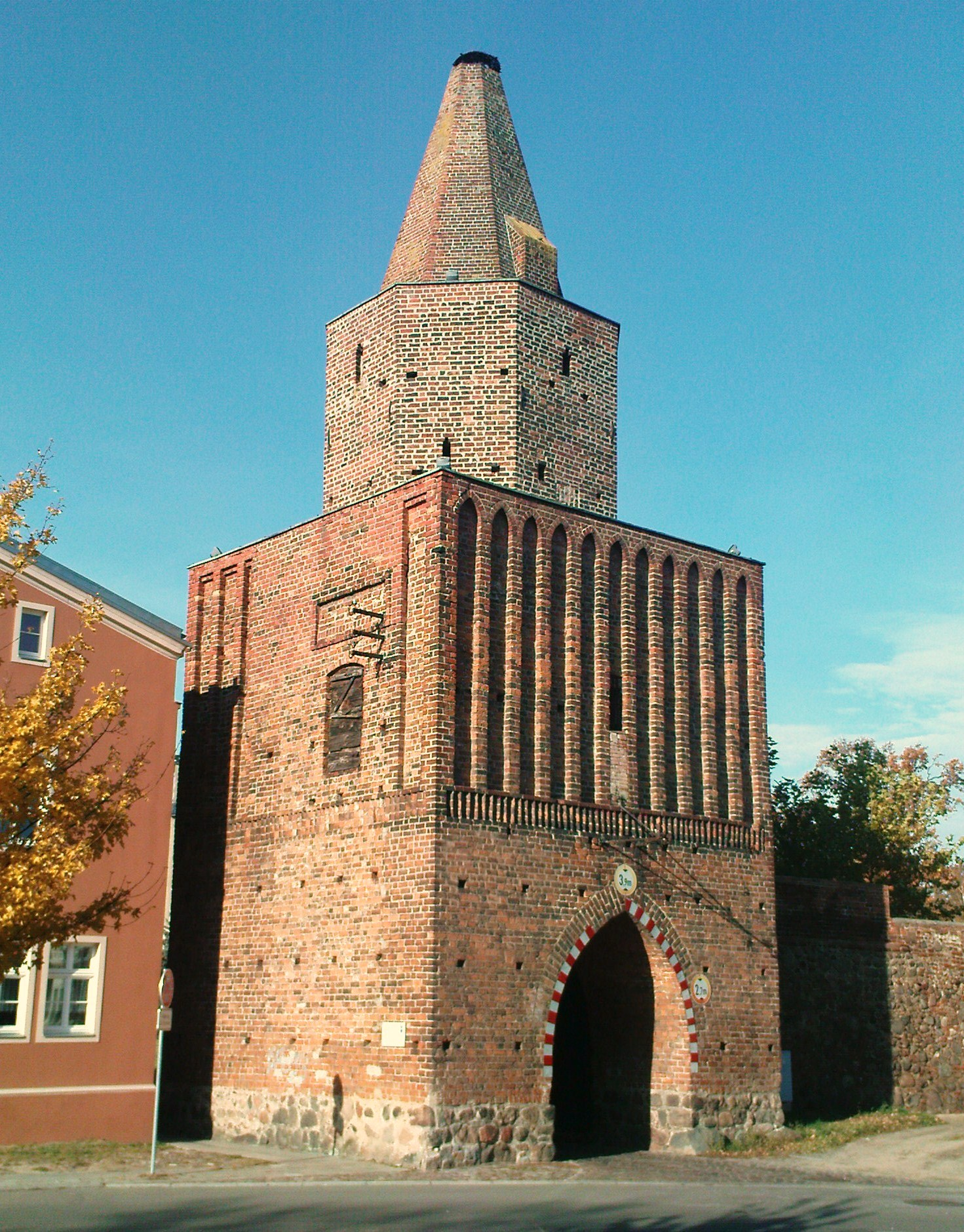
Medieval Mill Gate in Pasewalk

== See also ==
- Metropolitan areas in Poland
