= Ludwig Hollonius =

German playwright

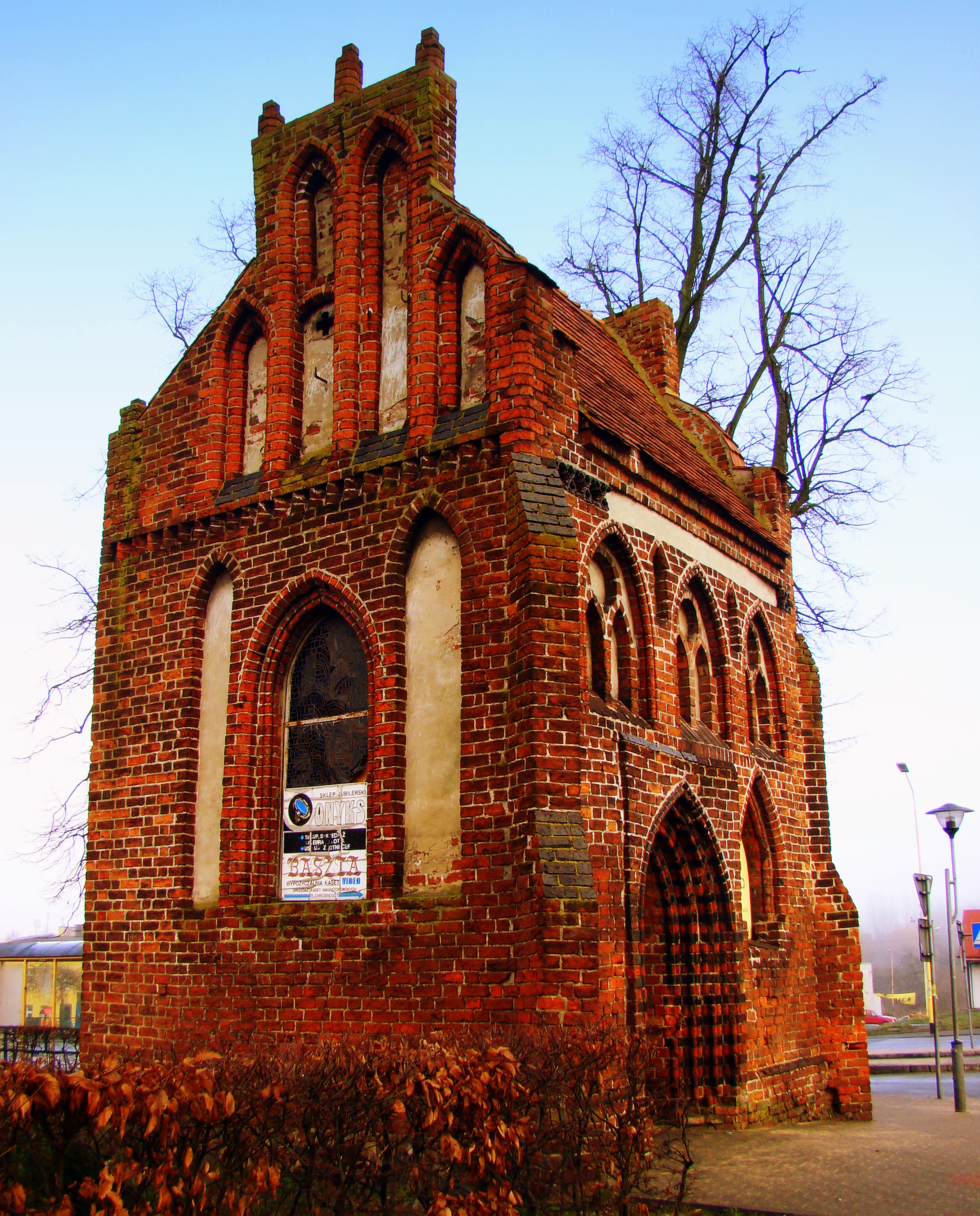
Sacristy of the former St. Mary's Church from the 15th century on the market in the Old Town in Police

Ludwig Hollonius (c. 1570 – 1621) was a German playwright.

== Pastor ==
As a Lutheran pastor in Pölitz (Police), Pomerania, he carefully refined his plays so that they met with the approval of his benefactor, Henry Julius, Duke of Brunswick-Lüneburg, who was responsible for building up Wolfenbüttel so much that it was the most heavily reinforced fortress in the Thirty Years' War.

== Chief work ==
Hollonius is chiefly remembered for his Latin opus, a comic farce, Somnium Vitae Humanae ("Dream of a Human Life"). In this, an ordinary man, upon being made king for a day, is showered with all the flattering praise a king must confront daily; he must also deal with the concerns of his office, to which, in the form of advice to the circle of sycophantic hangers on around him, he attempts to frame in the form of rhetorical questions, answered by common-sense answers.
