= Mała Gunica =

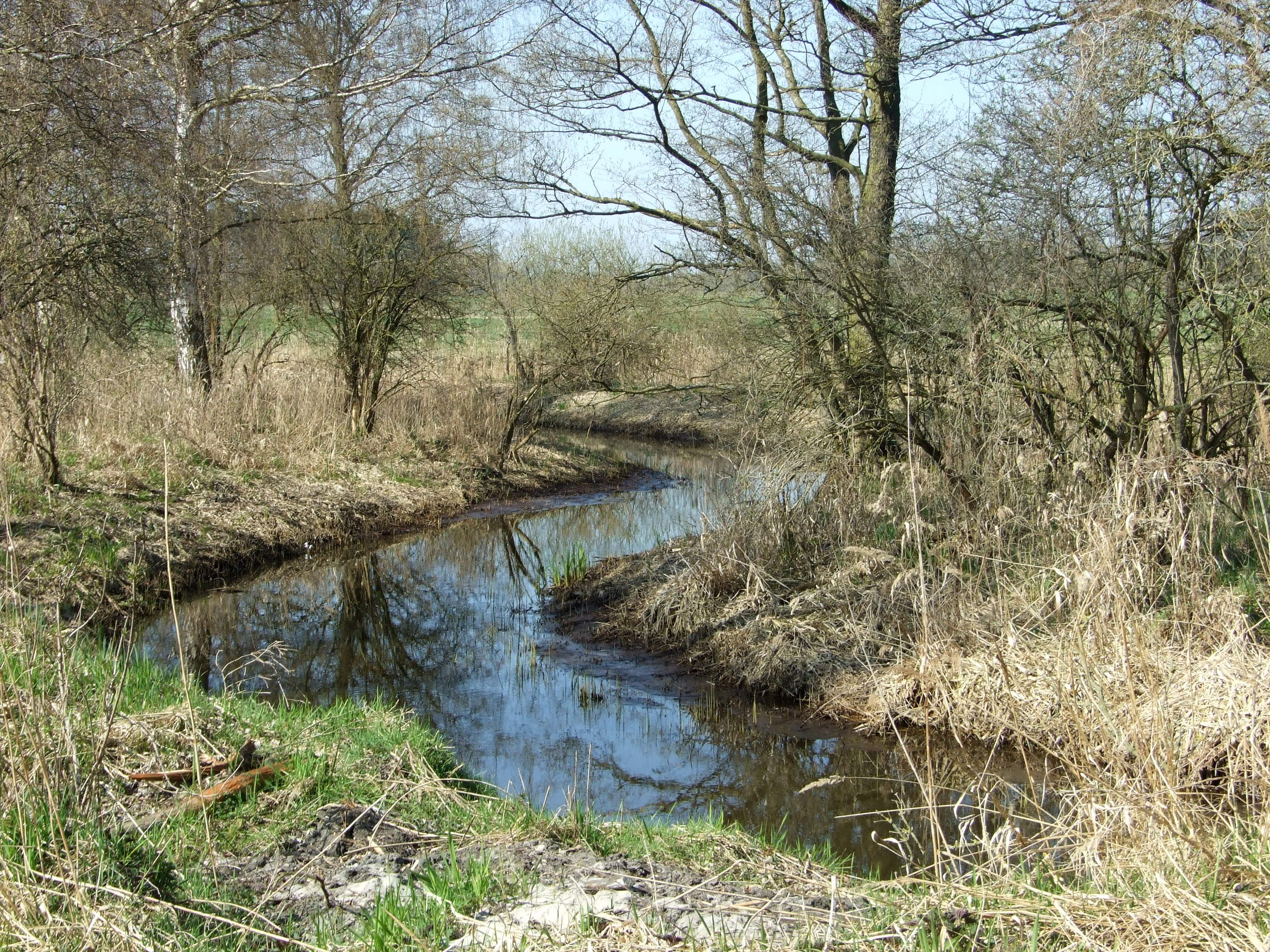
- Mała Gunica near village

Location
- Country: Poland
- Voivodeship: West Pomeranian
- County (Powiat): Police
- Gmina: Gmina Dobra (Szczecińska)

Physical characteristics
- Source: Lipka
  - location: northwest of Wąwelnica
  - coordinates: 53°27′29.5″N 14°22′51.0″E
  - elevation: 27 m (89 ft)
- Mouth: Gunica
  - location: south of Węgornik, Gmina Police
  - coordinates: 53.5503°N 14.3976°E
- Length: 14.71 km (9.14 mi)
- Basin size: 44.39 km^{2} (17.14 mi^{2})

Basin features
- Progression: Gunica→ Oder→ Baltic Sea

Mała Gunica is a river of Poland, a tributary of the Gunica near Węgornik. The Mala Gunica River is the longest river in the Gminie Dobra, and it flows from Lubieszyna to Dobrej.
