= Jasienica, Police =

District in Police, Poland

Jasienica
- District
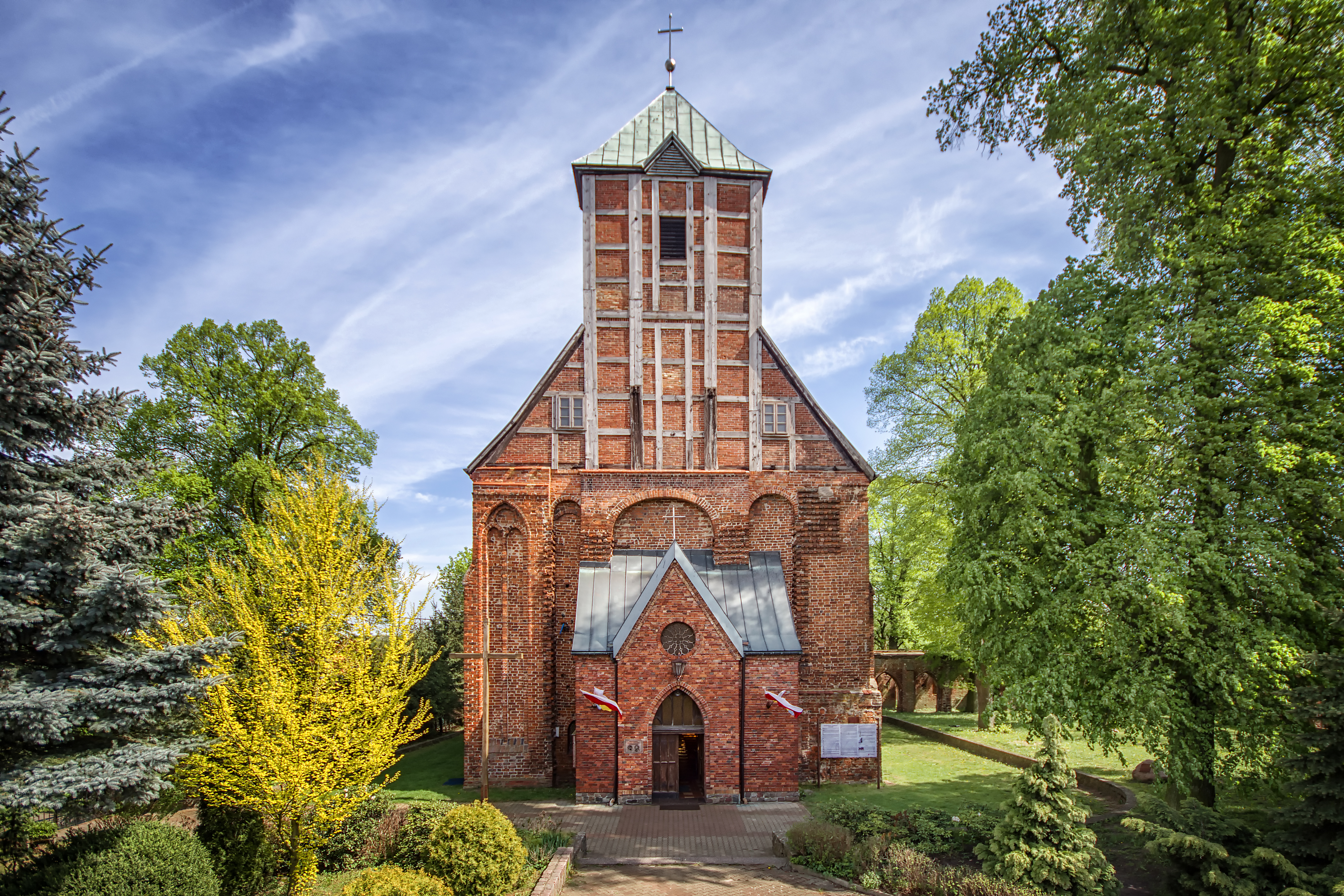
- Gothic Saints Peter and Paul church

- Location of Jasienica within Police (in red)
- Coordinates: 53°35′41″N 14°32′14″E
- Country: Poland
- Voivodeship: West Pomeranian
- County: Police
- Town: Police
- Within town limits: 1973
- Time zone: UTC+1:00 (CET)
  - Summer (DST): UTC+2:00 (CEST)
- Vehicle registration: ZPL

Jasienica (German: Jasenitz) is a district of Police, Poland, located in the northern part of the town, in the Pomerania region. In the High and Late Middle Ages, the village was the site of Jasienica Abbey, now in ruins.

== Gunica River and a kayak-way ==
In Jasienica there is a confluence of the Gunica - a small river used as a kayak-way from Węgornik through Tanowo, Tatynia and Wieńkowo. Gunica flows into Oder in the north part of the town of Police.

== Jasienica Abbey ==
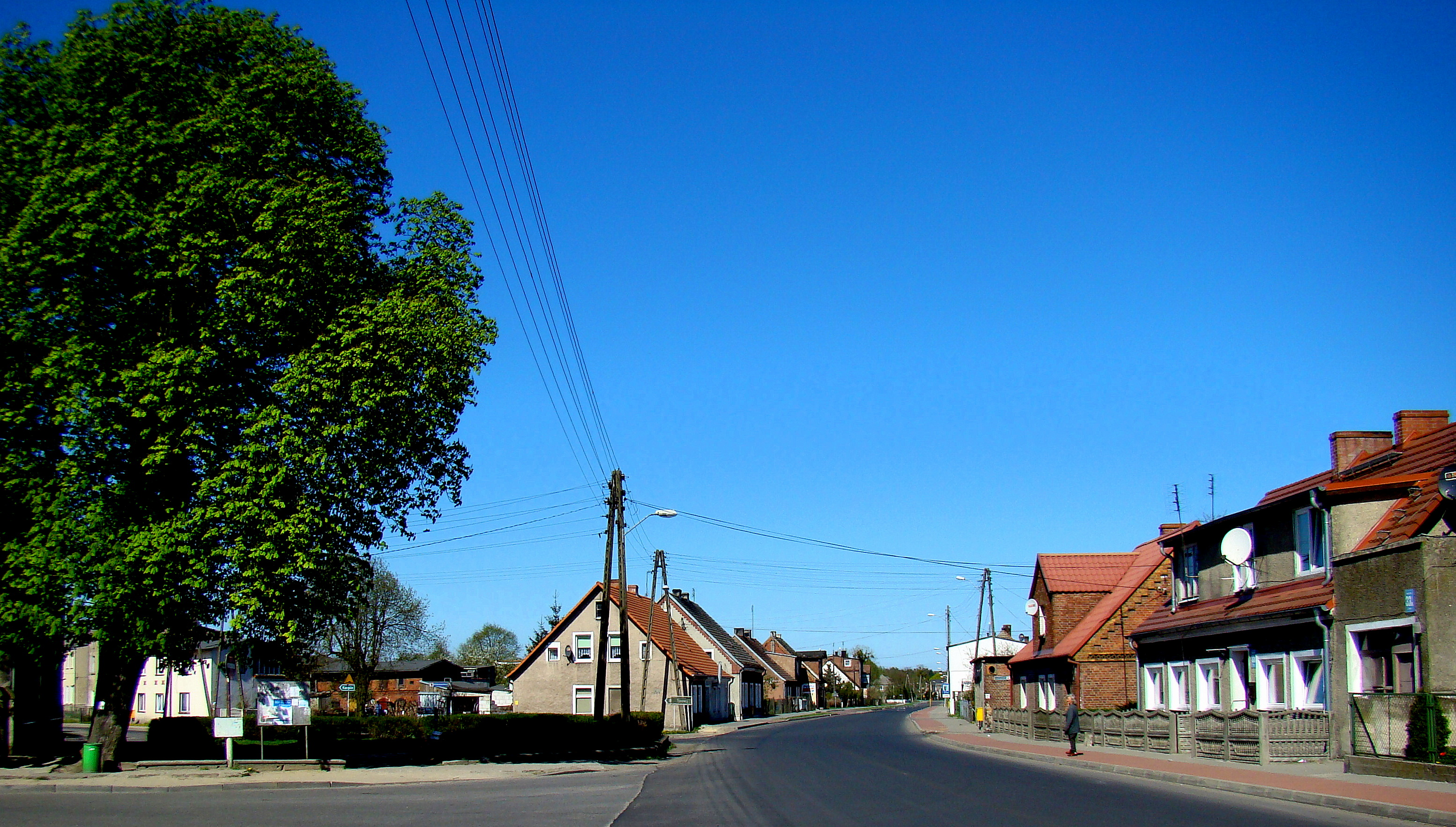
Ulica Piastów

An Augustinian abbey existed from the 14th century until its dissolution during the Protestant Reformation, when the abbeys of the Duchy of Pomerania were turned into secular domains of the local dukes. The buildings are now in ruins. Each year at the end of August there is Augustinian Fair (Polish: Jarmark Augustiański) organized in the area of ruins of the abbey, with parade residents of the estate in historical costumes, lectures, artistic performances and stalls with traditional products.

== Transport ==
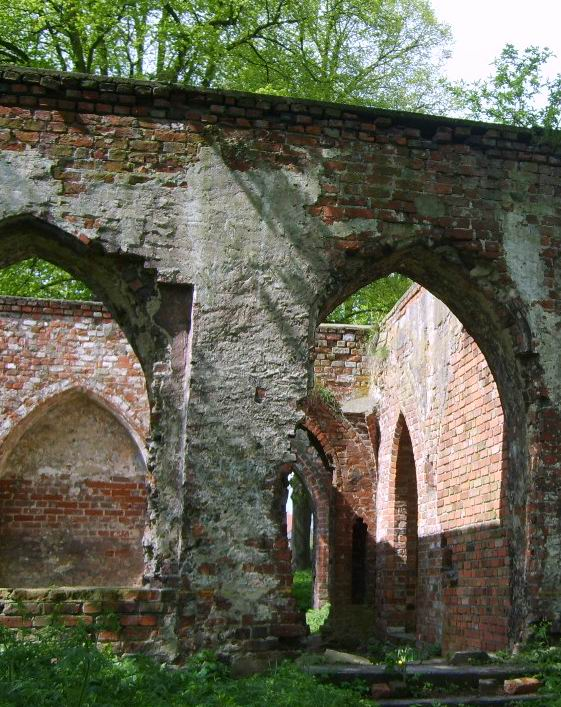
Fragment of ruin of Augustinians' cloister (14th century)

- Roads:
  - from the centre of Police to Trzebież and Nowe Warpno No. 114
  - to Tanowo, over Tatynia
- Main streets in a district:
  - ul. Jasienicka
  - ul. Dworcowa
  - ul. Piastów
- Szczecin - Police - Trzebież Railway
- Public transport:
  - bus lines 101 (to the Old Town of Police and a centre of Szczecin), 103 (to the Old Town and the New Town of Police and Trzeszczyn, Tanowo, Pilchowo and Szczecin-Głębokie), and 111 (to the Old Town and the New Town of Police)
  - LS "linia samorządowa" (different type of ticket) Police - Trzebież

== Notable residents ==
- Hans Modrow (1928–2023), German politician
