= Police Industrial Park =

Industrial park in Police, Poland

Police Industrial Park (Polish: Policki Park Przemysłowy), also known as Infrapark Police, is an industrial park in Police, a district town in north-west Poland (West Pomeranian Voivodeship). The total area is about 140 ha. In the area: Zakłady Chemiczne Police SA, ship (Police Harbour (Police) and Szczecin-Świnoujście Harbour (Szczecin and Świnoujście)), road and rail transport, Szczecin-Goleniów "Solidarność" Airport (Goleniów) and a centre of Police.
