= Karpina =

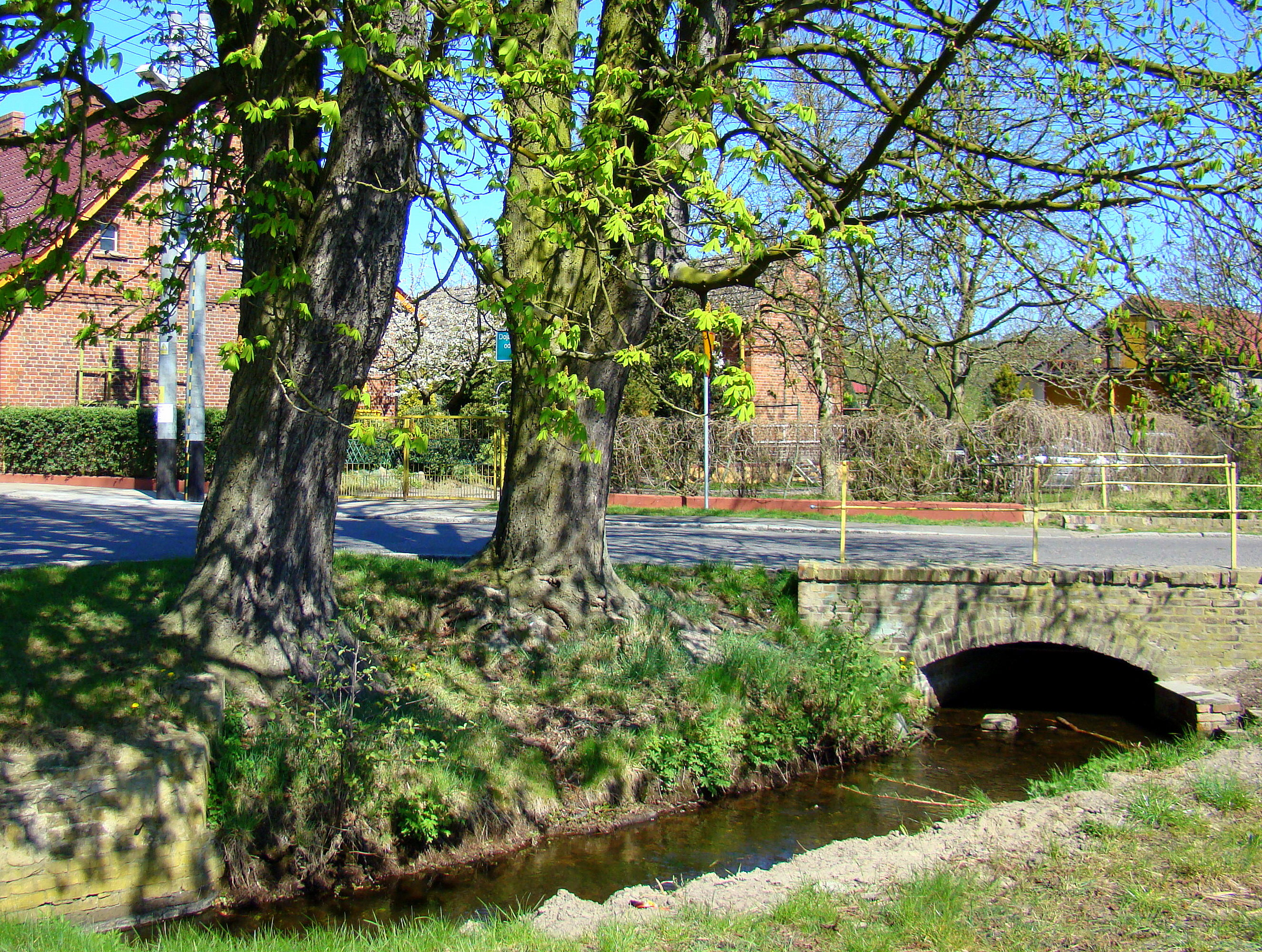
- Karpina in Uniemyśl

Location
- Country: Poland

Physical characteristics
- Source: Karpino Lake
  - location: Uniemyśl, West Pomeranian Voivodeship, Poland
- Mouth
  - location: Oder, Poland
  - coordinates: 53.6275°N 14.5544°E
- Length: 14 km (8.7 mi)

Basin features
- Progression: Oder→ Baltic Sea

Karpina is a river in Police County in the West Pomeranian Voivodeship. The river flows through Ueckermünde Heath.

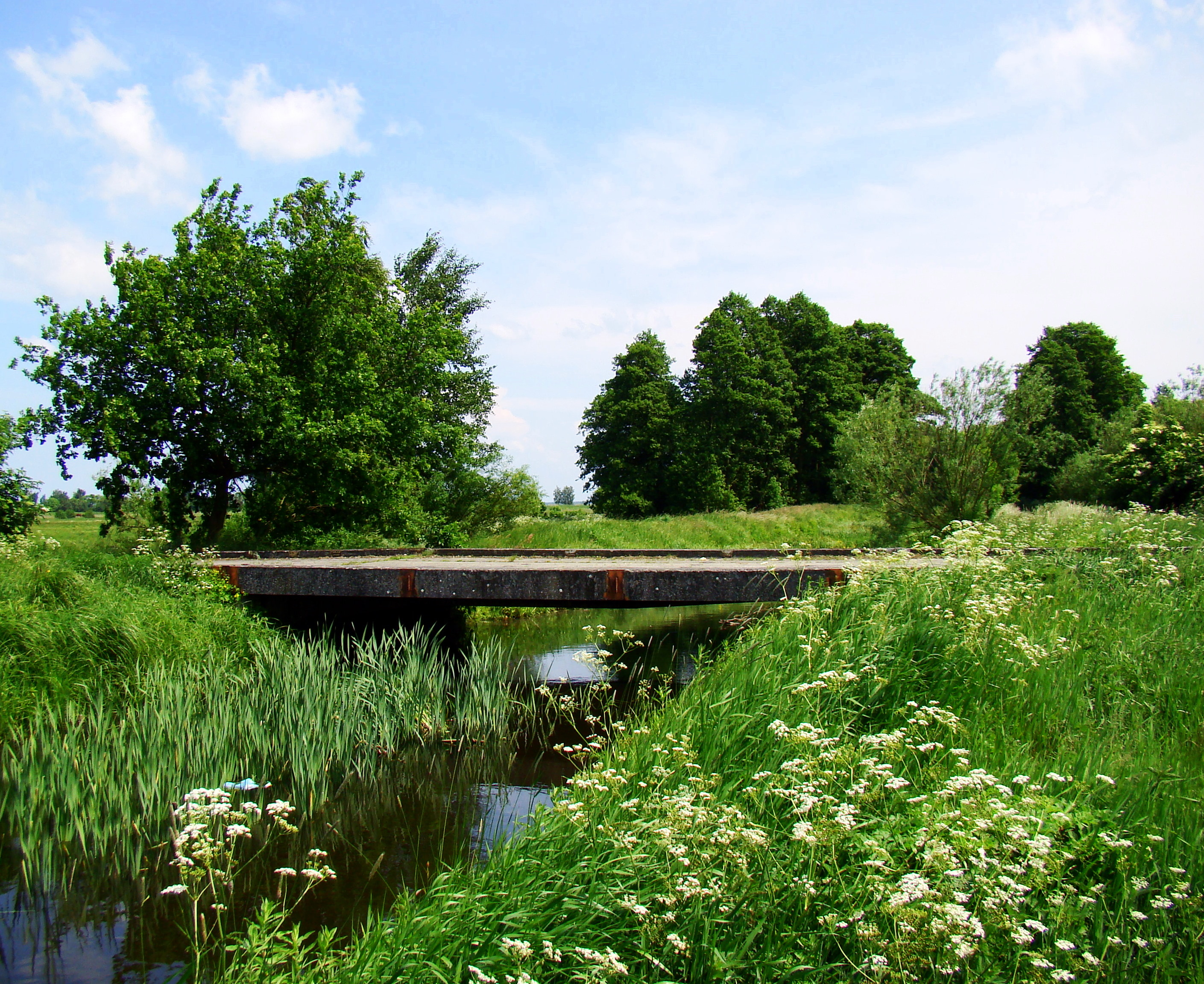
Karpina river ending

The river flows out of Karpino Lake. Flowing into the eastern direction through the villages Karpin, Drogoradz and after around 2.5 km flows into the estuary of the river Oder.

The name Karpina was officially introduced in the year 1949, replacing the former German name Karpiner Bach.
