= Adrian Klimczak =

Polish footballer (born 1997)

Personal information
- Date of birth: 26 July 1997 (age 29)
- Place of birth: Police, Poland
- Height: 1.83 m (6 ft 0 in)
- Position: Left-back

Team information
- Current team: Stomil Olsztyn

Youth career
- Chemik Police

Senior career*
| Years | Team | Apps | (Gls) |
| 2014–2015 | Chemik Police | 26 | (0) |
| 2015–2017 | Gryf Wejherowo | 51 | (6) |
| 2017–2018 | Olimpia Grudziądz | 17 | (0) |
| 2018 | Arka Gdynia | 1 | (0) |
| 2019–2022 | ŁKS Łódź | 82 | (1) |
| 2022–2023 | Wieczysta Kraków | 28 | (1) |
| 2024 | Chrobry Głogów | 2 | (0) |
| 2024–2026 | Olimpia Grudziądz | 20 | (1) |
| 2026– | Stomil Olsztyn | 0 | (0) |
- * Club domestic league appearances and goals as of 16:06, 2 June 2026 (UTC)

Adrian Klimczak (born 26 July 1997) is a Polish professional footballer who plays as a left-back for IV liga Warmia-Masuria club Stomil Olsztyn.

== Career ==
=== ŁKS Łódź ===
On 19 December 2018, ŁKS Łódź announced the signing of Klimczak on a contract until 2021.

=== Wieczysta Kraków ===
On 9 June 2022, Klimczak moved to III liga side Wieczysta Kraków on a three-year deal. He left the club by mutual consent on 1 September 2023.

=== Chrobry Głogów ===
After spending over five months without a club, on 15 February 2024 Klimczak joined Chrobry Głogów until the end of the season, with a one-year extension option.

=== Olimpia Grudziądz ===
On 29 August 2024, Klimczak re-joined Olimpia Grudziądz, returning to the club after a six-year absence.

=== Stomil Olsztyn ===
On 4 August 2026, Klimczak signed a one-year deal with IV liga Warmia-Masuria side Stomil Olsztyn.

== Honours ==
Wieczysta Kraków

- Polish Cup (Lesser Poland regionals): 2022–23
