= Uniemyśl, West Pomeranian Voivodeship =

Uniemyśl
- Village
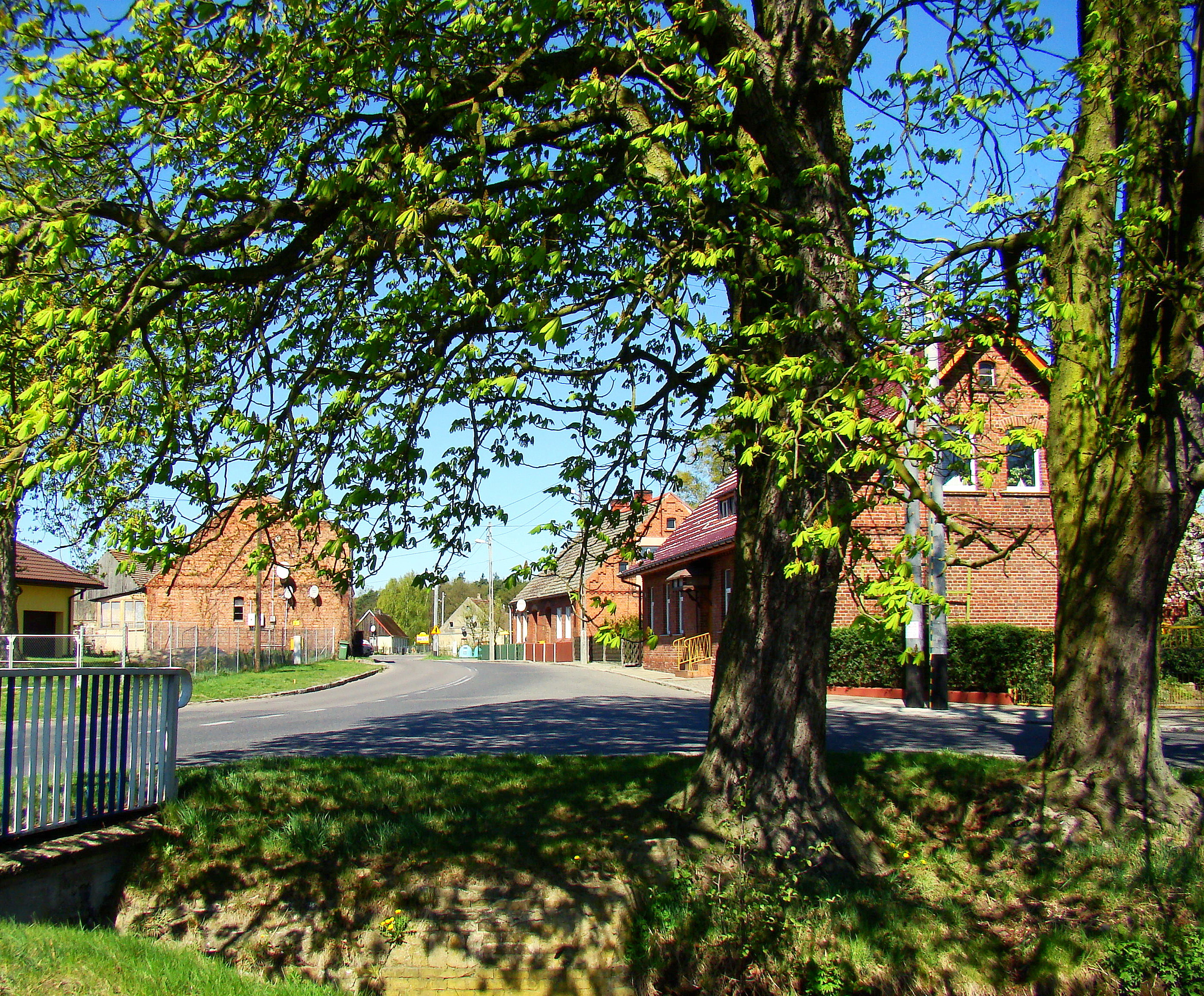
- Uniemyśl, West Pomeranian Voivodeship

- Location within Poland
- Coordinates: 53°37′31″N 14°30′15″E
- Country: Poland
- Voivodeship: West Pomeranian
- County: Police
- Gmina: Police
- Population: 315

Uniemyśl [uˈɲɛmɨɕl] (German: Wilhelmsdorf) is a village in the administrative district of Gmina Police, within Police County, West Pomeranian Voivodeship, in north-western Poland, close to the German border. It lies approximately 12 km (7 mi) north of Police and 24 km (15 mi) north of the regional capital Szczecin.

== History ==
First references to Uniemyśl (Wilhelmsdorf) came from 1760. For the history of the region, see History of Pomerania.

Uniemyśl, known as Wilhelmsdorf to its residents while part of Germany, became part of Poland after the end of World War II and changed its name to the Polish Uniemyśl.

Below is a timeline showing the history of the different administrations that this city has been included in.

Political-administrative membership

- 1815–1866: German Confederation, Kingdom of Prussia, Pomerania
- 1866–1871: North German Confederation, Kingdom of Prussia, Pomerania
- 1871–1918: German Empire, Kingdom of Prussia, Pomerania
- 1919–1933: Weimarer Republik, Free State of Prussia, Pomerania
- 1933–1945: Nazi Germany, Pomerania
- 1945–1946: Enclave Police, (the area reporting to the Red Army)
- 1946–1952: People's Republic of Poland, Szczecin Voivodeship
- 1952–1975: People's Republic of Poland, Szczecin Voivodeship
- 1975–1989: People's Republic of Poland, Szczecin Voivodeship
- 1989–1998: Poland, Szczecin Voivodeship
- 1999 – Current: Poland, Western Pomerania, powiat Police County, Gmina Police

Monuments

- Houses from years 30. and 40. the 20th century
- Railway station from years 30. the 20th century

Demography

- The village has a population:
- 1862 – 162
- 1939 – 501
- 1972 – 400
- 2001 – 315

== Tourism ==
- PTTK path (green footpath Trail of Ornithologists-Szlak Ornitologów) in an area of Uniemyśl in Wkrzanska Forest.
- Bicycle trail (red Trail "Puszcza Wkrzańska"-Szlak "Puszcza Wkrzańska") in an area of Uniemyśl in Wkrzanska Forest.

== See also ==
- Karpina
- Police
- Szczecin
