= Tatynia =

- Village
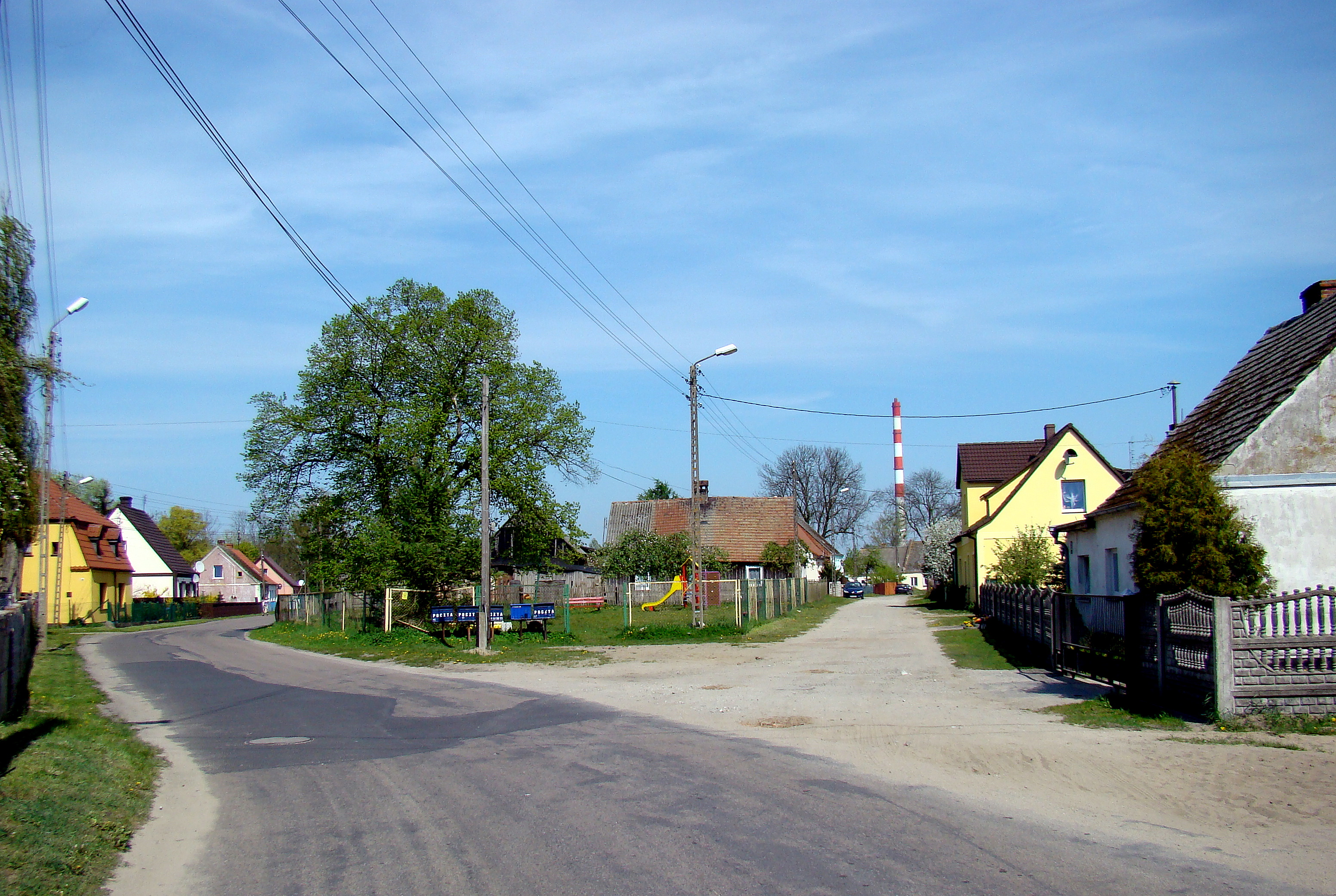
- Tatynia

- Location within Poland
- Coordinates: 53°34′6″N 14°30′33″E
- Country: Poland
- Voivodeship: West Pomeranian
- County: Police
- Gmina: Police
- Population: 250

Tatynia [taˈtɨɲa] (German Hagen) is a village in the administrative district of Gmina Police, within Police County, West Pomeranian Voivodeship, in north-western Poland, close to the German border. It lies approximately 6 km (4 mi) north-west of Police and 18 km (11 mi) north of the regional capital Szczecin.

== History ==
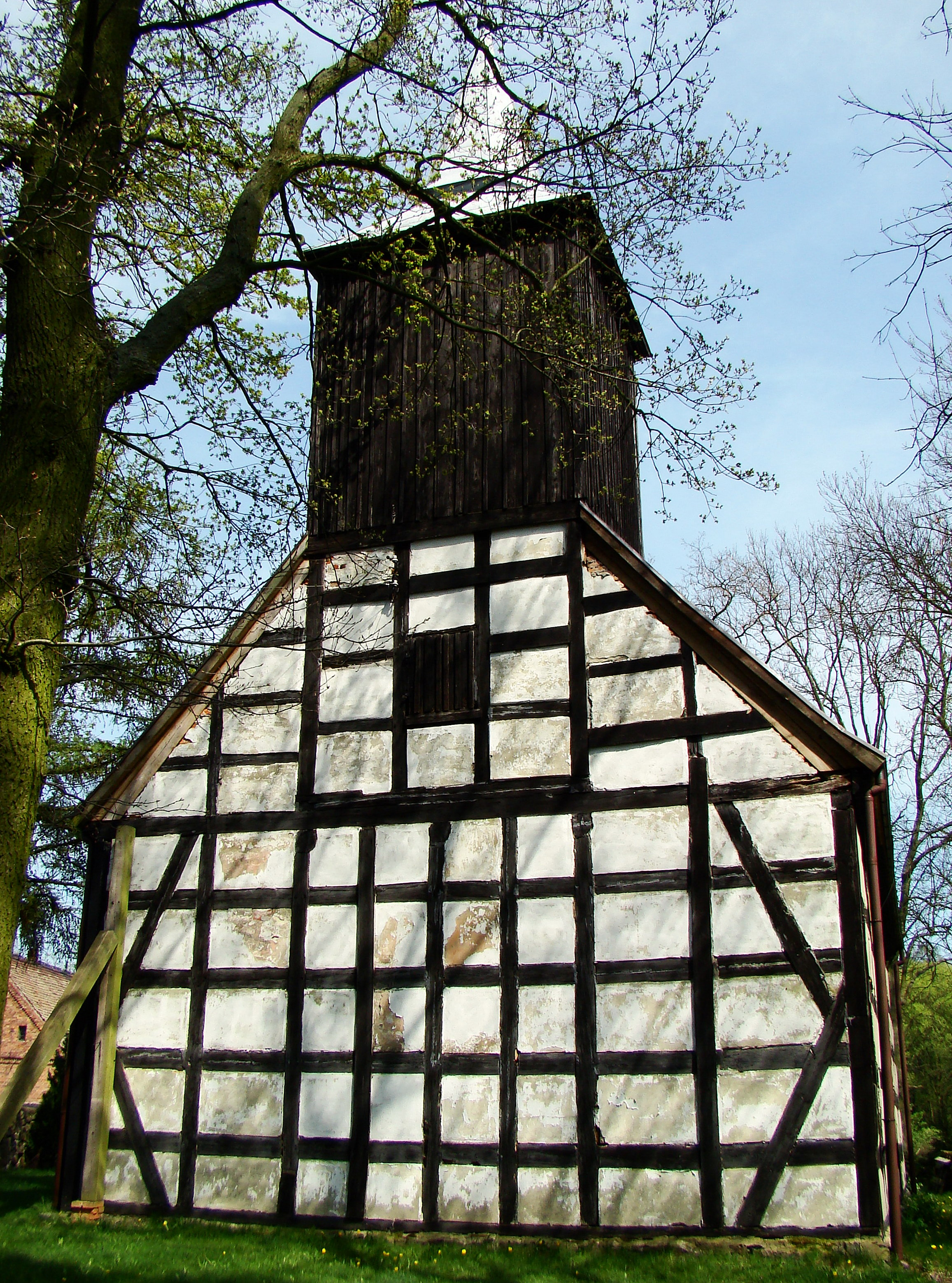
Church in Tatyna

The village of Hagen (then Gobelenhagen) was founded at the turn of the 12th and 13th centuries by Knight Gobello, who was the marshal at the court of Barnim I, Duke of Pomerania. In 1276, at Gobello's request, Duke Barnim I moved the Augustinian Order to Hagen. For the history of the region, see History of Pomerania.

The village has a population of 250.
