= Police, West Pomeranian Voivodeship =

Police
- Town
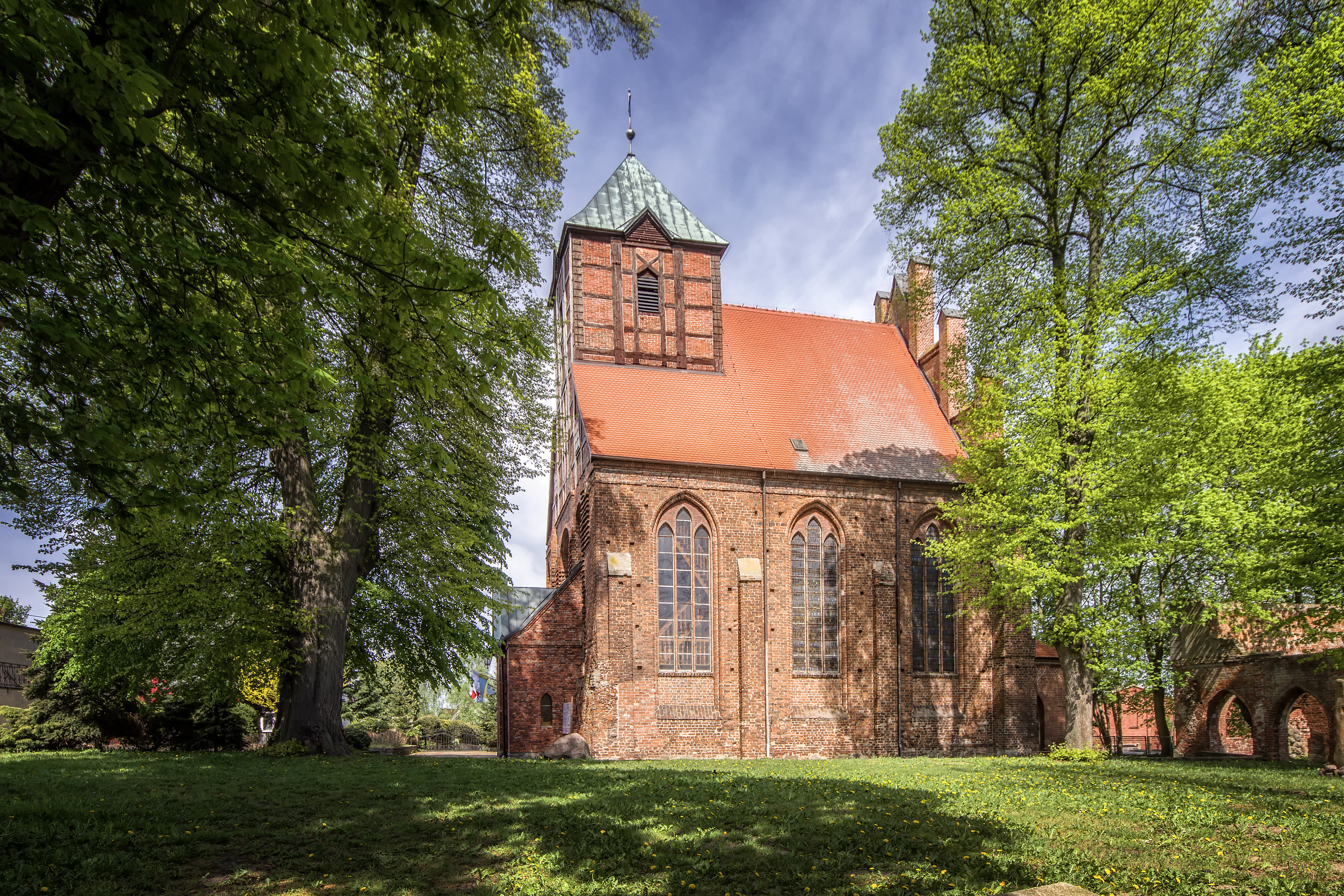
- Saints Peter and Paul Church in Police.

- Flag Coat of arms
- Interactive map of Police
- Location within Poland
- Coordinates: 53°33′09″N 14°34′19″E
- Country: Poland
- Voivodeship: West Pomeranian
- County: Police
- Gmina: Police
- Town rights: 1260

Government
  - Mayor: Krystian Kowalewski

Area
  - Total: 36.84 km^{2} (14.22 sq mi)

Population (2014)
  - Total: 41,745
  - Density: 1,133/km^{2} (2,935/sq mi)
- Time zone: UTC+1 (CET)
  - Summer (DST): UTC+2 (CEST)
- Postal code: 72-009, 72-010, 72-011
- Vehicle registration: ZPL
- Website: www.police.pl

Police (Polish: [pɔˈlit͡sɛ]; German: Pölitz) is a town in the West Pomeranian Voivodeship, in northwestern Poland. It is the capital of Police County and one of the biggest towns of the Szczecin metropolitan area.

The town is situated on the Oder River and its estuary, south of the Szczecin Lagoon and the Bay of Pomerania. The centre of Police is situated about 15 kilometres (9 miles) north of the centre of Szczecin.

== Etymology ==
The name of the town comes from Proto-Slavic pole, which means field.

== History ==
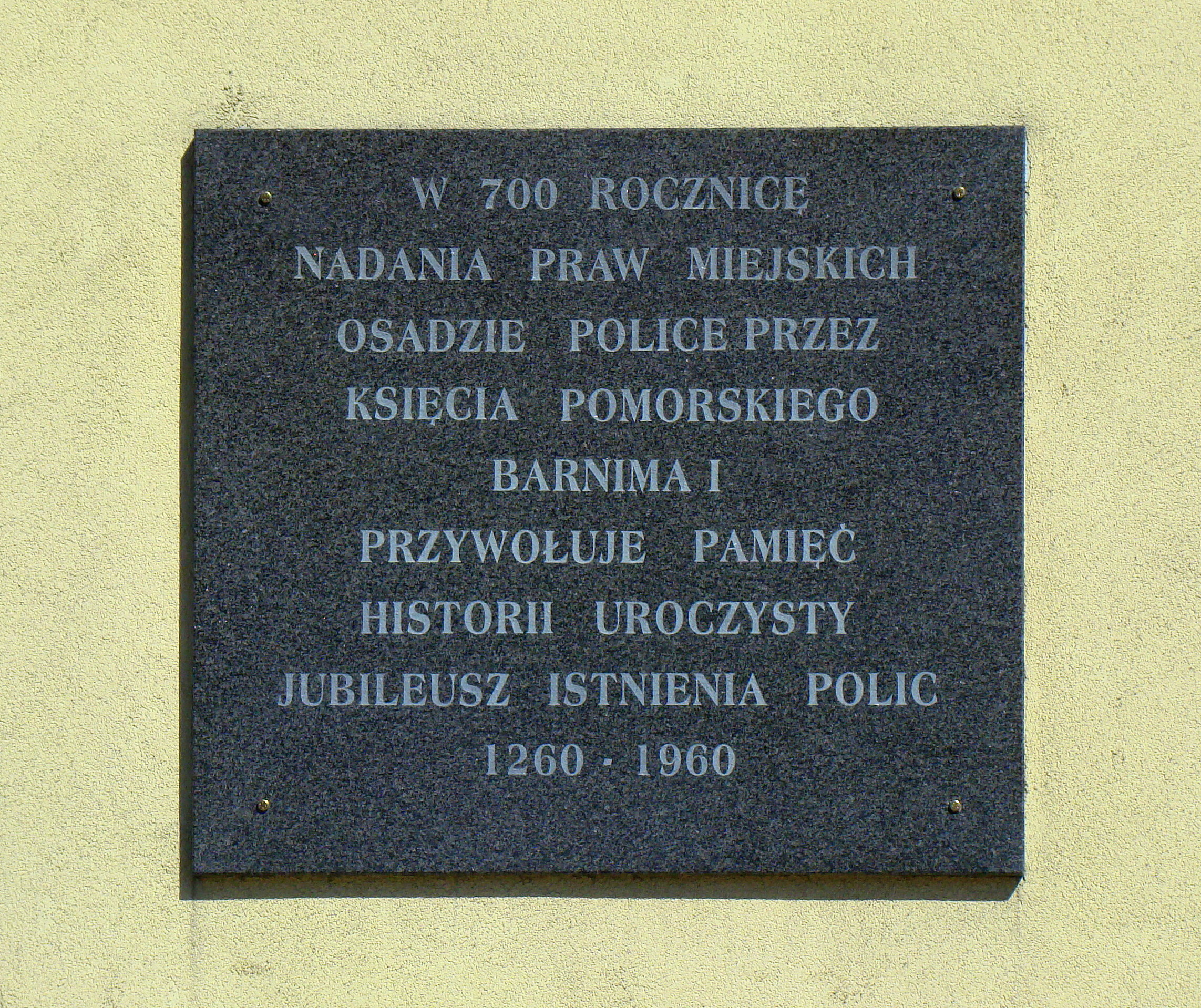
Plaque commemorating the granting of town rights in 1260

The settlement was first mentioned in 1243. Pomeranian duke Barnim of Pomerania granted Magdeburg law to the town in 1260. At the end of the 13th century, the town had become a fief of a local dynasty of knights, the Drake family. In 1321, with the death of Otto Drake, the town became a dependency of nearby Stettin (now Szczecin), hindering its growth until the mid-18th century.

Nearby Jasienica Abbey, now within the Police city limits, was secularized during the Protestant Reformation, which was adapted in the Duchy of Pomerania in 1534. After its secularization, the abbey became a ducal domain, and was the site of the treaty that for the first time partitioned the duchy into a western and eastern part (Pomerania-Wolgast and Pomerania-Stettin) in 1569.

From the Treaty of Stettin (1630) until the Treaty of Stockholm (1720), Pölitz was part of Swedish Pomerania, and of Prussian Pomerania thereafter. In 1808, Pölitz became independent from Stettin again. In 1815, Pölitz became part of the restructured Province of Pomerania, administered within Landkreis Randow county. In 1939, this county was dissolved and Pölitz was made part of Groß-Stettin.

=== German synthetic fuel factory ===
In 1937, the synthetic fuel plant Hydrierwerke Pölitz AG was founded by IG Farben, Rhenania-Ossag, and Deutsch-Amerikanische Petroleum Gesellschaft which by 1943 was producing 15% of Nazi Germany's synthetic fuels, 577,000 tons. The plant derived its workforce from an adjacent system of camps (Pommernlager, Nordlager, Tobruklager, Wullenwever-Lager, Arbeitserziehungslager Hägerwelle, Dürrfeld Lager) plus a ship moored on the Oder River serving as a camp (Umschulungslager Bremerhaven). In addition, a subcamp of the Stutthof concentration camp was located in Pölitz, whose prisoners were mostly Poles, Lithuanians, Latvians, Russians, and Germans, but also Frenchmen, Yugoslavians, and Greeks. Up to 28,000 laborers were placed in all the camps. Exhausting labor, hunger, abuse, and executions resulted in a high death toll in the subcamp of Stutthof, and there were also several escape attempts. The Polish resistance conducted espionage of the local German industry. On 17 April 1945, the prisoners were sent on a death march, whereas the most ill and unable to march were massacred on 25 April 1945.

During World War II, the plant made Pölitz a nine-time bombing target of the Allied Oil Campaign from late April 1943 onward, leading to 70% of the town being destroyed.

=== Post–World War II ===
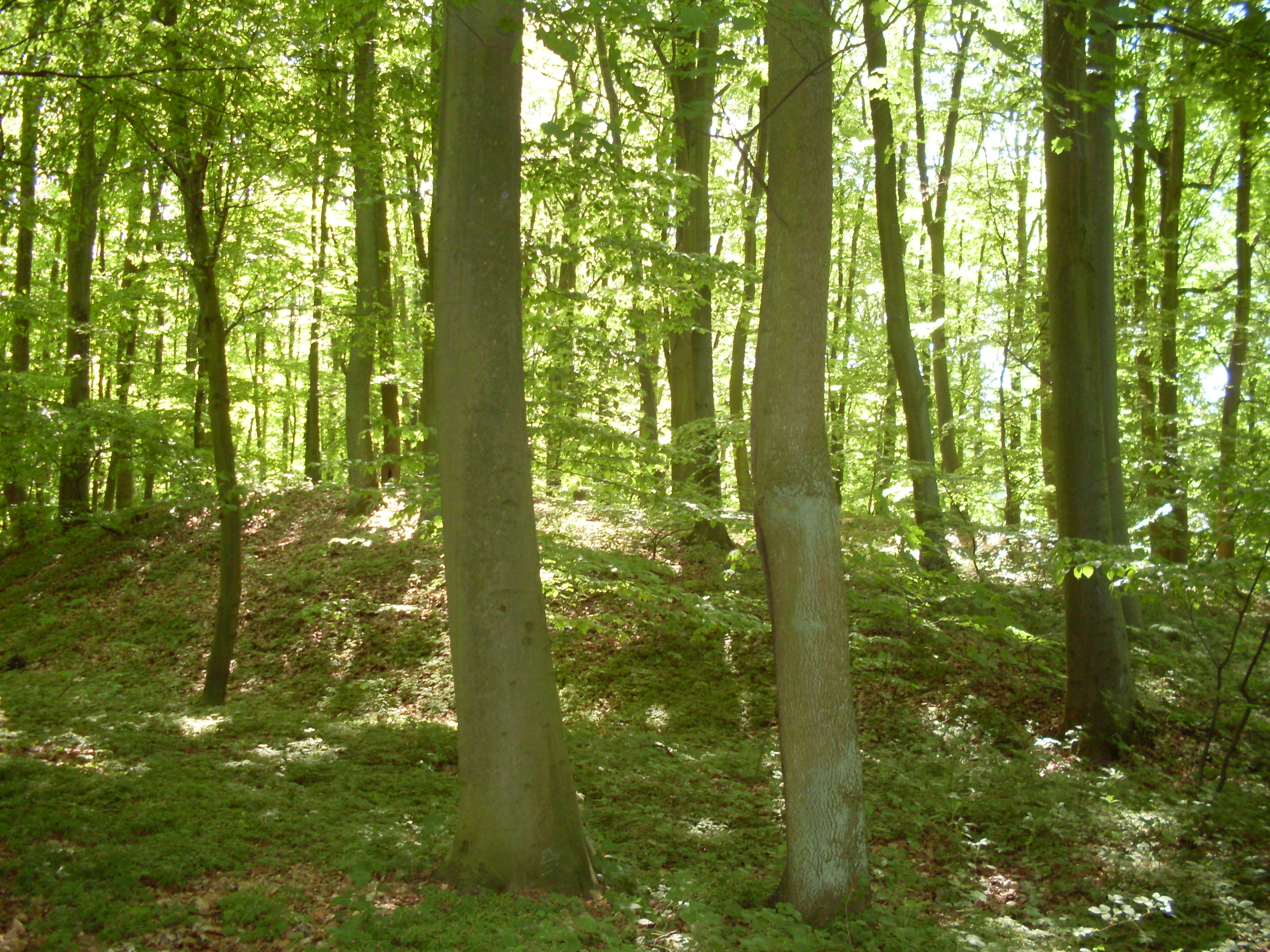
Mścięcino Park near the municipal border between Szczecin and Police

The city with the plant was captured by the Soviet Union's Red Army during the Battle of Berlin on 26 April 1945. While most of the former German territory east of the Oder-Neisse line became Polish, Pölitz, situated on the western bank of the Oder, remained a Soviet-administered exclave: Marshal Zhukov decreed the establishment of a Soviet county with Pölitz, Ziegenort, Jasenitz, Messenthin and Scholwin, although officially also declared part of Poland. 25,000 German workers had to disassemble the plant before it was sent to the USSR.

Gradually, the area without the plant was given to Poland: Mścięcino on 7 September 1946, and Police with Jasienica on 19 September. On 25 February 1947 the plant also passed to Polish control. As a result, the Soviet Union allowed Polish annexations of territory west of the river Odra, beyond the border as agreed on the Potsdam Conference.

Polish settlers, partially expellees from the east of former Poland, arrived in the region to replace the German population that had fled or were expelled. They were joined by refugees from Greece and Yugoslav Macedonia in 1953.

The ruins of the plant still remain standing, though they are not secured and are dangerous to visit.

A large chemical plant (Zakłady Chemiczne "Police") was built in the town in 1969 and has grown since to become one of the largest in Poland. It produces mostly titanium dioxide pigments and nitrogen and phosphorus fertilizers.

Police was in the Szczecin Voivodeship from 1946 to 1998. In 1973, town limits were expanded by including Jasienica as a new district. Since 1999 the town has been part of the West Pomeranian Voivodeship.

== Districts ==
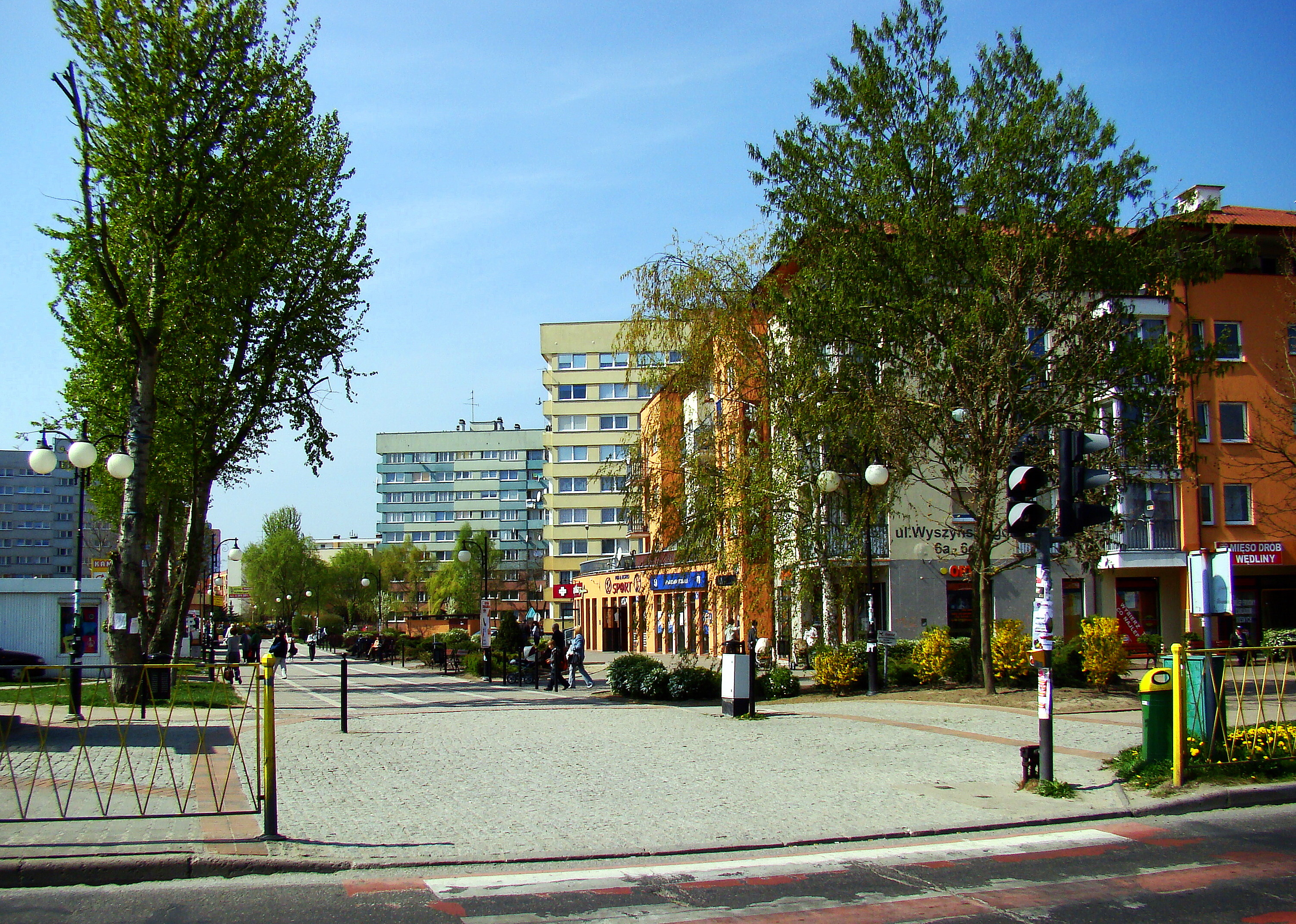
Wyszyńskiego Street in the New Town

- Police Old Town
- Mścięcino
- Jasienica
- New Town (Nowe Miasto: Osiedle Dąbrówka, Osiedle Gryfitów, Osiedle Księcia Bogusława X, Osiedle Anny Jagiellonki)

== Sights ==
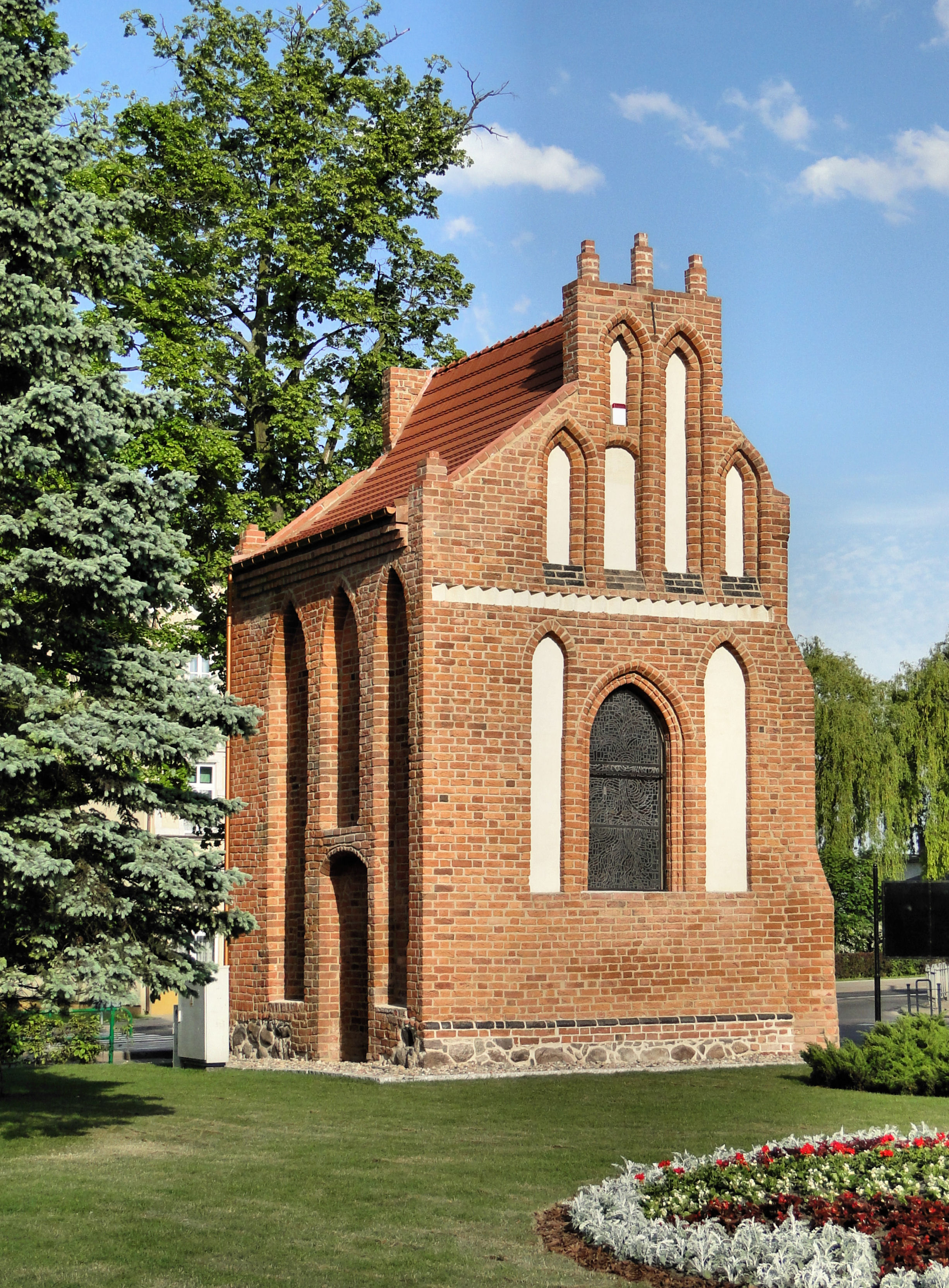
Gothic chapel

Notable buildings from the pre-WW2 era:

- the ruins of Jasienica Abbey, a former Augustinian abbey in Police-Jasienica (14th century)
- a Gothic Church in Police-Jasienica (14th/18th century)
- a Gothic Chapel (15th century) in The Chrobry Square in The Old Town
- a Neo-Gothic Church (19th century) in Old Town
- the Police Lapidary in The Staromiejski Park in Old Town
- Tenement houses (19th century)
- Town hall (1906) (not rebuilt after WWII)

The tourist and cultural information office is localised in The Gothic Chapel in Bolesław Chrobry Square in The Old Town of Police

== Geography and nature ==
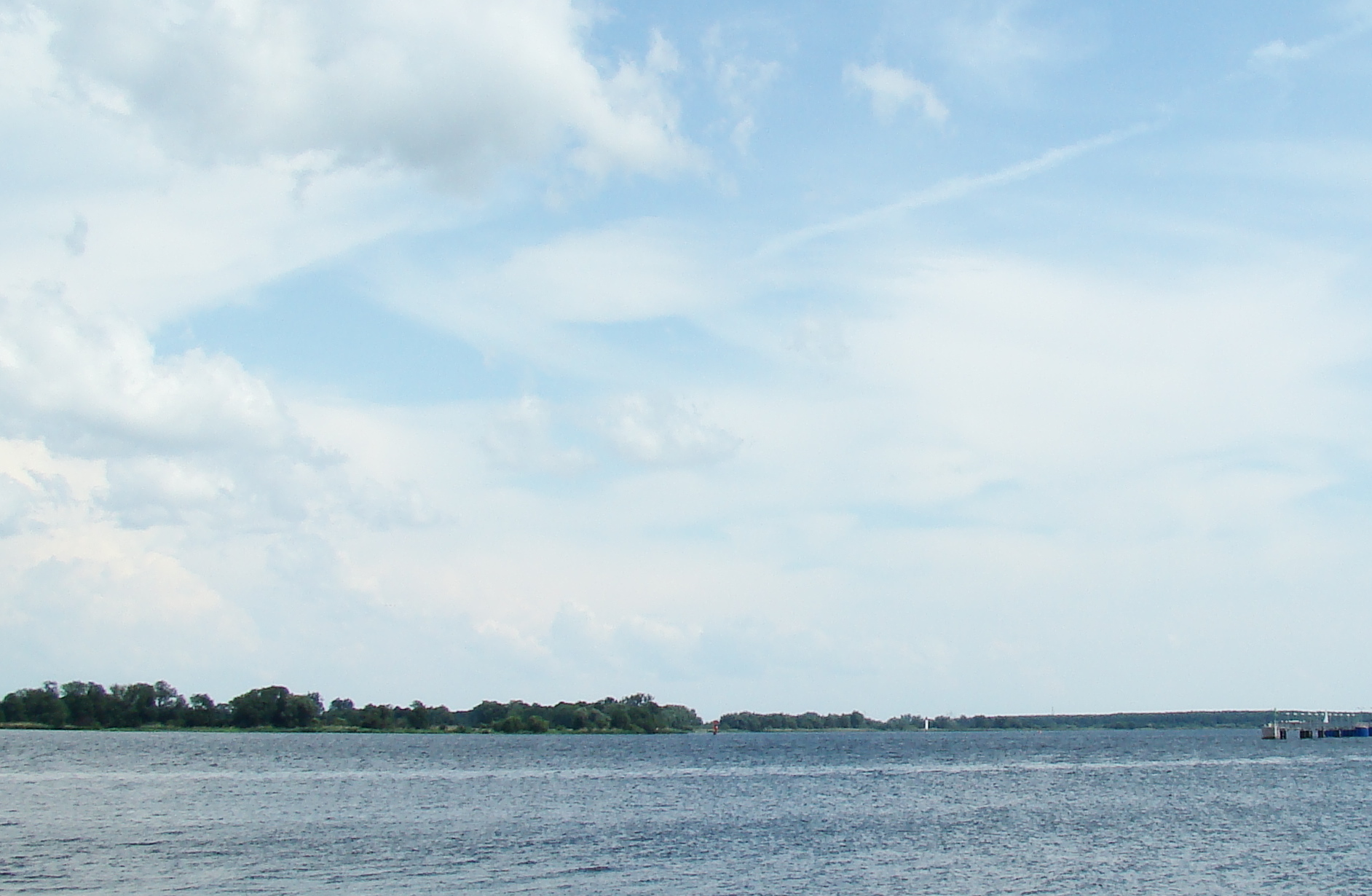
Oder in Police

Police is situated on the Oder River and an estuary of the Oder River - Roztoka Odrzańska, south of the Lagoon of Szczecin and the Bay of Pomerania. The centre of Police Town is situated about 15 km (9 mi) north of the centre of Szczecin. Police is at located in the Ueckermünder Heide (Polish: Puszcza Wkrzańska) with the Świdwie Nature Reserve around Lake Świdwie near Tanowo and Dobra.

A kayak route follows the Gunica River from Węgornik through Tanowo, Tatynia and Wieńkowo to Police-Jasienica. At the Szczecin Lagoon is a small yacht marina on the mouth of the Łarpia River (part of Oder) - 'Olimpia'. The ruins of the synthetic petrol plant (Hydrierwerke Pölitz – Aktiengeselschaft) are now a habitat of bats (Barbastelle, Greater mouse-eared bat, Daubenton's Bat, Natterer's bat, Brown long-eared bat).

== Population ==
Historical population

Year	Pop.	±%
1740	1,000	—
1816	1,313	+31.3%
1850	2,500	+90.4%
1871	3,871	+54.8%
1880	4,146	+7.1%
1890	4,009	−3.3%

Year	Pop.	±%
1900	4,415	+10.1%
1910	4,149	−6.0%
1925	4,963	+19.6%
1939	6,323	+27.4%
1960	8,894	+40.7%
1970	12,800	+43.9%

Year	Pop.	±%
1980	24,800	+93.8%
1990	34,400	+38.7%
2000	35,000	+1.7%
2010	33,951	−3.0%
2023	36,232	+6.7%

== Infrastructure ==
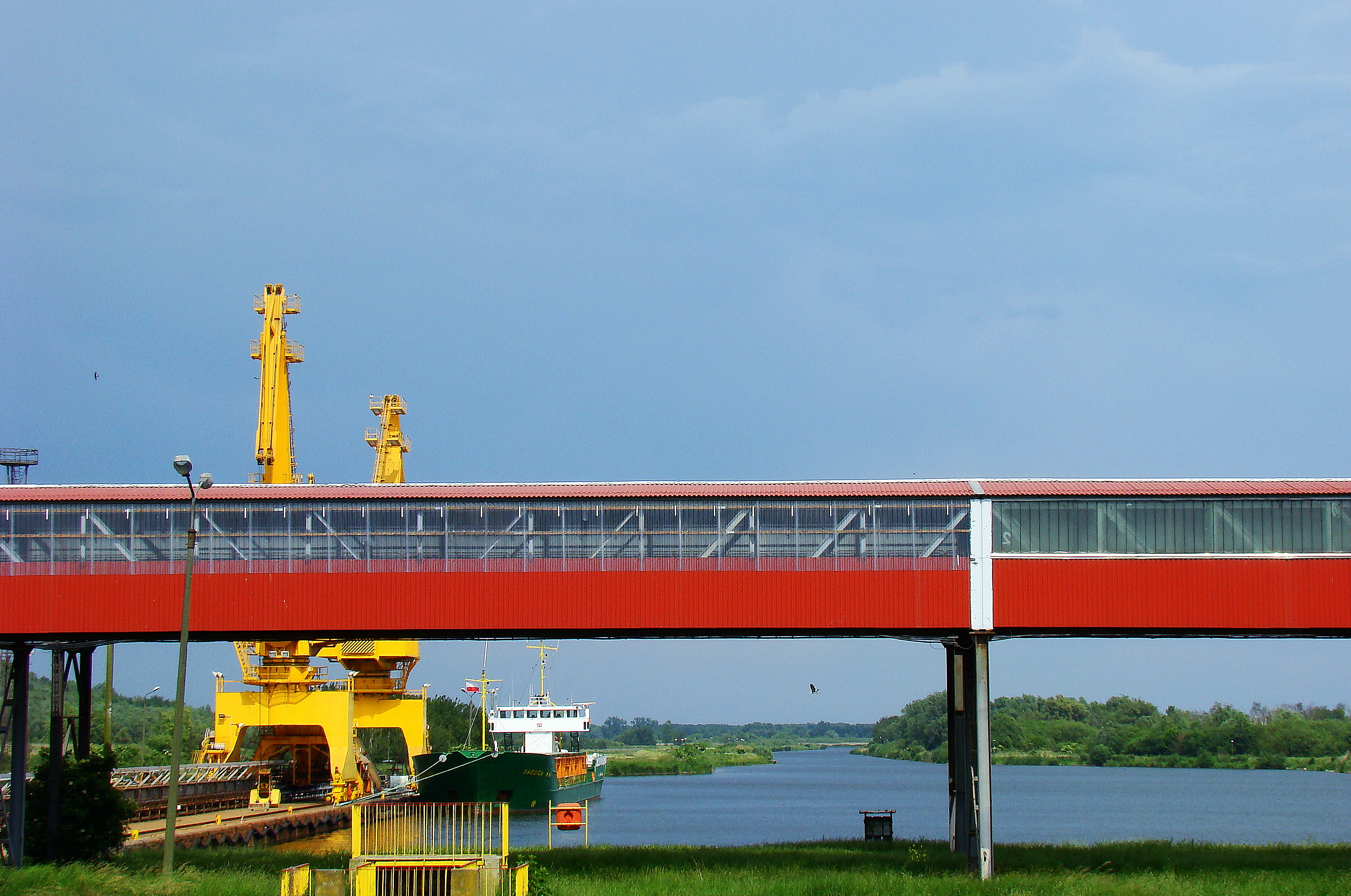
Port of Police

Major roads under state control connect Police to Trzebież and Nowe Warpno, No. 114; to Tanowo, No. 114; and to Szczecin over Przęsocin.

Main streets in Police include: ul. Tanowska, ul. Bankowa, ul. Grunwaldzka, ul. Kościuszki, ul. Jasienicka, ul. Dworcowa, ul. Piastów, ul. Wojska Polskiego, ul. Asfaltowa, ul. Cisowa, ul. Piłsudskiego, and ul. Wyszyńskiego.

- Railway:

- Szczecin - Police - Trzebież

- Harbours:

- Port of Police: Sea-Harbour
- Port of Police: River-Harbour

- Airport in Goleniów, a town behind the Oder River (Szczecin-Goleniów "Solidarność" Airport)
- Public transport:
  - 10 bus lines in a town. Bus communication between all districts of a town, a few villages near Police (Trzeszczyn, Tanowo, Siedlice, Leśno Górne, Pilchowo, Przęsocin, LS to Trzebież over Dębostrów, Niekłończyca and Uniemyśl) and Szczecin City.
- Taxicab

== Culture and sport ==
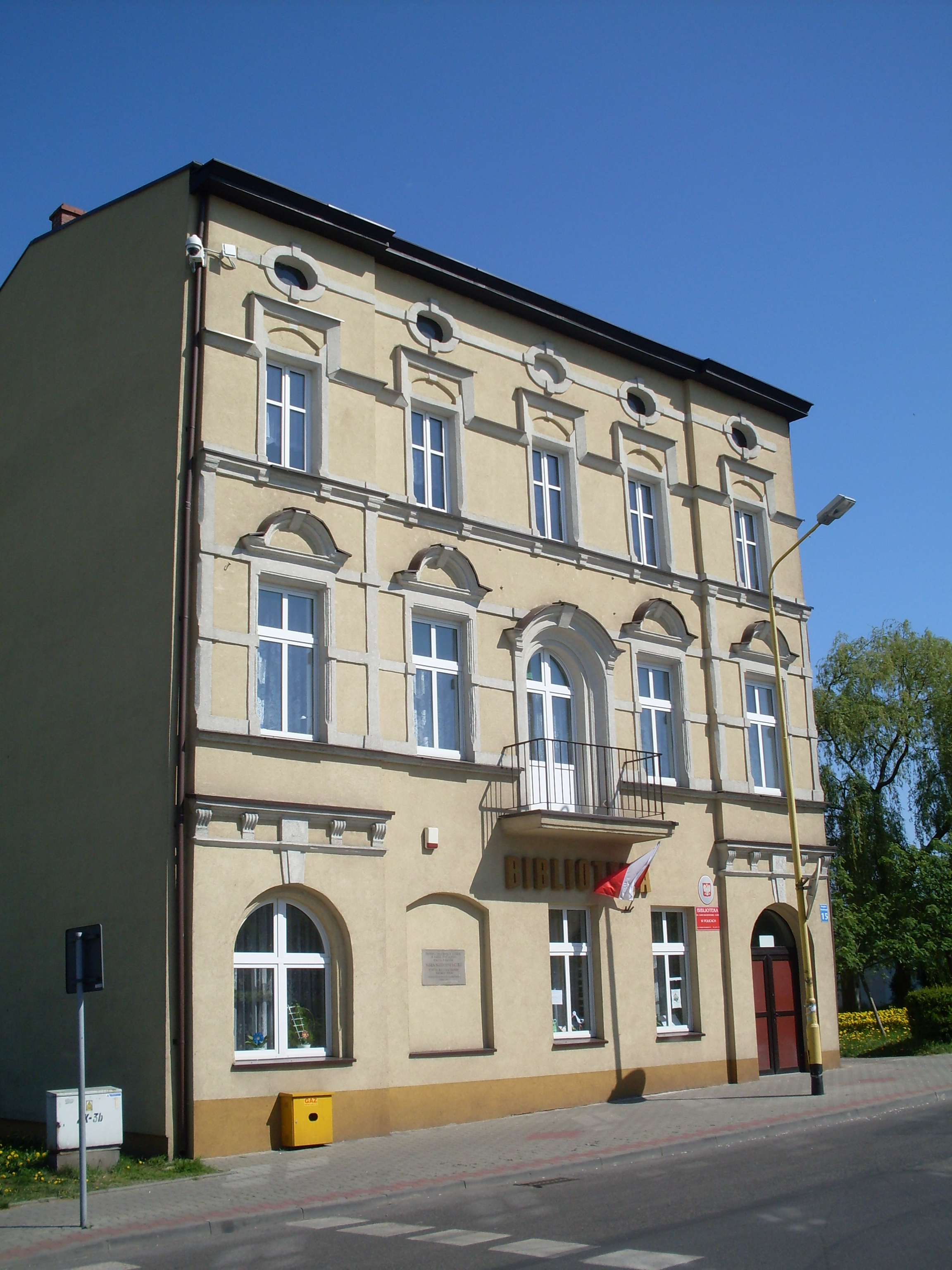
Public Library of Police County in Police

- Chemik Police - football club
- KPS Chemik Police - female volleyball club
- Łarpia Sail Festival - shanty music festival - in May, periodic
- Augustinian Fair (Polish: Jarmark Augustiański) in Jasienica - at the end of August, periodic
- Police Nationwide Quarter-Marathon (Ćwierćmaraton Policki) - in October, periodic
- Police Music Days (Polish: Polickie Dni Muzyki "Cecyliada") - in October, periodic

== Hospital ==
A clinic hospital in Police (Siedlecka Street, The New Town, Osiedle Gryfitów) is a part of The Pomeranian Medical University.

== Notable people ==
- Ludwig Hollonius (1570s-1621), pastor and playwright
- Adrian Klimczak (born 1997), Polish footballer
- Hans Modrow (1928–2023), former premier of East Germany
- Jan Pawłowicz (born 1960), Polish athlete, Olympic participant
- Kacper Smoliński (born 2001), Polish footballer
- Aleksander Doba (born 1946), Adventurer

== Major corporations ==
- Zakłady Chemiczne Police SA
- Port of Police (The Seaport, The Barge Port, The 'Mijanka' cargo berth)
- Industrial Park - Policki Park Przemysłowy (Infrapark Police)

== Twinning cities ==
The sister cities of Police are:

- Pasewalk, Germany
- Novyi Rozdil, Ukraine
- Slagelse, Denmark

== Towns near Police ==
- Szczecin, Poland
- Nowe Warpno, Poland
- Goleniów, Poland
- Eggesin, Germany
- Ueckermünde, Germany
- Pasewalk, Germany

== See also ==
- Villages in Police County: Przęsocin, Kołbaskowo, Trzebież
- Szczecin Lagoon
- Wkrzanska Forest
