= Port of Police =

Seaport in Poland

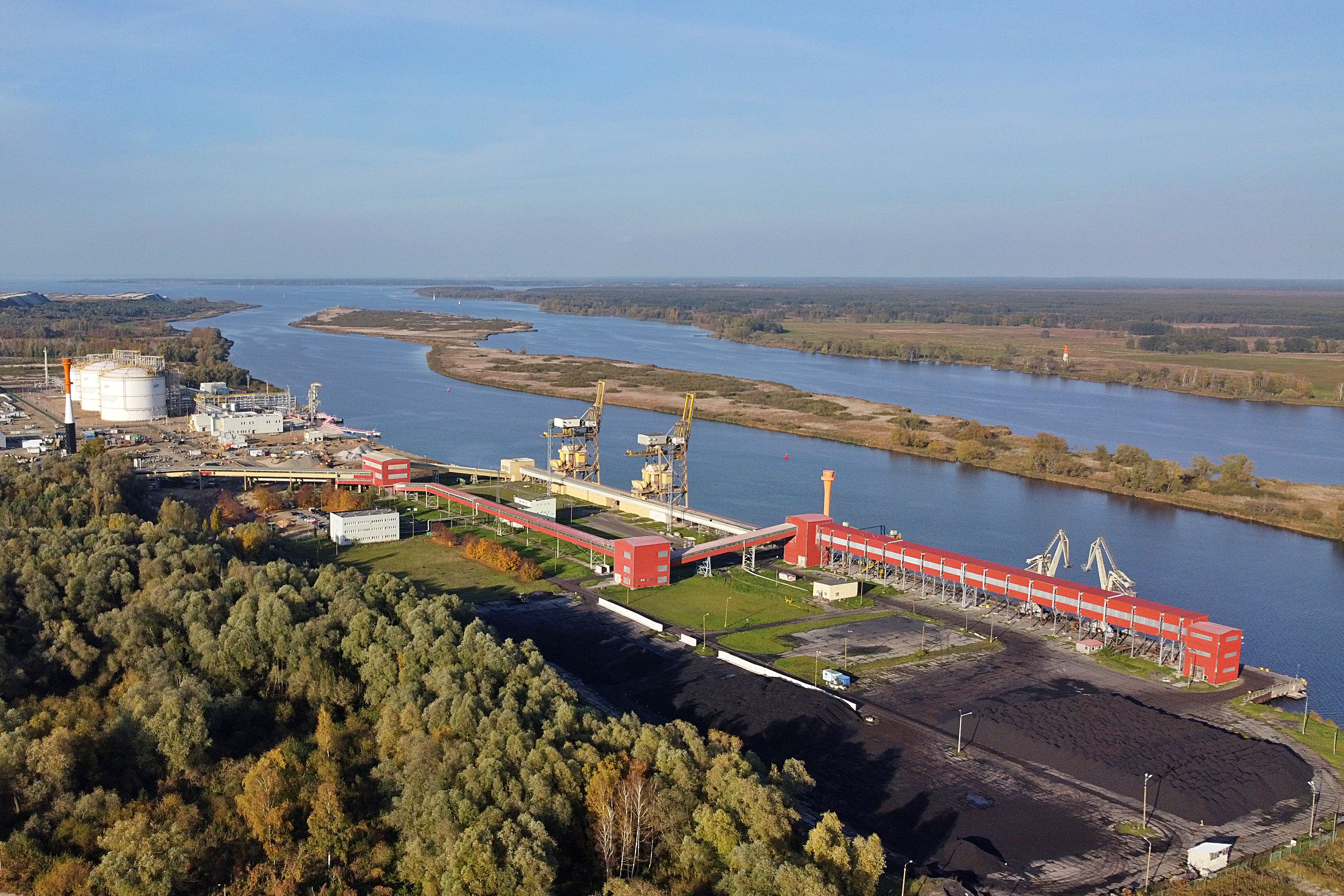
- The Sea Terminal in the Port of Police (2022)
- Interactive map of Port of Police

Location
- Country: Poland
- Location: Police
- Coordinates: 53°33′08″N 14°36′03″E
- UN/LOCODE: PLC

Details
- Draft depth: 9,15 m

Statistics
- Vessel arrivals: 227
- Annual cargo tonnage: 1,212,000 (2022)
- Annual container volume: 116 (2021)
- Passenger traffic: 10 (2022)
- Website; Port of Police

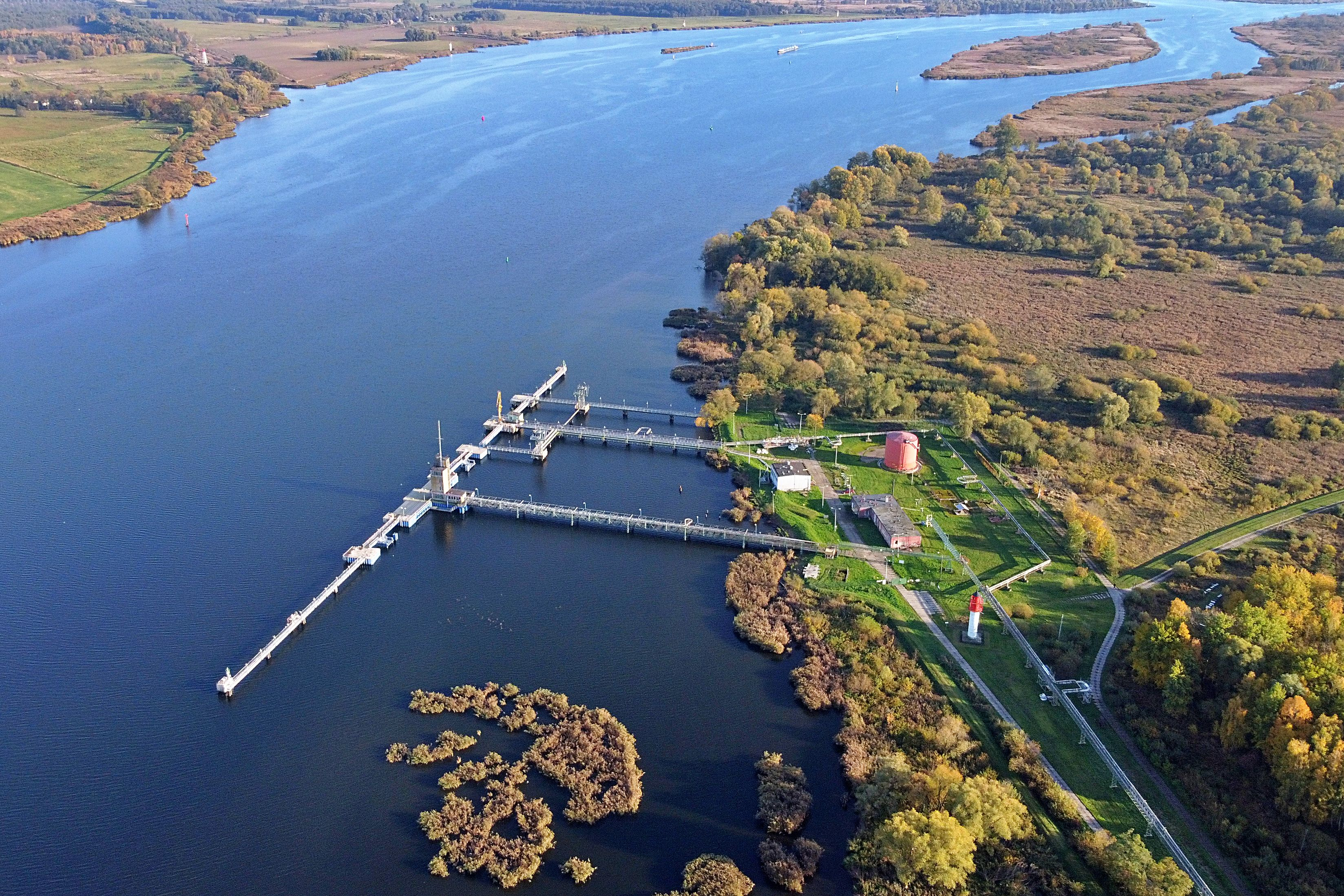
The Mijanka Terminal in the Port of Police (2022)

The Port of Police (Polish pronunciation: [pɔˈlit͡sɛ]; in Polish generally Port Police) is a Polish seaport and deep water harbour in Police, Poland located on the west bank of the Oder River, off the Szczecin Lagoon. It is the fourth-busiest port in the country.

In 2022, the cargo traffic in the seaport equaled 1,212,000 tons, comprising 1% of all cargo traffic in Polish seaports and the port was entered by 227 ships with gross tonnage of more than 100.

In January 2019 Port of Police and PKP have signed an agreement to create a direct railway link with the port to improve the delivery of the cargo. A direct track with accompanying infrastructure will be constructed from Police railway station to the seaport itself.

The Port of Police has access to the Baltic Sea through the Szczecin Lagoon, Świna strait.

== See also ==
- Ports of the Baltic Sea
