= Nowe Warpno (disambiguation) =

Nowe Warpno is a town in Poland.

Nowe Warpno may also refer to:

- Gmina Nowe Warpno
- Nowe Warpno Bay
- Nowe Warpno Lake
- Nowe Warpno Peninsula
- Nowe Warpno Seaport
