= Haffboot =

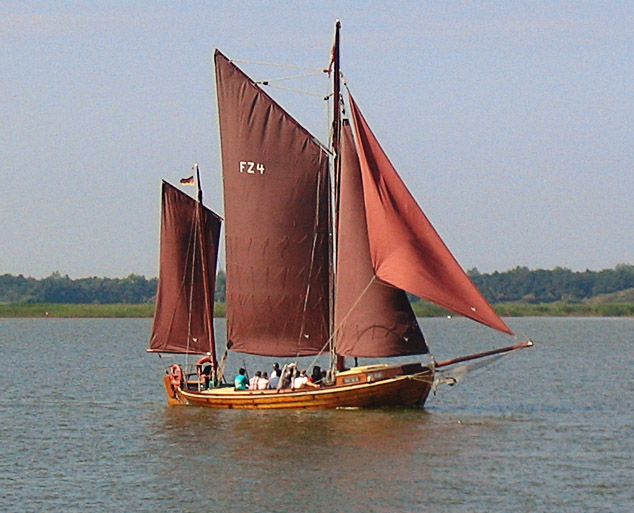
A zeesenboot

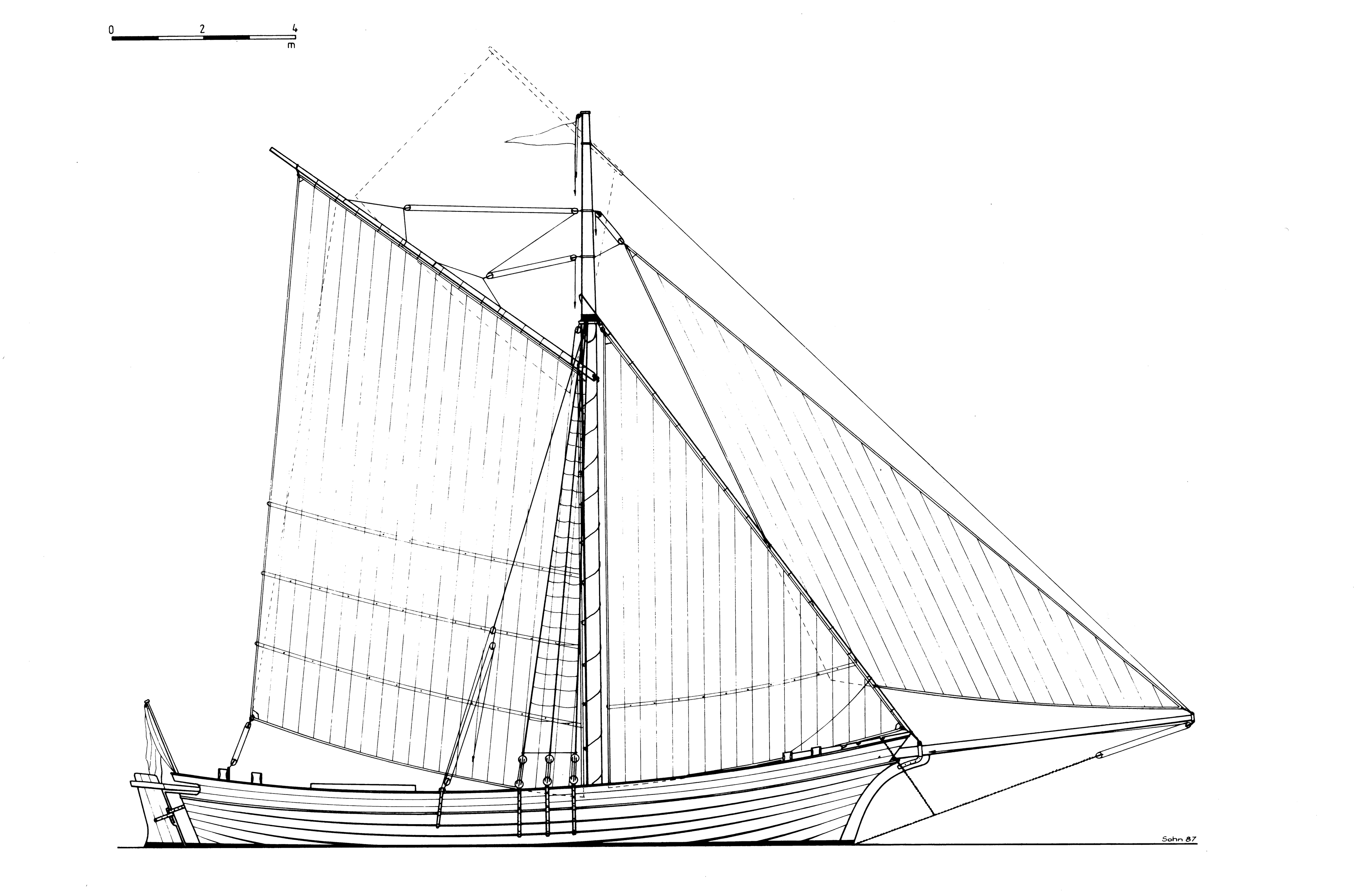
Sketch of a 1918 quatze

A Haffboot (plural: Haffboote) is the collective term for a type of sailing boat that is used as a fishing or cargo boat on the shallow Baltic Sea coast, in the Bay of Greifswald, the Stettin Lagoon and their neighbouring waterbodies until the 20th century. Using similar or identical designs for the ship's hull and its cargo hold, the fishing boats were built with wet or dry cargo holds. The flushed cargo hold, often called a Bünn in the Baltic Sea region, is not sealed hermetically from the water, but is filled with surrounding water. Small holes in the outer skin of the boat enable an exchange of water between the bünn and the outside water. The fish that are caught can thus be transported live. In a traditional fishing boat without cooling units, this allowed the time delay between catching the fish and landing them to be extended. Around the turn of the 19th and 20th centuries, haffboote were active on the Neuwarper See and in the lower Oder delta. They were built as shallow-draughted, broad-beamed clinker built vessels at small boatyards in Neuwarp (now Nowe Warpno), Anklam or Ueckermünde.

== Types ==
The following types were classified as haffboote on the Stettin Lagoon: the zeeskahn, once the largest of the haffboote. It was 22 metres long, wide beamed and had a shallow draught. Its crew usually consisted of 3 men. Zeeskähne were usually under way for 48 hours and fished at night. Other types were the tuckerkahn, the polte, the zolle and the quatze. The haul was handed over to fish dealers (Quatzner). They went out regularly to the fishing zeeskähne and tuckerkähne in order to bring in the catch and take it to the markets. At the same time they supplied the fishermen with provisions and news.

== See also ==
- Kurenkahn

== Literature ==
- Wolfgang Rudolph: Die Insel der Schiffer. Rostock, 2000, ISBN 3-356-00855-2.
- Alfred Dudszus, Ernest Henriot, Friedrich Krumrey: Das große Schiffstypenbuch. Schiffe–Boote–Flöße unter Riemen und Segel. Historische Schiffs- und Bootsfunde. Berühmte Segelschiffe. transpress, Berlin, 1983.
