= Myślibórz Wielki =

- Village
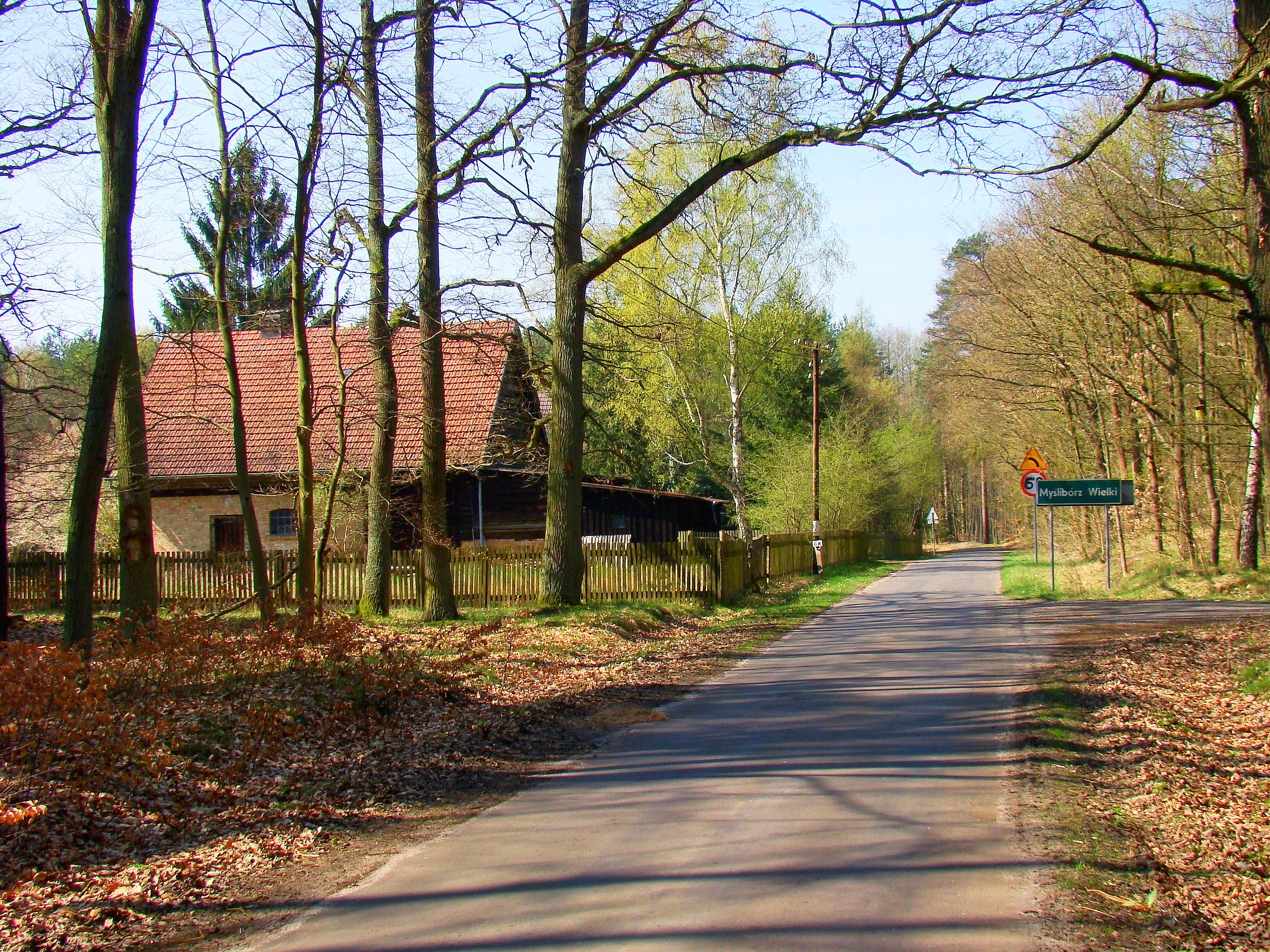

- Location within Poland
- Coordinates: 53°38′43″N 14°17′58″E
- Country: Poland
- Voivodeship: West Pomeranian
- County: Police
- Gmina: Nowe Warpno

Myślibórz Wielki (Polish pronunciation: [mɨˈɕlibuʐ ˈvjɛlkʲi]; German: Groß Mützelburg) is a village in the administrative district of Gmina Nowe Warpno, within Police County, West Pomeranian Voivodeship, in north-western Poland, close to the German border. It lies approximately 9 km (6 mi) south of Nowe Warpno, 22 km (14 mi) north-west of Police, and 32 km (20 mi) north-west of the regional capital Szczecin.

For the history of the region, see History of Pomerania.
