= Trzebieradz, Police County =

Trzebieradz
- Settlement
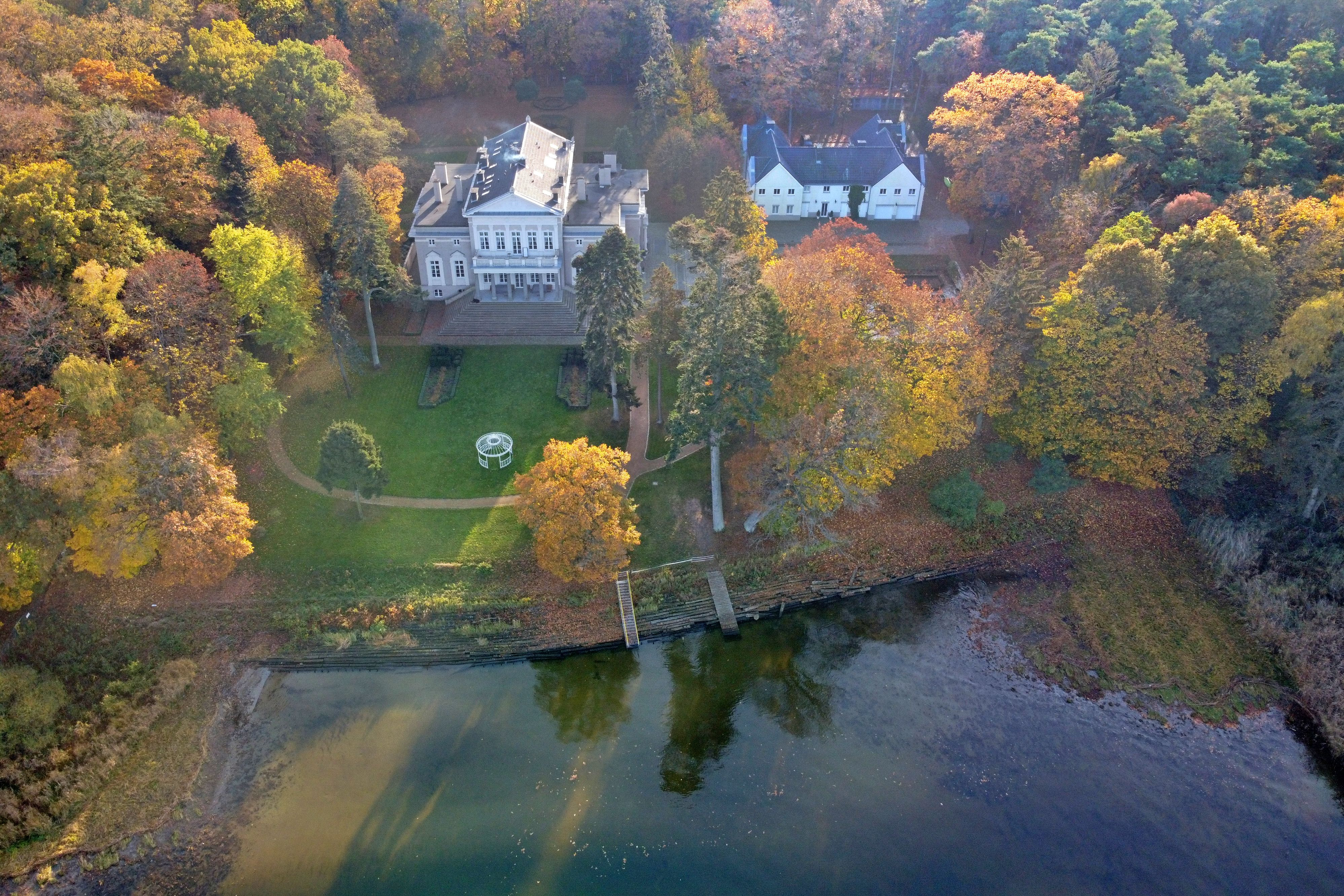
- Manowce Palace after renovation in 2022

- Location within Poland
- Coordinates: 53°40′N 14°24′E
- Country: Poland
- Voivodeship: West Pomeranian
- County: Police
- Gmina: Nowe Warpno

Trzebieradz [tʂɛˈbjɛrat͡s] (German: Horst Försterei) is a settlement in the administrative district of Gmina Nowe Warpno, within Police County, West Pomeranian Voivodeship, in north-western Poland, close to the German border. It lies approximately 11 km (7 mi) south-east of Nowe Warpno, 19 km (12 mi) north-west of Police, and 31 km (19 mi) north-west of the regional capital Szczecin.

For the history of the region, see History of Pomerania.
