= Warnołęka =

- Village
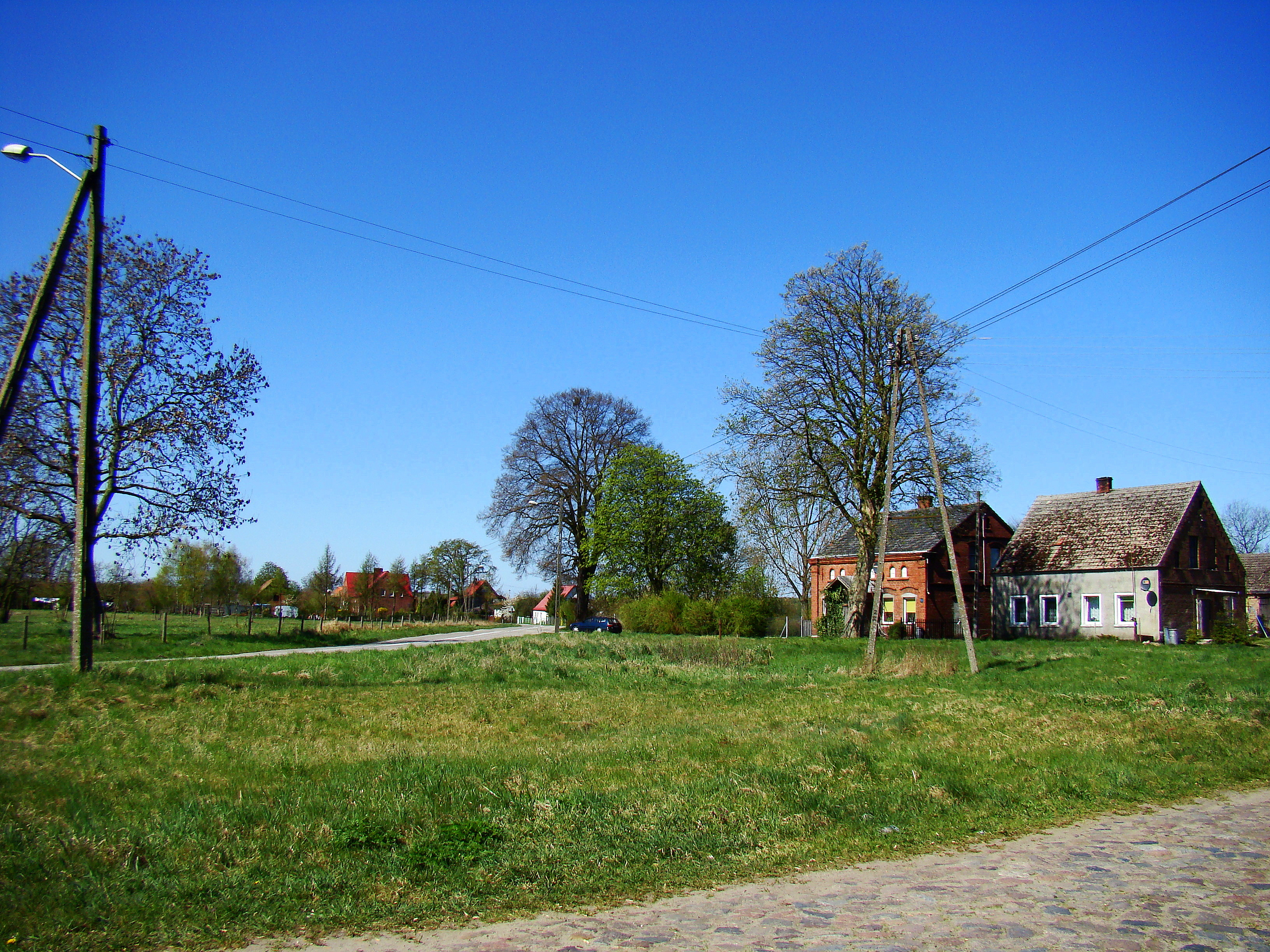
- Warnołęka

- Location within Poland
- Coordinates: 53°41′42″N 14°21′47″E
- Country: Poland
- Voivodeship: West Pomeranian
- County: Police
- Gmina: Nowe Warpno
- Population: 160

Warnołęka [varnɔˈwɛnka] (German: Wahrlang) is a village in the administrative district of Gmina Nowe Warpno, within Police County, West Pomeranian Voivodeship, in northwestern Poland, close to the German border. It lies approximately 7 km (4 mi) east of Nowe Warpno, 23 km (14 mi) northwest of Police, and 35 km (22 mi) northwest of the regional capital Szczecin.

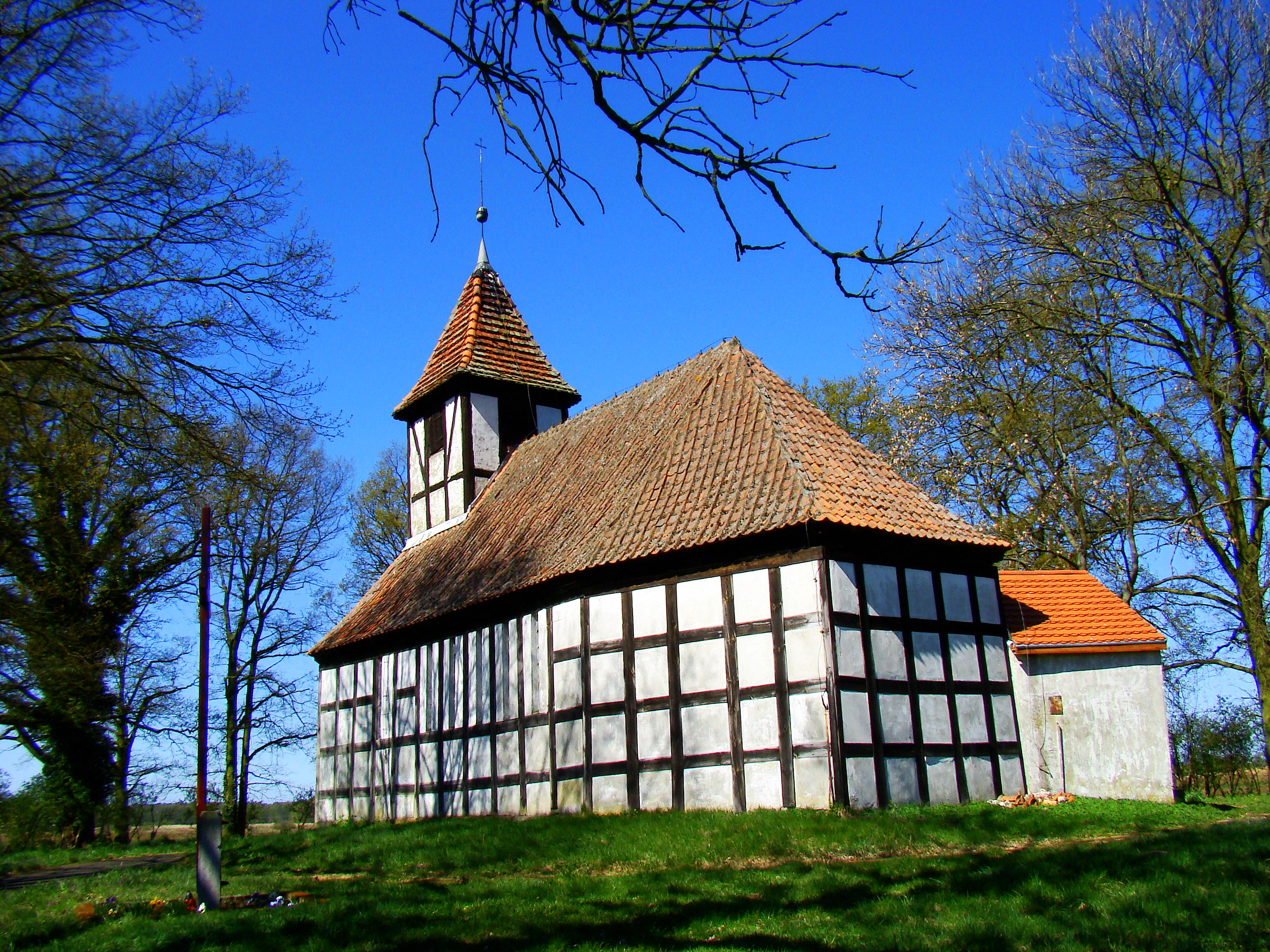
Our Lady of Częstochowa Church in Warnołęka
