= Myślibórz Mały =

- Village
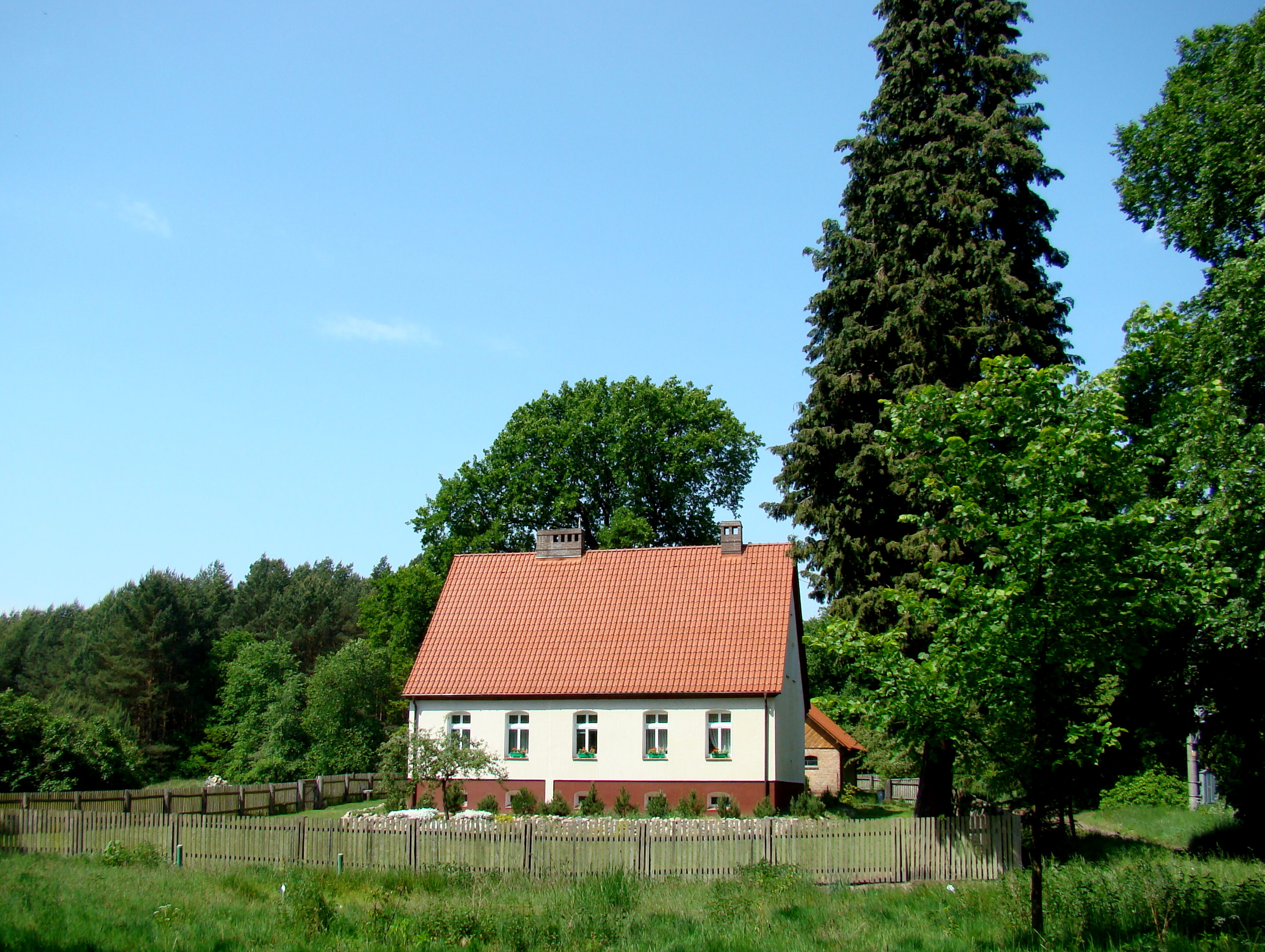
- House in the village

- Location within Poland
- Coordinates: 53°39′43″N 14°17′16″E
- Country: Poland
- Voivodeship: West Pomeranian
- County: Police
- Gmina: Nowe Warpno
- Population: 4

Myślibórz Mały [mɨˈɕlibuʂ ˈmawɨ] (German: Klein Mützelburg) is a village in the administrative district of Gmina Nowe Warpno, within Police County, West Pomeranian Voivodeship, in north-western Poland, close to the German border. It lies approximately 7 km (4 mi) south of Nowe Warpno, 24 km (15 mi) north-west of Police, and 34 km (21 mi) north-west of the regional capital Szczecin.

For the history of the region, see History of Pomerania.

The village has a population of 4.
