= Maszkowo, Police County =

Maszkowo
- Settlement
- Location within Poland
- Coordinates: 53°39′2″N 14°17′35″E
- Country: Poland
- Voivodeship: West Pomeranian
- County: Police
- Gmina: Nowe Warpno

Maszkowo [maʂˈkɔvɔ] (German: Moritzhof) is a settlement in the administrative district of Gmina Nowe Warpno, within Police County, West Pomeranian Voivodeship, in north-western Poland, close to the German border. It lies approximately 8 km (5 mi) south of Nowe Warpno, 23 km (14 mi) north-west of Police, and 33 km (21 mi) north-west of the regional capital Szczecin.

For the history of the region, see History of Pomerania.
