= Zeesenboot =

Wide-hulled sailing boat

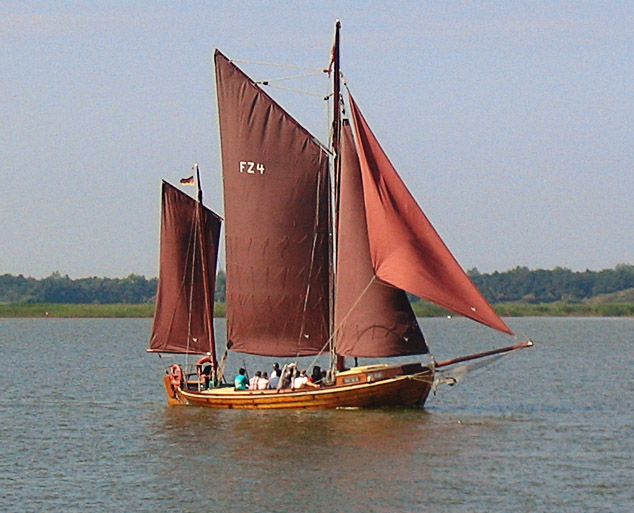
A zeesenboot

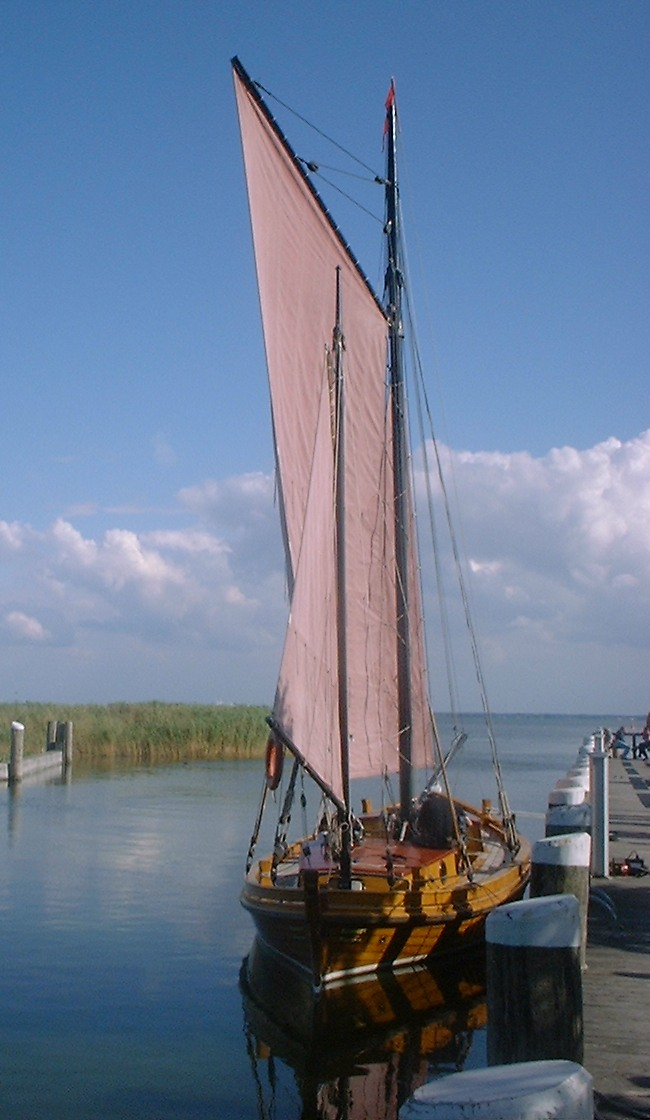
The zeesboot Sannert in Ahrenshoop-Althagen harbour

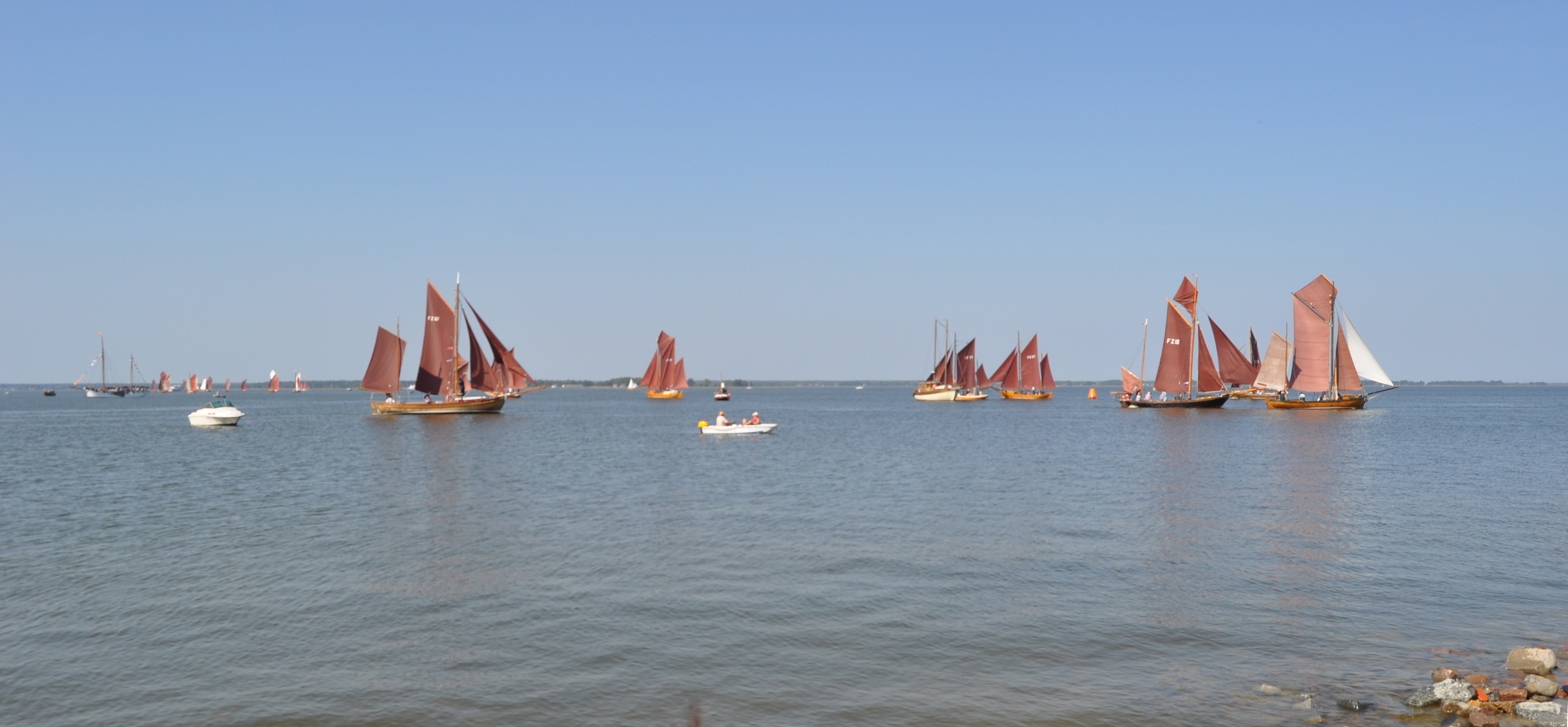
50th Zeesenboot Regatta in Bodstedt

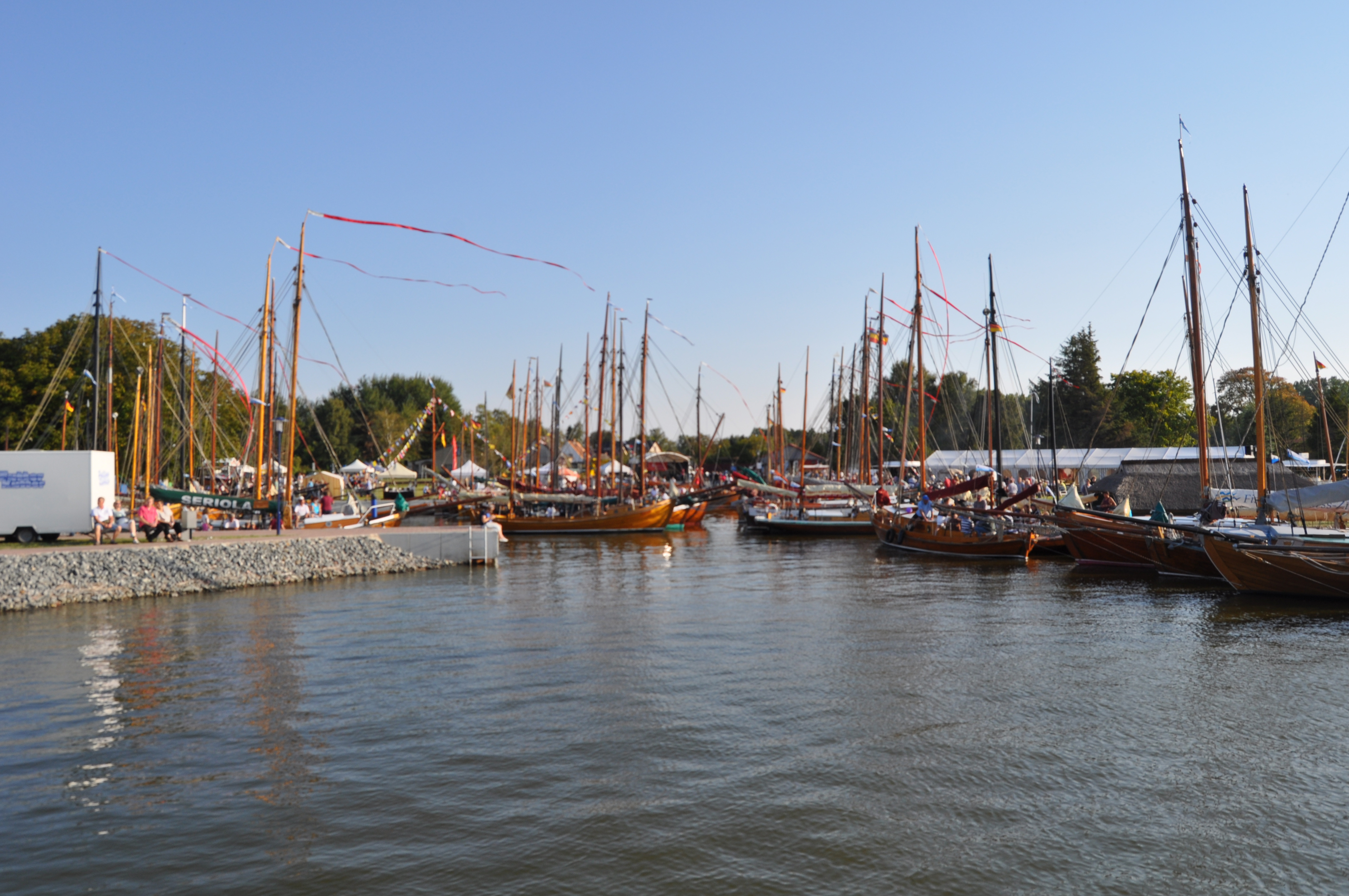
The boats in the harbour after the regatta with participants' pennants on the masts

A Zeesenboot (plural Zeesenboote), in plattdeutsch Zeesboot (pl: Zeesboote) or Zeeskahn (pl.: Zeeskähne), is a usually 10-metre-long, wide-hulled sailing boat of a type known as a Haffboot. The name is derived from the type of fishing gear used, known as a zeese. The sailing boat is designed for relatively protected, shallow waters. Today zeesenboote are mainly used for leisure sailing.

== History ==
Zeeskähne were being used no later than end of the 15th century as fishing vessels, especially in the area of the Pomeranian bodden and the Stettin Lagoon. In the Stralsund Chronicle of 1449 Johannes Beckmann writes of Zesekahn.

The technical development of the Zeesboot from the Western Pomeranian Zeesekahn was encouraged from the second half of the 19th century because many Zeesen fishermen had travelled abroad by sea in their youth and had been able to become familiar with the sailing practices of other regions.

For example, after 1880 Danish influences saw the use of a centreboard, fitted into a trunk in the middle of the boat. Previously a sideboard had been used, which was always attached to leeward side of the boat. Its carvel construction became common in the second half of the 19th century; Hitherto clinker construction had been usual.

Originally the zeesenboote were small, single-masted boats with a square rigged sail. With the increasing size of zeesenboote in the early 19th century, the square rig gave way to a lug sail. From about 1870, the fore-and-aft rig was introduced (gaff rigged). Towards the end of the 19th century, a second mast became common which also carried a lugsail. The rig of the zeesenboote at this time is the one used today on those boats that are still sailing.

In the 19th century and early 20th century in the Stettin Lagoon, there were even Zeeskähne up to 22 metres long; however they fell victim to a 1908 regulation.

Fishing with zeesenboote was still practised in East Germany until the end of the 1970s. Occasionally former zeesboote are used today as small motorised cutters by bodden fishermen.

There are very many zeesenboote today on the bodden waters behind the Fischland-Darß-Zingst peninsula. These boats are maintained and preserved by their owners. They are used as private sailing boats or for sailing excursions by tourists.

In 1909, the first regatta took place, with 10 zeesenboote. Annual competitions have been held since 1964. For example, on the Bodstedter Bodden on 6 September, 2014, the 50th Zeesenboot Regatta took place (see illustration), after the new harbour complex had been opened that afternoon in Bodstedt. Fifty four boats took part in the regatta.

== See also ==
- Aak
- Kurenkahn

== Literature ==
- Andreas Dietzel, Ernst U Krohn, René Legrand: Zeesenboote im National Park. 1994 ISBN 3-9803999-0-7
- Hermann Winkler: Zeesboote. Hinstorff, 1986
- Wolfgang Rudolph: Segelboote der deutschen Ostseeküste. Akademieverlag, 1969
