= Brzózki, West Pomeranian Voivodeship =

Brzózki
- Village
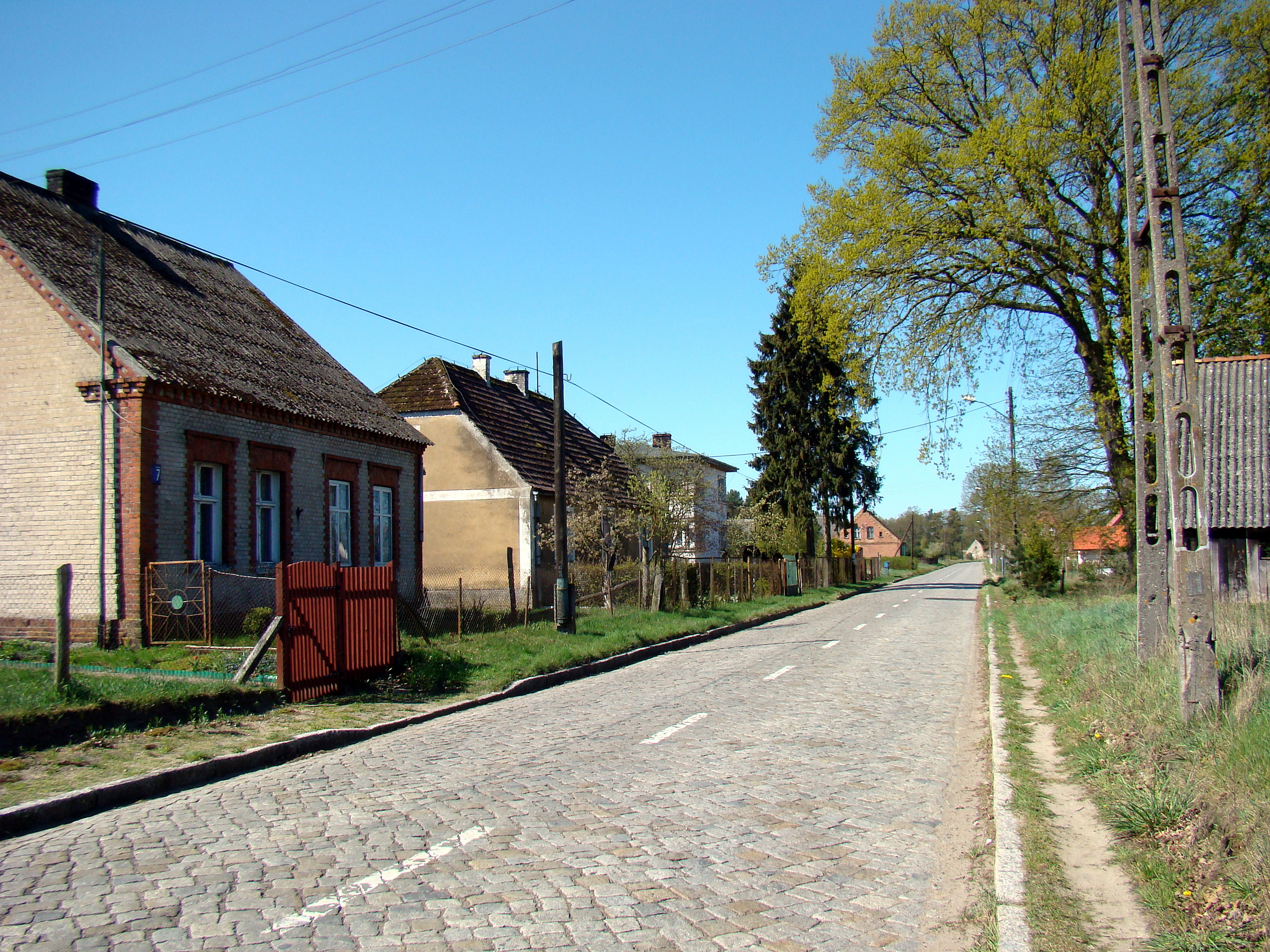

- Location within Poland
- Coordinates: 53°40′31″N 14°22′54″E
- Country: Poland
- Voivodeship: West Pomeranian
- County: Police
- Gmina: Nowe Warpno
- Population: 160

Brzózki [ˈbʐuski] (German: Althagen) is a village in the administrative district of Gmina Nowe Warpno, within Police County, West Pomeranian Voivodeship, in north-western Poland, close to the German border. It lies approximately 9 km (6 mi) south-east of Nowe Warpno, 20 km (12 mi) north-west of Police, and 32 km (20 mi) north-west of the regional capital Szczecin.
