= Mszczuje =

- Village
- Location within Poland
- Coordinates: 53°40′26″N 14°20′29″E
- Country: Poland
- Voivodeship: West Pomeranian
- County: Police
- Gmina: Nowe Warpno
- Population: 19

Mszczuje [ˈmʂt͡ʂujɛ] (German: Moorbrück) is a village in the administrative district of Gmina Nowe Warpno, within Police County, West Pomeranian Voivodeship, in north-western Poland, close to the German border. It lies approximately 7 km (4 mi) south-east of Nowe Warpno, 22 km (14 mi) north-west of Police, and 33 km (21 mi) north-west of the regional capital Szczecin.

For the history of the region, see History of Pomerania.

The village has a population of 19.
