= Luckow, Mecklenburg-Vorpommern =

- Municipality
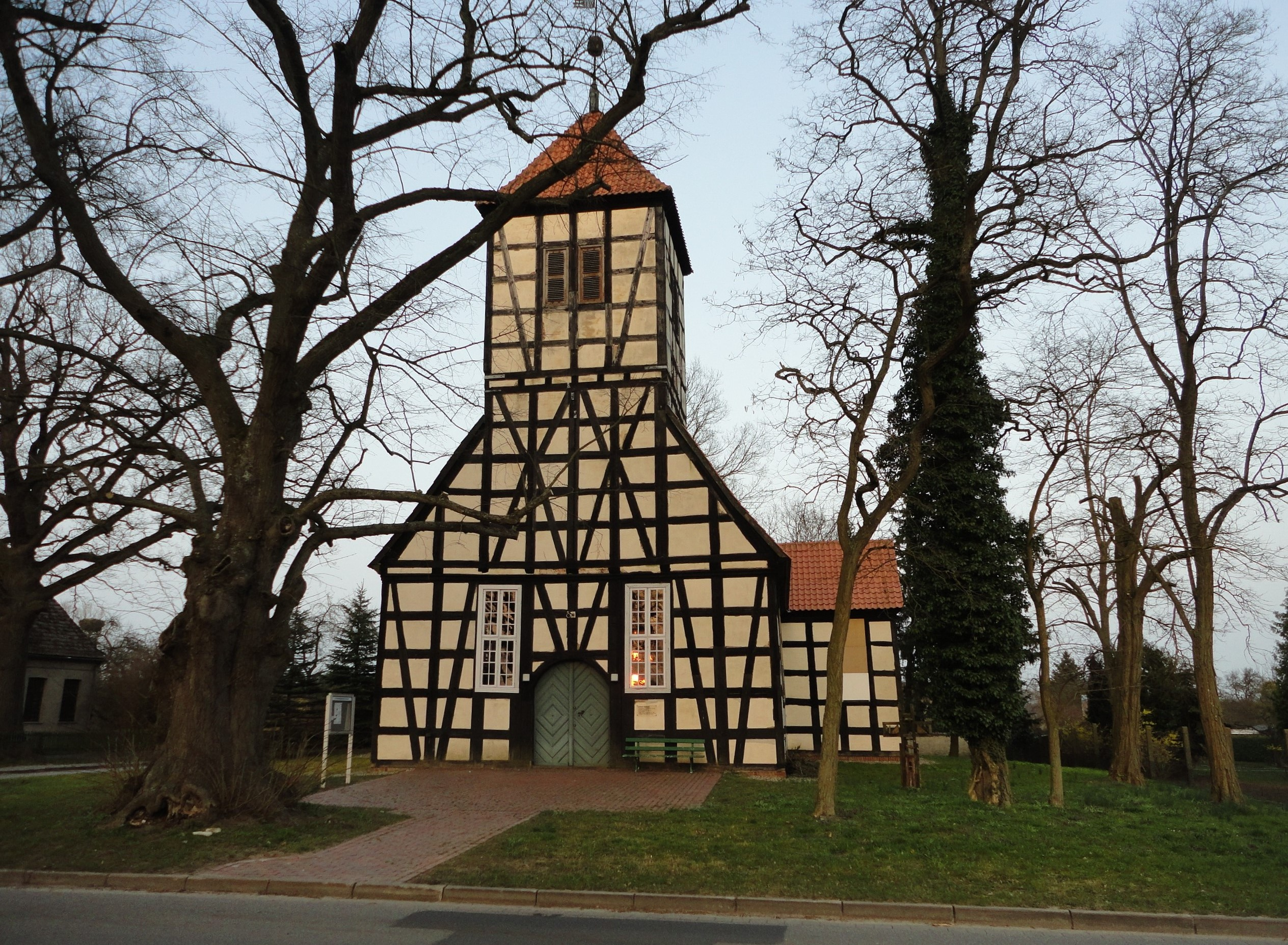
- Timber framed church

- Location of Luckow, Mecklenburg-Vorpommern within Vorpommern-Greifswald district
- Interactive map of Luckow, Mecklenburg-Vorpommern
- Location within Germany Location within Mecklenburg-Vorpommern
- Coordinates: 53°41′N 14°09′E
- Country: Germany
- State: Mecklenburg-Vorpommern
- District: Vorpommern-Greifswald
- Municipal assoc.: Am Stettiner Haff

Government
  - Mayor: Ursula Krüger

Area
  - Total: 37.57 km^{2} (14.51 sq mi)
- Elevation: 10 m (33 ft)

Population (2025-12-31)
  - Total: 511
  - Density: 13.6/km^{2} (35.2/sq mi)
- Time zone: UTC+01:00 (CET)
  - Summer (DST): UTC+02:00 (CEST)
- Postal codes: 17375
- Dialling codes: 039775
- Vehicle registration: VG
- Website: www.amt-am-stettiner-haff.de

Luckow is a municipality in the Vorpommern-Greifswald district, in Mecklenburg-Vorpommern, Germany. The municipality is administered by the office Am Stettiner Haff with seat in Eggesin.

== Districts ==
- Luckow
- Christiansberg
- Fraudenhorst
- Rieth
- Riether Stiege
- Island Riether Werder in the bay Neuwarper See

== History ==
The southern shore and the hinterland of the Szczecin Lagoon were inhabited thousands of years ago, as evidenced by spearheads and fist wedges. The area belonged to the Duchy of Pomerania, then to Swedish Pomerania from 1648 to 1720. Luckow was part of the Prussian Province of Pomerania from 1720 to 1945, of the State of Mecklenburg-Vorpommern from 1945 to 1952, of the East German Bezirk Neubrandenburg from 1952 to 1990 and since 1990, again of Mecklenburg-Vorpommern.

Luckow was a Slavic complex. In 1260 it was mentioned as Luckowe (in German: Wiesengrund) in a deed of transfer. The timber-framed church in Luckow was built in 1726. Luckow was owned by the von Bröcker and Muckerwitz family until 1782.

Christiansberg was founded in 1822 and settled by day labourers. The botanical garden was established in 1982 and comprises a collection of plants from all over the world. Deciduous trees, conifers and magnolias as well as more than 300 rhododendron plants, a shrub area, a heath garden and a rock garden can be found here.

Fraudenhorst: Near Fraudenhorst stands one of the oldest groups of yews in Germany. The trees are between 500 and 800 years old. Luckow: The half-timbered church in Luckow was built in 1726. Luckow was owned by the von Bröcker and Muckerwitz family until 1782.

Mönkeberg was founded by monks from Ueckermünde in 1290.

Rieth was first mentioned in a document in 1252. From 1317 to 1648 and again from 1690 to the 18th century the estate was in the possession of the family Bröker. The church was built after 1648. The manor house, built for the von Bülow family, dates from 1841. The village was an independent municipality until 31 December 1997.
