= Riether Werder =

Island in the Nowe Warpno Lake

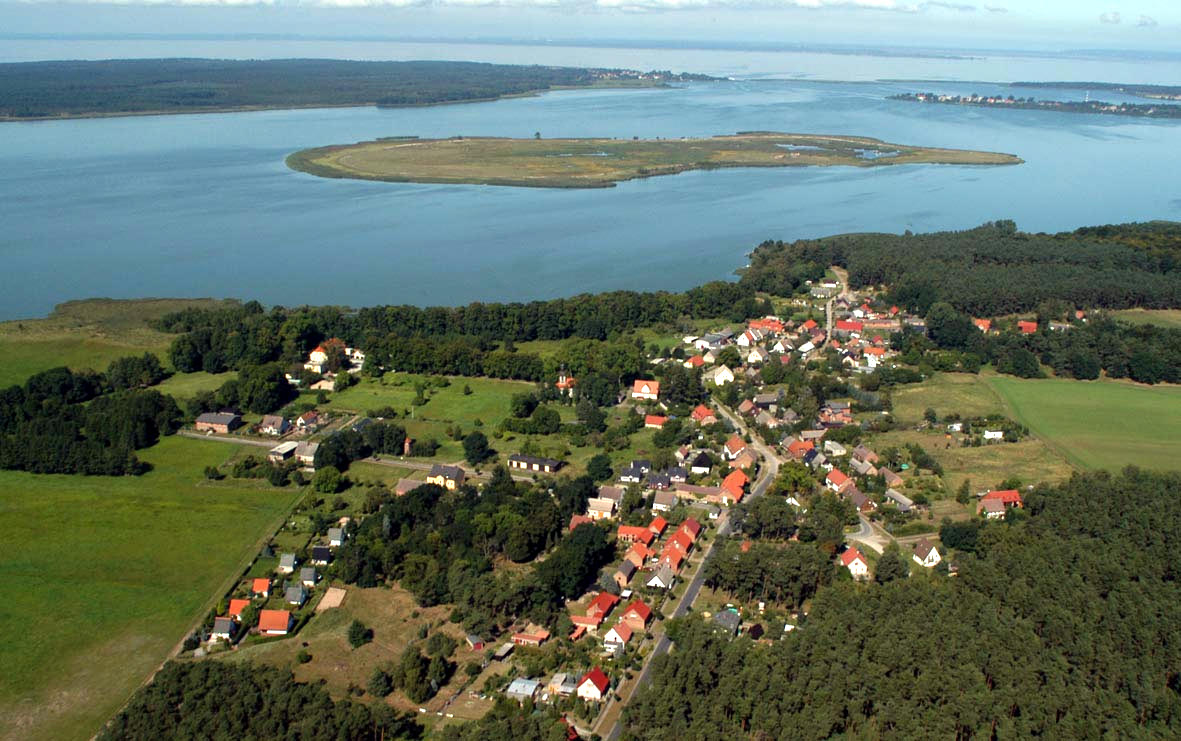
- Aerial photograph looking north. In the foreground is the village of Rieth, in the centre the island of Riether Werder in the Nowe Warpno Lake. In the background one can make out the Altwarp on the left bank, on the right, a narrow peninsula with the Polish town of Nowe Warpno enters the picture.
- Interactive map of Riether Werder

Geography
- Location: Szczecin Lagoon, Baltic Sea
- Coordinates: 53°42′23″N 14°15′31″E
- Area: 0.79 km^{2} (0.31 sq mi)

Administration
- Germany

Demographics
- Population: 0

The Riether Werder, also Riethscher Werder, is an island in the Nowe Warpno Lake, a bay in the Szczecin Lagoon. It is the only island in the lagoon on German territory.

The first recorded mention of the island dates to the year 1252, when Duke Barnim I of Pomerania gifted this island along with other possessions to Eldena Abbey. It was then given it the Slavic name Wozstro. The present name of the island is derived from the village of Rieth on the southern shore of the bay.

The island belongs to the district of Vorpommern-Greifswald in the German state of Mecklenburg-Vorpommern and lies in the extreme northeast of Germany. It has national importance as a bird island. It is 0.79 km^{2} (0.31 sq mi) in area and lies about a kilometre from the south and west shore of the Nowe Warpno Lake. The sea border with Poland runs immediately past the eastern tip of the island.

Since 1990, the island has been a nature preserve. Rare bird species such as the common tern and the snipe may be encountered here. White-tailed eagle, Montagu's harrier, marsh harrier, red kite, black kite, kestrel, hobby, honey buzzard and common buzzard are also found here. Access to the island is forbidden; like the west shore of the Nowe Warpno Lake it is part of the Altwarp Inland Dunes, Nowe Warpno Lake and Riether Werder Nature Reserve.
