= Nowe Warpno Bay =

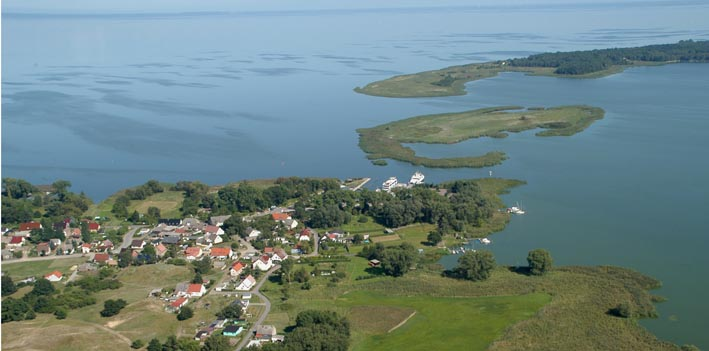
- The Łysa Island separating the Szczecin Lagoon from the Nowe Warpno Bay

- Location within West Pomeranian Voivodeship
- Location: Central Europe
- Coordinates: 53.7327°N 14.2855°E
- Type: Bay
- Primary inflows: Baltic Sea
- Basin countries: Poland, Germany
- Max. length: 1.9 km (1.2 mi)
- Max. width: 2.3 km (1.4 mi)
- Surface area: 30 km^{2} (12 sq mi)

Nowe Warpno Bay (Polish: Zatoka Nowowarpieńska) – a bay located in the southern part of the Szczecin Lagoon. The bay separates the land of the Wkrzańska Lowland. The southern waters of the bay are linked with the Nowe Warpno Lake. From the north, the bay is separated from the Szczecin Lagoon by the Łysa Island and the Grodzki Peninsula. Between the lake and the lagoon is located the Nowe Warpno Peninsula, on which the town of Nowe Warpno is located with the Nowe Warpno Seaport. On the north-western coast of the bay is located the village of Altwarp (Polish: Stare Warpno).
