= Nowe Warpno Town Hall =

- Ratusz w Nowym Warpnie
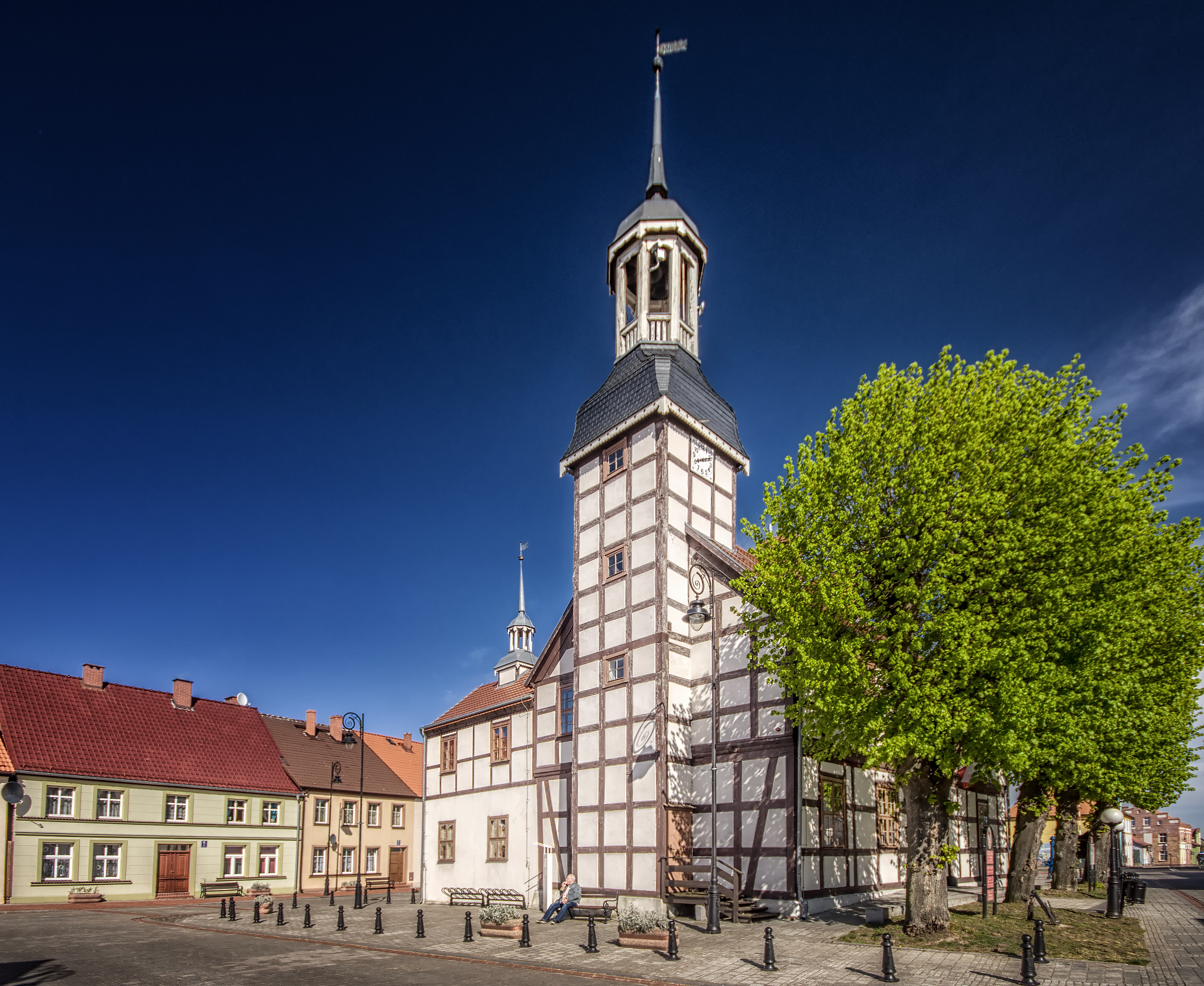
- Nowe Warpno Town Hall
- Interactive map of the Nowe Warpno Town Hall area

General information
- Type: Town hall
- Architectural style: Wattle and daub
- Location: Nowe Warpno, Poland
- Coordinates: 53.7253°N 14.2808°E
- Completed: 1697

Nowe Warpno Town Hall is a wattle and daub building in Nowe Warpno, West Pomeranian Voivodeship; in Poland. The building has a timber frame structure, built in 1697, after a large town fire destroyed the former town hall in 1692. The building has a unique architectural style to the region and is the most known landmark of Nowe Warpno.
