= Zeese =

Type of bottom trawl fishing net

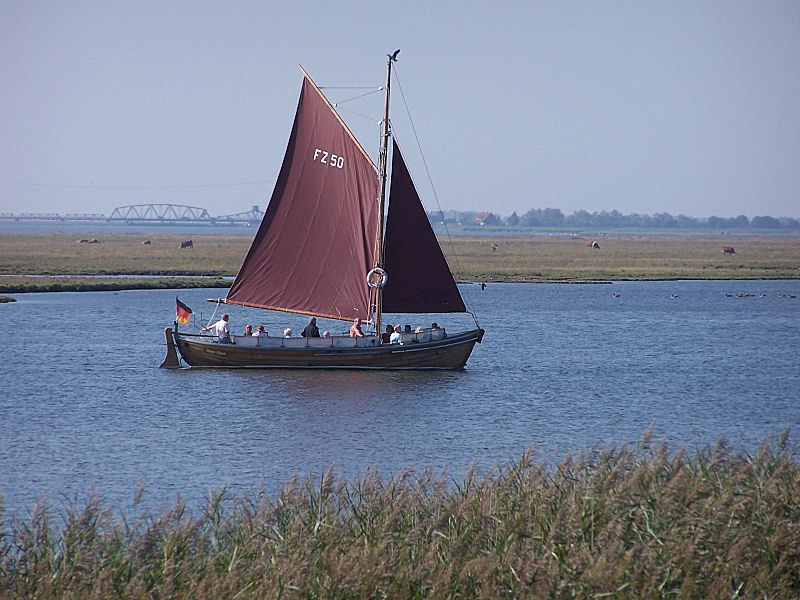
Zeesenboot on a Bodden.

A Zeese (pronounced [ˈtseːzə], pl. Zeesen) is a traditional type of fishing gear used for bottom trawling in the shallow coastal waters (Bodden) of Pomerania. Depending on the type of the Zeese, it is drawn by one or two boats (Zees(en)boot or Tuckern, respectively).

== Etymology ==
"Zeese" is one of the few words which remained in use after the medieval replacement of West Slavic dialects with Low German ones in northeastern Germany. According to Bielfeldt, it derives from Pomeranian seza, which in turn has its roots in Slavic *sěděti, meaning "sit."

== Zeese nets ==
The Zeese trawls used in the late 20th century were about 10 metres (33 ft) long, with wings of about 5 metres (16 ft). Historical Zeese trawls did not have wings, and all consisted of three consecutive compartments. From front to rear, these were termed Stolz, Mittelzeese or Hinternetz, and Stoß. Types of Zeese nets differed in size of these compartments, the size of the mouth, the size of the meshes, and whether a valve (Kohle) was integrated into the second compartment.

Historical types of Zeese trawls
Zeese	Length	Stolz	Mittelzeese	Stoß	Kohle	Trawler(s)
Tuckerzeese	18.8 to 19.5 metres (62 to 64 ft)	11.6 metres (38 ft)	6.3 metres (21 ft)	0.94 to 1.6 metres (3.1 to 5.2 ft)	4.7 to 5 metres (15 to 16 ft)	two Tuckern
Zeesenetz	15 to 19 metres (49 to 62 ft)	10.4 to 11.0 metres (34.1 to 36.1 ft)	6.9 to 7.2 metres (23 to 24 ft)	0.3 to 0.6 metres (0.98 to 1.97 ft)	3.8 metres (12 ft)	one Zeesenboot
Zollnerzeese	14.8 to 15.7 metres (49 to 52 ft)					two Zollnerkähne
Taglerzeese	6.9 metres (23 ft)	3.5 metres (11 ft)	3.1 metres (10 ft)	0.3 metres (0.98 ft)	2.8 metres (9.2 ft)	two rowing boats
Strohgarn / Streuer	4.7 to 5.6 metres (15 to 18 ft)				yes	two rowing boats
Treibgarn					none	two rowing boats
Stintzeese					none	two rowing or sailing boats
Triftzeese	4.7 to 5.6 metres (15 to 18 ft)				none	one Zeesenboot
Streichwade						
Kesser	(smaller variant of Streichwade)					
Gruzeese	(like Stintzeese)				yes	none (wading)
Grukesser	(smaller variant of Kesser)					

== Zeese trawlers ==
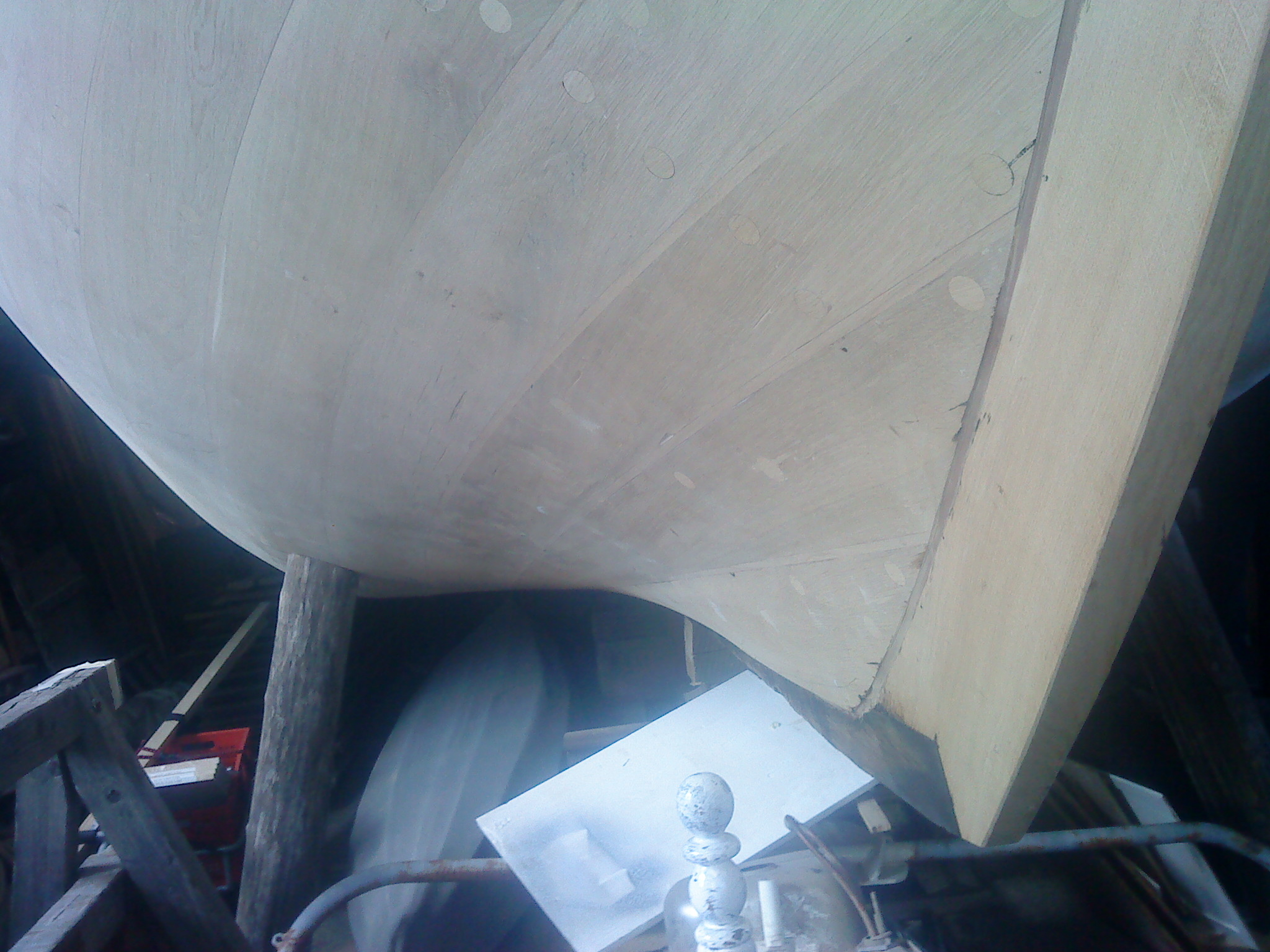
The hull of a Zeese trawler is wide and nearly flat at the bottom, with the keel protruding only a few centimetres, to allow sideward sailing.

Zeesenboot trawlers (Zeesenboote) are sailing boats which carry the Zeese on two ropes (Reepe) tied to stem and post stem or stem and Driftboom, a cantilever at the stern exceeding the length of the post stem. The Zeese is always on the luff side, since the trawler draws the net by drifting sidewards under full sail. The reddish color of most Zeesenboot sails derives from their traditional treatment with oak bark, to protect them against fungal infestation; to preserve their traditional look, this typical color is applied also to Zeesenboot sails made of modern materials.

== Sources ==
=== Bibliography ===
- Bielfeldt, Hans Holm (1982). Die slawischen Wörter im Deutschen. Opuscula (in German). Vol. 15. Zentralantiquariat der DDR.
- Emsmann, H. (1865). "Die Fischereiarten an und auf den Odermündungen bis aufwärts Stettin". Gaea (in German). Vol. 1. Lehmann. pp. 81–88.
- Greule, Albrecht, ed. (2001). Deutsche Kanzleisprachen im europäischen Kontext. Beiträge zur Kanzleisprachenforschung (in German). Vol. 1. Edition Praesens. ISBN 3-7069-0109-9.
- Rudolph, Wolfgang (1969). Segelboote der deutschen Ostseeküste (in German). Akademie-Verlag.
