= Gmina Nowe Warpno =

Gmina Nowe Warpno Nowe Warpno Commune
- Gmina
- Coat of arms
- Interactive map of Gmina Nowe Warpno
- Coordinates (Nowe Warpno): 53°43′N 14°16′E
- Country: Poland
- Voivodeship: West Pomeranian
- County: Police
- Seat: Nowe Warpno

Area
  - Total: 197.07 km^{2} (76.09 sq mi)

Population (2006)
  - Total: 1,534
  - Density: 7.784/km^{2} (20.16/sq mi)
  - Urban: 1,170
  - Rural: 364
- Website: http://www.nowewarpno.pl/

Gmina Nowe Warpno is an urban-rural gmina (administrative district) in Police County, West Pomeranian Voivodeship, in north-western Poland, on the German border. Its seat is the town of Nowe Warpno, which lies approximately 29 kilometres (18 mi) north-west of Police and 40 km (25 mi) north-west of the regional capital Szczecin.

The gmina covers an area of 197.07 square kilometres (76.1 sq mi), and as of 2006 its total population is 1,534 (out of which the population of Nowe Warpno amounts to 1,170, and the population of the rural part of the gmina is 364).

== Villages ==
Apart from the town of Nowe Warpno, Gmina Nowe Warpno contains the villages and settlements of Brzózki, Maszkowo, Mszczuje, Myślibórz Mały, Myślibórz Wielki, Popielewo, Trzebieradz and Warnołęka.

== Tourism ==
The most interesting places are Szczecin Lagoon, Puszcza Wkrzańska Forest and an old architecture in Nowe Warpno and villages in the area, e.g. Assumption of Mary Church in Nowe Warpno (15th century), the town hall in Nowe Warpno built in 1697 and Black Madonna of Częstochowa Church in Warnołęka (18th century).

== Neighbouring gminas ==
Gmina Nowe Warpno is bordered by the city of Świnoujście and by the gminas of Police and Stepnica. It also borders Germany.

== Gallery ==
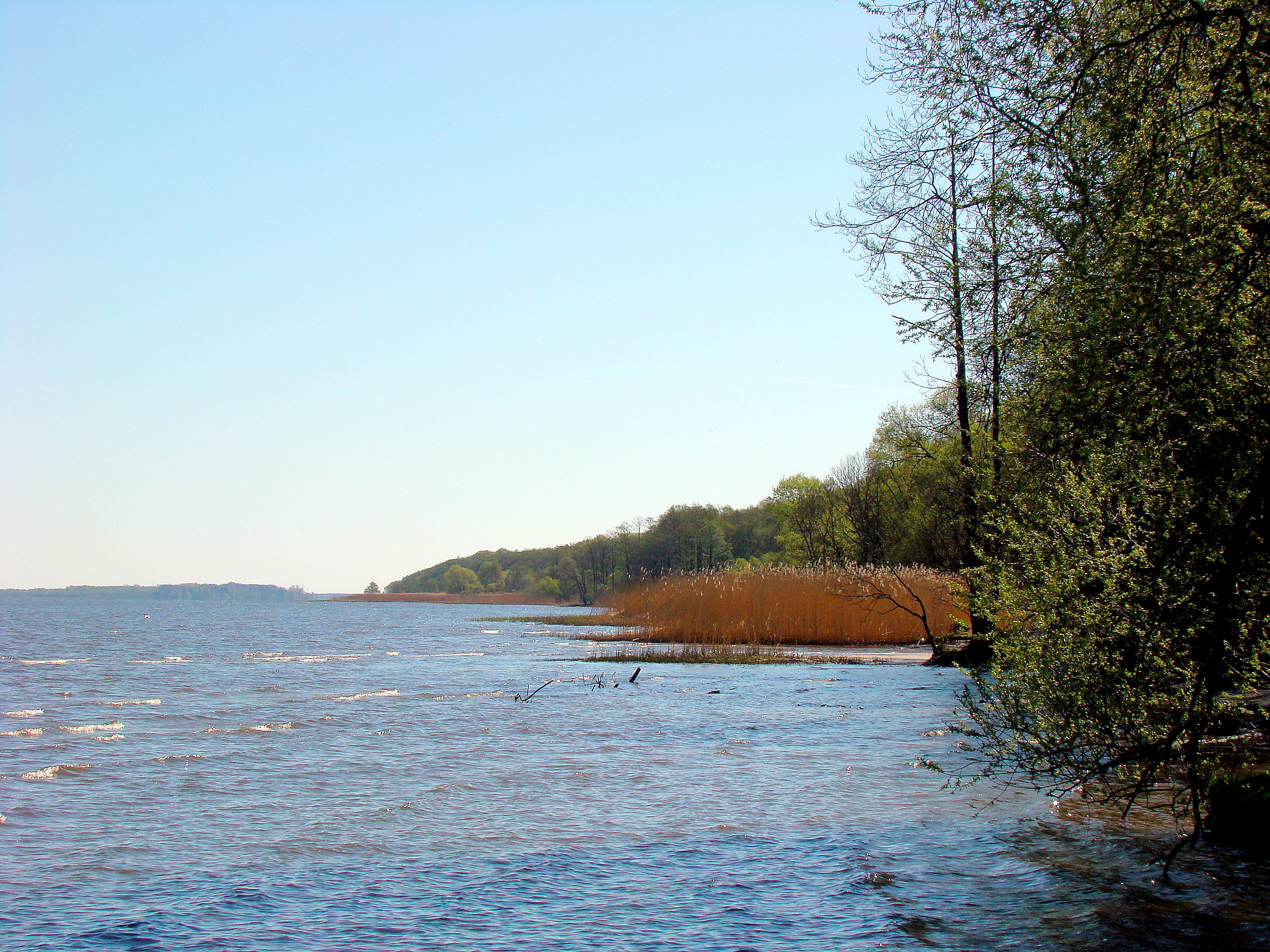
Szczecin Lagoon

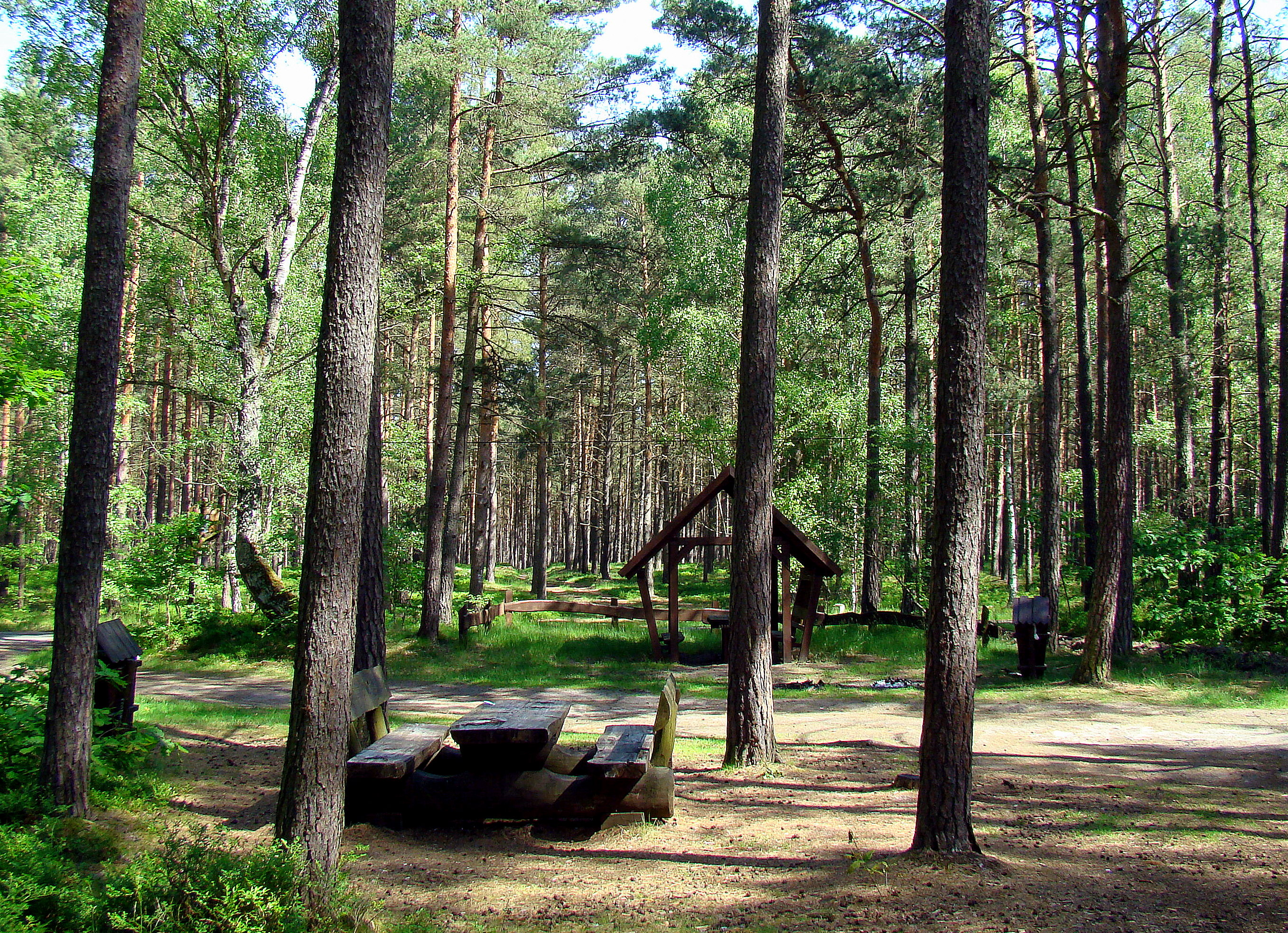
Forest - Puszcza Wkrzańska

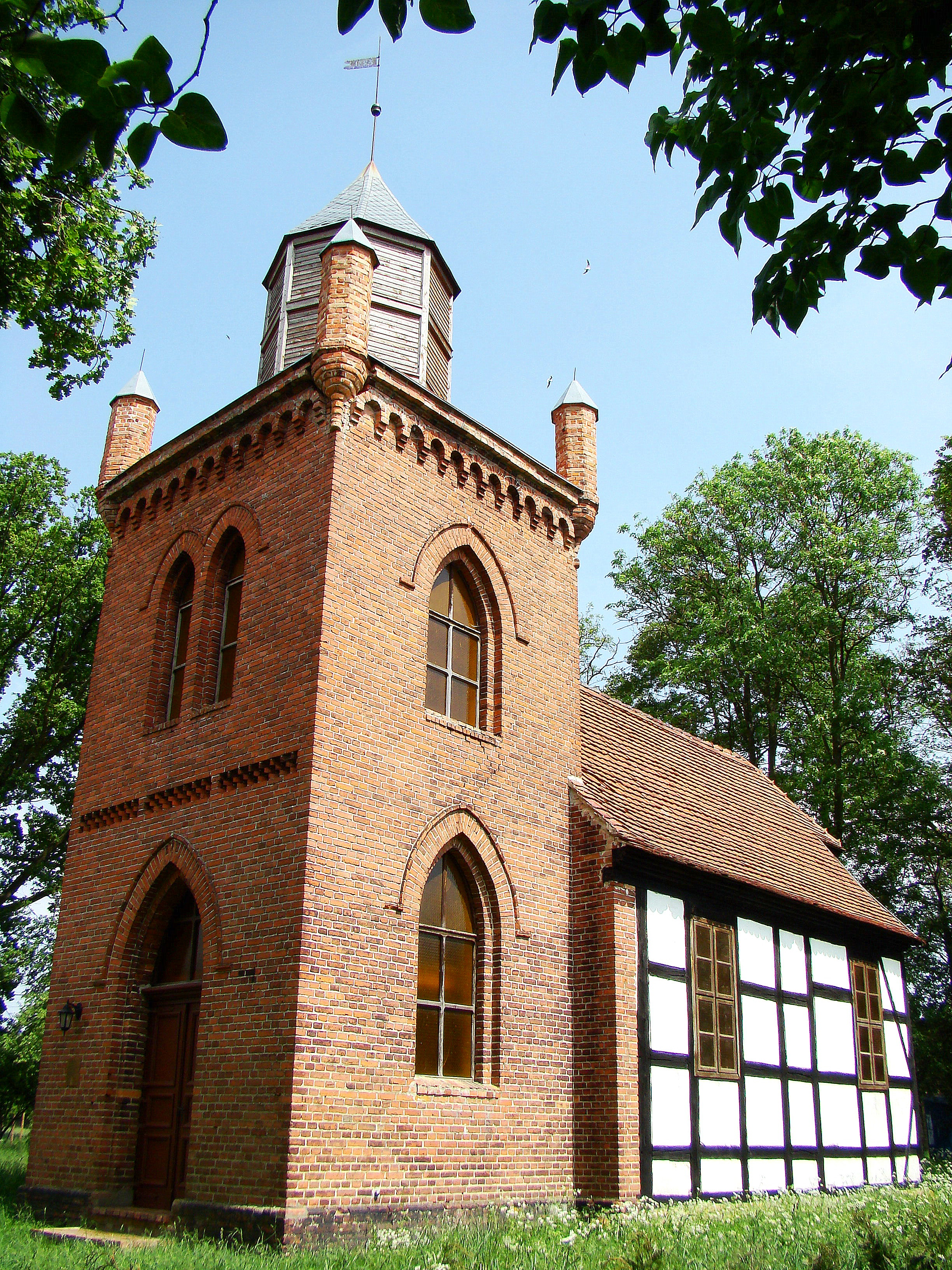
Saint Hubertus Church in Nowe Warpno - Karszno

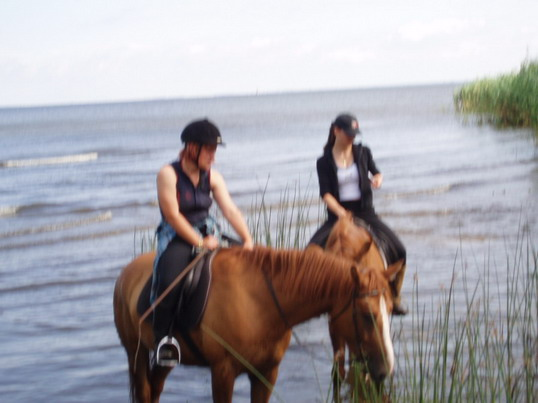
Brzózki
