= Nowe Warpno Lake =

Bay on the shore of the Szczecin Lagoon

Coordinates: 53°42′38″N 14°16′28″E

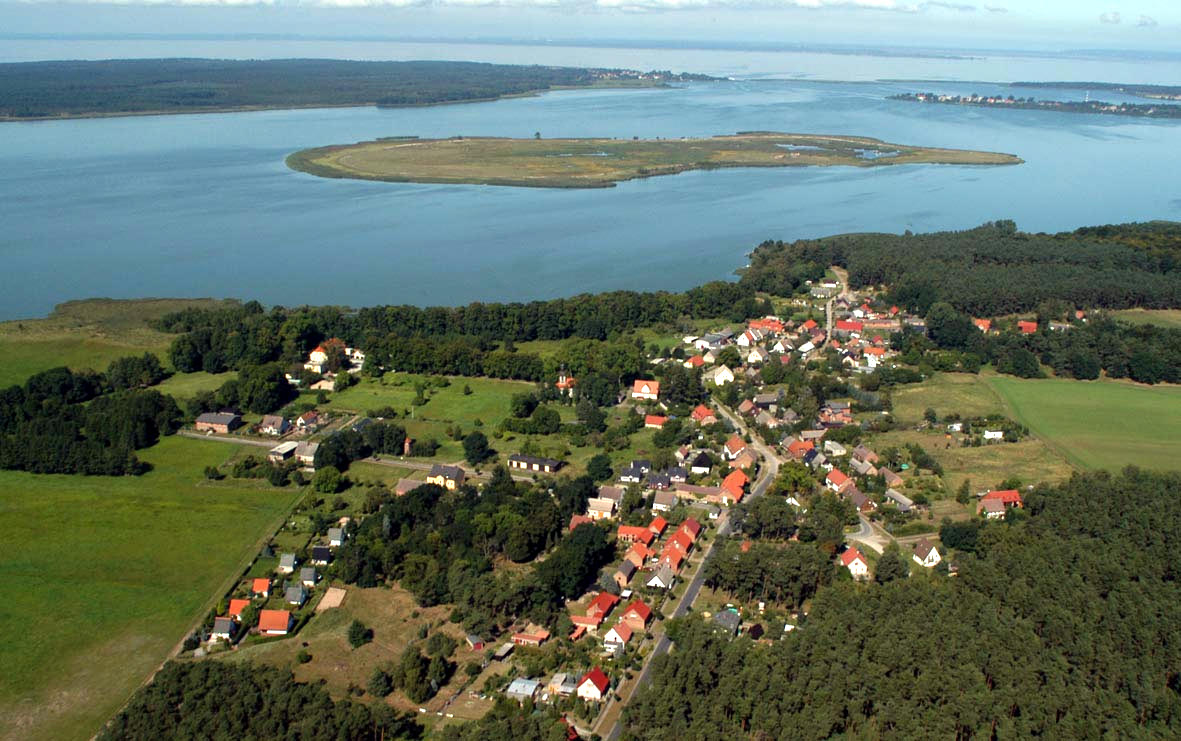
The Neuwarper See and the island of Riether Werder

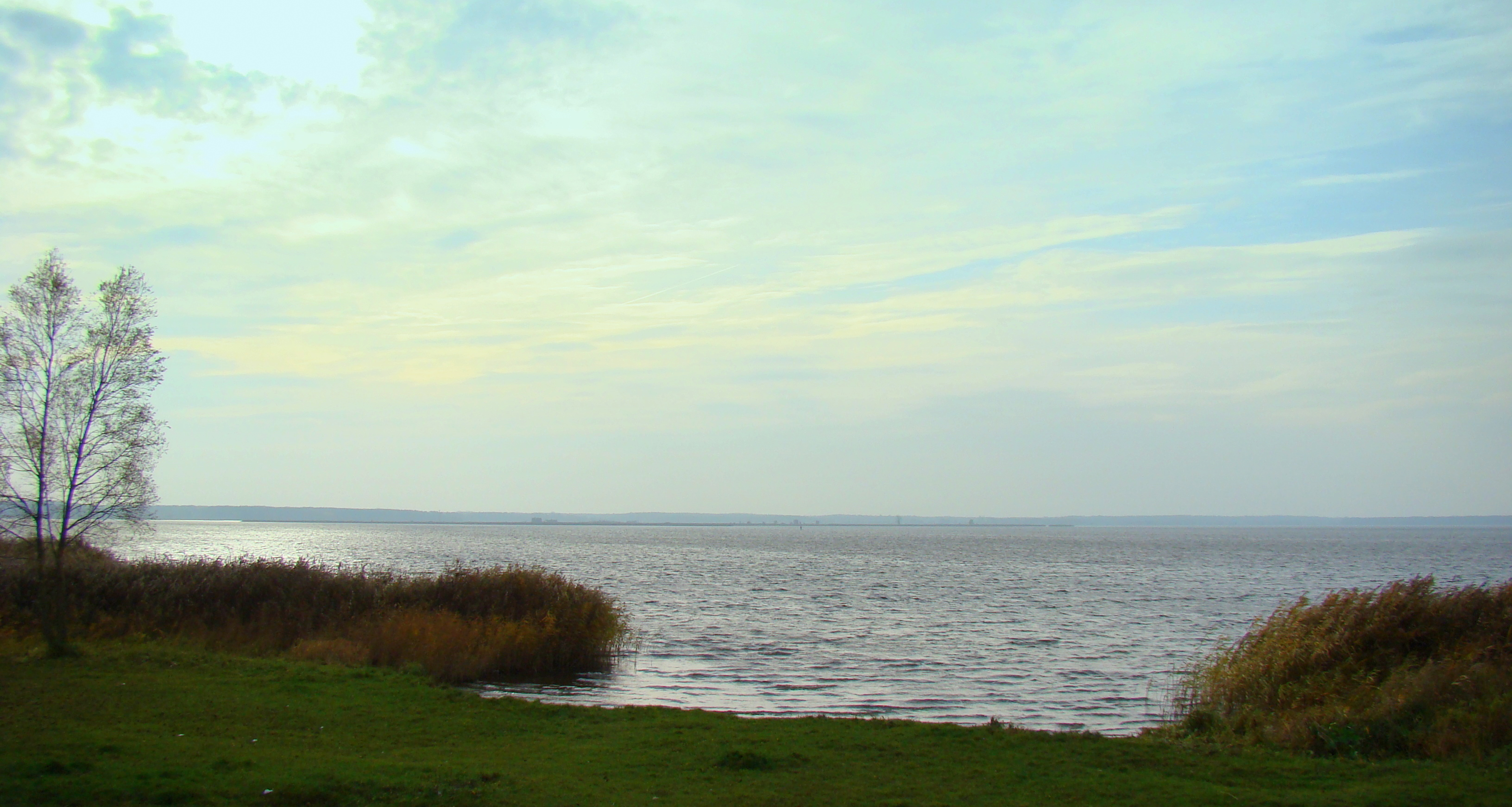
Neuwarper See

The Nowe Warpno Lake (German: Neuwarper See, Warper See; Polish: Jezioro Nowowarpieńskie) is a bay on the southern shore of the Szczecin Lagoon. It runs for about 6 kilometres (3.7 mi) into the interior and has two narrow channels to the lagoon in the north that are each only 150 metres (490 ft) wide and divided by a small island of reeds.

The west and south shores of the bay belong to the district of Vorpommern-Greifswald in the German federal state of Mecklenburg-Vorpommern, while the east shore is part of the Polish West Pomeranian Voivodeship (Police County). On the Neuwarper See lie the municipality of Altwarp and the village of Rieth in the municipality of Luckow, as well as the town of Nowe Warpno (Neuwarp) and its districts – Podgrodzie (Altstadt) and Karszno (Albrechtsdorf). The island of Riether Werder, 0.83 km^{2} in area, lies in the German part of the Neuwarper See and is, like the entire shore between Altwarp and Rieth a nature reserve. The island of Łysa Wyspa (Kahleberg) lies in Polish waters.

Passenger ferries run between Altwarp and Neuwarp all year round (6 trips each way from 10:00 to 17:30).
