= Kurenkahn =

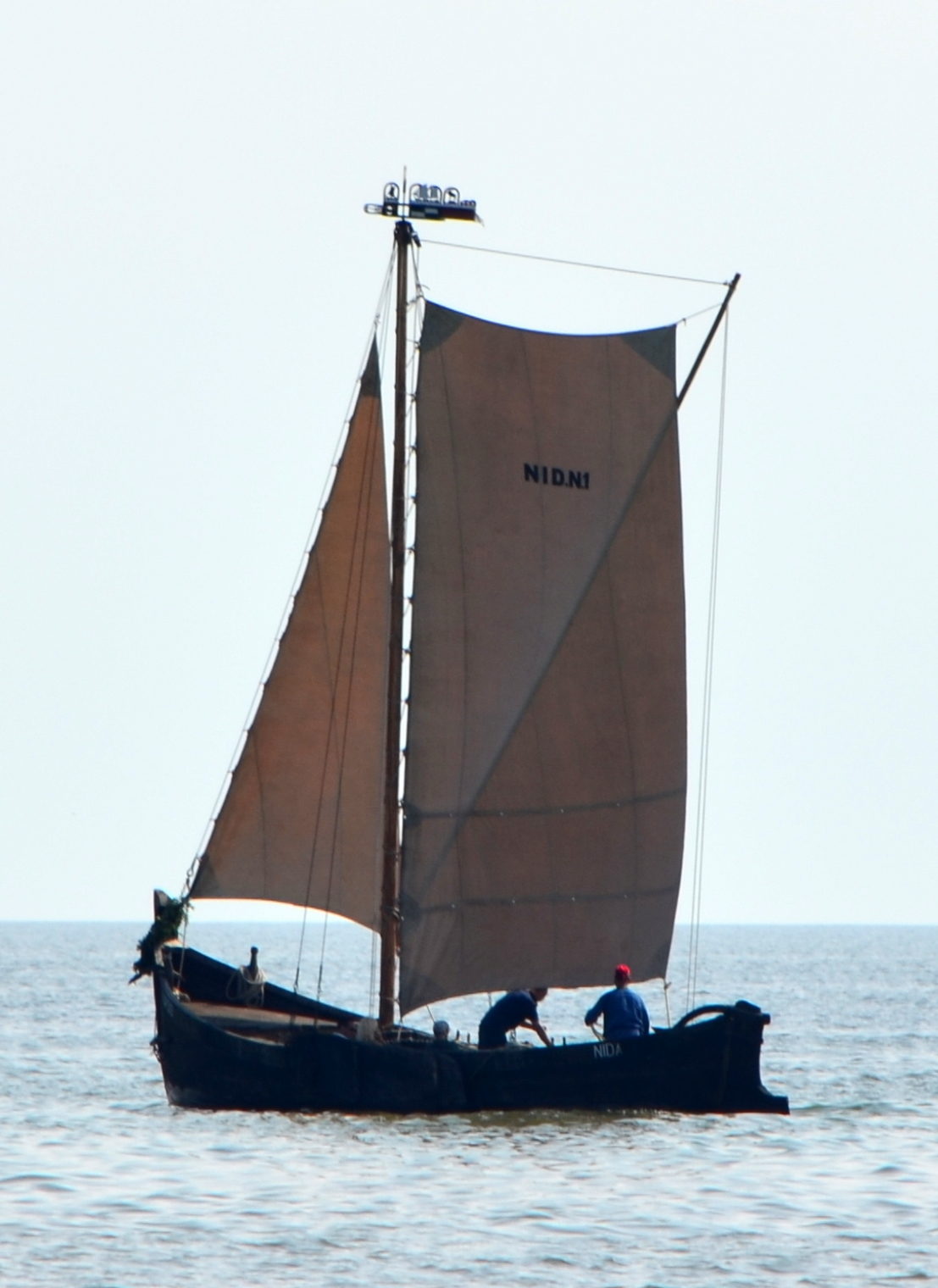
Kurenkahn

The Kurenkahn (German plural Kurenkähne; Lithuanian: kurėnas) is a traditional wooden type of flat bottom boat that was used in Vistula lagoon and Curonian Lagoon, East Prussia. The name comes from the German name of the Curonian people (Kuren). Kurenkahns were 11–12 m long, with two main sails: the large and the small. Kurenkahns were used to catch fish by dragging a large net (Kurrennetz) in pairs. After the expulsion of Germans from East Prussia, Kurenkahns were used for some time for fishing, but were later abandoned. In 2001 a replica of a Kurenkahn was rebuilt in part of former Memel territory now in Lithuania.

== Bibliography ==
- Werner Jaeger, nd: Die Fischerkähne auf dem kurischen Haff ISBN 3895341606
- Hans Woede, 1966: Die Wimpel der Kurenkähne. Geschichte – Bedeutung – Brauchtum. Würzburg
- Martin Kakies, 2002: Die Kurische Nehrung in 144 Bildern. Rautenberg ISBN 3800330091
