= Altwarp =

- Municipality
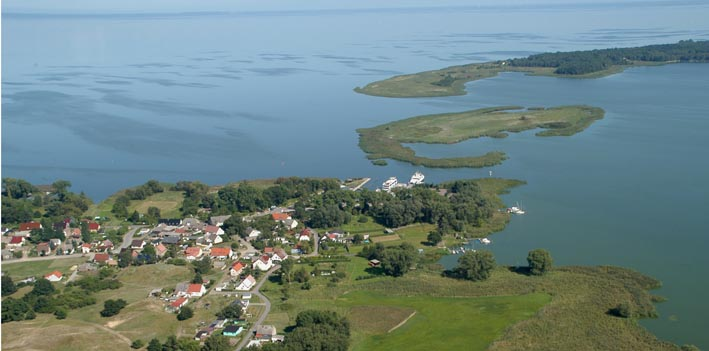

- Location of Altwarp within Vorpommern-Greifswald district
- Interactive map of Altwarp
- Location within Germany Location within Mecklenburg-Vorpommern
- Coordinates: 53°45′N 14°16′E
- Country: Germany
- State: Mecklenburg-Vorpommern
- District: Vorpommern-Greifswald
- Municipal assoc.: Am Stettiner Haff

Government
  - Mayor: Rolf Bauer

Area
  - Total: 32.54 km^{2} (12.56 sq mi)
- Elevation: 5 m (16 ft)

Population (2025-12-31)
  - Total: 404
  - Density: 12.4/km^{2} (32.2/sq mi)
- Time zone: UTC+01:00 (CET)
  - Summer (DST): UTC+02:00 (CEST)
- Postal codes: 17375
- Dialling codes: 039773
- Vehicle registration: VG
- Website: www.amt-am-stettiner-haff.de

Altwarp (Polish: Stare Warpno) is a municipality in the state of Mecklenburg-Vorpommern in north-eastern Germany, on the border with Poland. It has about 500 inhabitants and is located on the Nowe Warpno Bay opposite the Polish town of Nowe Warpno within the historic region of Pomerania.

== History ==
From 1648 to 1720, Altwarp was part of Swedish Pomerania. From 1720 to 1945, it was part of the Prussian Province of Pomerania.

From 1945 to 1952, Altwarp was part of the State of Mecklenburg-Vorpommern, from 1952 to 1990 of the Bezirk Neubrandenburg of East Germany and since 1990 again of Mecklenburg-Vorpommern.
