= Municipalities of Poland =

Municipal-level administrative division of Poland

Municipalities of Poland Gmina (Polish)
- Also known as: Commune
- Category: Municipality
- Location: Poland
- Found in: Powiat
- Number: 2,479 (as of 2025)
- Possible types: Rural gmina; Urban-rural gmina; Urban gmina
- Possible status: City with powiat rights
- Government: Mayor–council government

Municipalities (Polish: Gmina [ˈɡmina]; pl. gminy [ˈɡminɨ]) are the basic unit of the administrative division of Poland. As of 1 January 2019, there were 2,479 municipalities throughout the country, encompassing over 43,000 villages. 940 municipalities include cities and towns, with 322 among them constituting an independent urban municipality (Polish: gmina miejska) consisting solely of a standalone town or one of the 107 cities, the latter governed by a city mayor (prezydent miasta).

Municipalities have been the basic unit of territorial division in Poland since 1974, when it replaced the smaller gromada. Three or more municipalities make up a higher level unit called a county (powiat), except for those holding the status of a city with powiat rights. Each and every county has the seat in a city or town, in the latter case either an urban municipality or a part of an urban-rural municipality.

== Types ==
There are three types of municipalities:

1. 302 urban municipality (gmina miejska) constituted either by a standalone town or one of the 107 cities, the latter governed by a city mayor (prezydent miasta), including 66 cities with county rights (miasto na prawach powiatu)
2. 724 mixed urban-rural municipality (gmina miejsko-wiejska) consisting of a town and surrounding villages and countryside; other than Gmina Nowe Skalmierzyce, seat of an urban-rural gmina is almost always located in the town
3. 1,453 rural municipality (gmina wiejska) consisting only of villages and countryside (occasionally of just one village).

Some rural municipalities have their seat in a town which itself is outside of the municipality's territory. For example, the rural Augustów Municipality is administered from the town of Augustów, but does not include the town, as Augustów is an urban type municipality in its own right.

107 urban municipalities constitute cities, distinguished from towns through being governed by a city mayor (prezydent miasta) instead of a town mayor (burmistrz), the status awarded automatically to all urban gminy over 100,000 inhabitants or those with a status of a city with powiat rights, with some others allowed to retain the earlier awarded title due to historical reasons. 66 among the 107 cities (including all voivodeship seats and all cities over 100,000 inhabitants) have the special status of city with powiat rights. Such a city exercises also powers and duties of a powiat while not belonging to any; nevertheless, it may still be a seat of a regular powiat, albeit without belonging to it administratively (such powiat thus being often "doughnut-shaped"). In such cities, the roles of the powiat organs are fulfilled by the ones of the urban gmina.

== Government ==
Polish municipalities operate under a mayor-council government.

The legislative and oversight body of each municipality is the elected municipal council (rada gminy), in an urban-rural municipality called the town and municipality council (rada miasta i gminy), while in an urban municipality it is called the town/city council (rada miasta).

Any local laws considered non-compliant with the national ones may be invalidated by the respective voivode, whose rulings may be appealed to an administrative court. Decisions in individual cases may in turn be appealed to quasi-judicial bodies named local government boards of appeal, their ruling subject to appeal to an administrative court.

Executive power is held in the municipality by a directly elected official, called wójt in rural municipality, a town mayor (burmistrz) in urban-rural and most urban municipalities which contain towns, or a city mayor (prezydent miasta) in the 107 urban municipalities containing cities, the status awarded automatically to all urban municipalities over 100,000 inhabitants or those with a status of a city with powiat rights, with some others allowed to retain the earlier awarded title due to historical reasons. A town or city mayor may be scrutinized or denied funding for his/her projects by the council, but is not politically responsible to it and does not require its confidence to remain in office; therefore, cohabitation is not uncommon.

In a city with powiat rights, the city mayor additionally has the powers and duties of a powiat executive board and a starosta, while the city council has the powers and duties of a powiat (county) council; both nevertheless being elected under the municipal election rules rather than those applicable to county elections.

A recall referendum may be triggered either in respect to the wójt/town mayor/city mayor or to the municipal council through a petition supported by at least 1/10 of eligible voters, but the turnout in the recall referendum must be at least 3/5 of the number of people voting in the original election in order for the referendum to be valid and binding. In addition, elected bodies of any municipality may be suspended by the prime minister of Poland in case of persisting law transgressions or negligence, resulting in such case in the municipality being placed under receivership.

A gmina may create auxiliary units (jednostki pomocnicze), which play a subordinate administrative role. In rural areas these are called sołectwa, in towns they may be dzielnice or osiedla and in an urban-rural municipality, the town itself may be designated as an auxiliary unit. The only gmina which is statutorily obliged to have auxiliary units is Warsaw, which is divided since 2002 into 18 boroughs exercising some devolved powers, though not considered separate entities.

== Administrative tasks and objectives ==
Each municipality carries out two classes of tasks:

- own tasks – public tasks exercised by municipality as its inherent exclusive competence and financed by its own means, which serve to satisfy the needs of the community.
- commissioned tasks – tasks of the central government, delegated entirely or partially to municipality, along with an appropriate mandatory government subvention to support them.

The tasks can be also divided into another two categories:

- compulsory – where the municipality cannot abstain from carrying out the tasks, and must set up a budget to carry them out in order to provide the inhabitants with the basic public benefits
- optional – where the municipality can carry them out in accordance with available budgetary means, set out only to specific local needs (on the municipality's own responsibility and budget).

=== Own tasks ===
Own tasks include matters such as:

- spatial harmony,
- real estate management,
- environmental protection and nature conservation,
- water management,
- country roads,
- public streets,
- bridges,
- squares and traffic systems,
- water supply systems and source,
- the sewage system,
- removal of urban waste,
- water treatment,
- maintenance of cleanliness and order,
- sanitary facilities,
- dumps and council waste,
- supply of electric and thermal energy and gas,
- public transport,
- health care,
- welfare,
- care homes,
- subsidized housing,
- public education,
- cultural facilities including public libraries and other cultural institutions,
- historic monuments conservation and protection,
- the sports facilities and tourism including recreational grounds and devices,
- marketplaces and covered markets,
- green spaces and public parks,
- communal graveyards,
- public order and safety,
- fire and flood protection with equipment maintenance and storage,
- maintaining objects and devices of the public utility and administrative buildings,
- pro-family policy including social support for pregnant women,
- medical and legal care,
- supporting and popularising the self-government initiatives and cooperation within the commune including with non-governmental organizations,
- interaction with regional communities from other countries,
- etc.

== Overall number of municipality by type ==
Number of gminy by voivodeship
Voivodeship	LS	KP	LBL	LBS	ŁD	LP	MS	OP	SK	PD	PM	SL	ŚWK	WM	GP	WP	Poland
Urban gminy	36	17	20	9	18	15	35	3	16	13	25	49	5	16	19	11	307
Urban-rural gminy	55	35	22	33	25	43	50	32	31	24	17	22	26	33	90	52	588
Rural gminy	78	92	171	41	134	124	229	36	113	81	81	96	71	67	117	51	1,584
Total gminy	169	144	213	83	177	182	314	71	160	118	123	167	102	116	226	114	2,479
of which: rural gminy with their seat outside the gmina	14	13	17	5	15	9	15	0	12	12	13	0	1	15	11	8	160

Abbreviations used for voivodeships:
LS: Lower Silesian Voivodeship, KP: Kuyavian-Pomeranian Voivodeship, LBL: Lublin Voivodeship, LBS: Lubusz Voivodeship,
ŁD: Łódź Voivodeship, LP: Lesser Poland Voivodeship, MS: Masovian Voivodeship, OP: Opole Voivodeship,
SK: Subcarpathian Voivodeship, PD: Podlaskie Voivodeship, PM: Pomeranian Voivodeship, SL: Silesian Voivodeship,
ŚWK: Świętokrzyskie Voivodeship, WM: Warmian-Masurian Voivodeship, GP: Greater Poland Voivodeship, WP: West Pomeranian Voivodeship.

== Largest and smallest municipalities ==
LARGEST	Population (2006 estimate)	Land area in km^{2}	Population density per km^{2}
Urban	Warsaw (1,697,596)	Warsaw (517.22)	Świętochłowice (4,156.80)
Rural	Gmina Chełmiec (24,344)	Gmina Wałcz (574.89)	Gmina Buczkowice (542.70)
Urban-rural	Gmina Piaseczno (61,525)	Gmina Pisz (633.69)	Gmina Wołomin (801.69)
Town in urban-rural municipality	Gmina Nysa: Nysa (47,545)	Gmina Szczytna: Szczytna (80.38)	Gmina Swarzędz: Swarzędz (3,469.23)
Rural part of urban-rural municipality	Gmina Wieliczka: rural part (28,864)	Gmina Pisz: rural part (623.61)	Gmina Świątniki Górne: rural part (407.86)
SMALLEST	Population (2006 estimate)	Land area in km^{2}	Population density per km^{2}
Urban	Krynica Morska (1,364)	Górowo Iławeckie (3.32)	Krynica Morska (11.74)
Rural	Gmina Cisna (1,663)	Gmina Jejkowice (7.59)	Gmina Lutowiska (4.63)
Urban-rural	Gmina Nowe Warpno (1,559)	Gmina Świątniki Górne (20.35)	Gmina Nowe Warpno (7.88)
Town in urban-rural municipality	Gmina Wyśmierzyce: Wyśmierzyce (892)	Gmina Stawiszyn: Stawiszyn (0.99)	Gmina Suraż: Suraż (28.94)
Rural part of urban-rural municipality	Gmina Nowe Warpno: rural part (363)	Gmina Suchedniów: rural part (15.54)	Gmina Nowe Warpno: rural part (2.09)

== See also ==
- List of Polish gminas
