= Nowe Warpno =

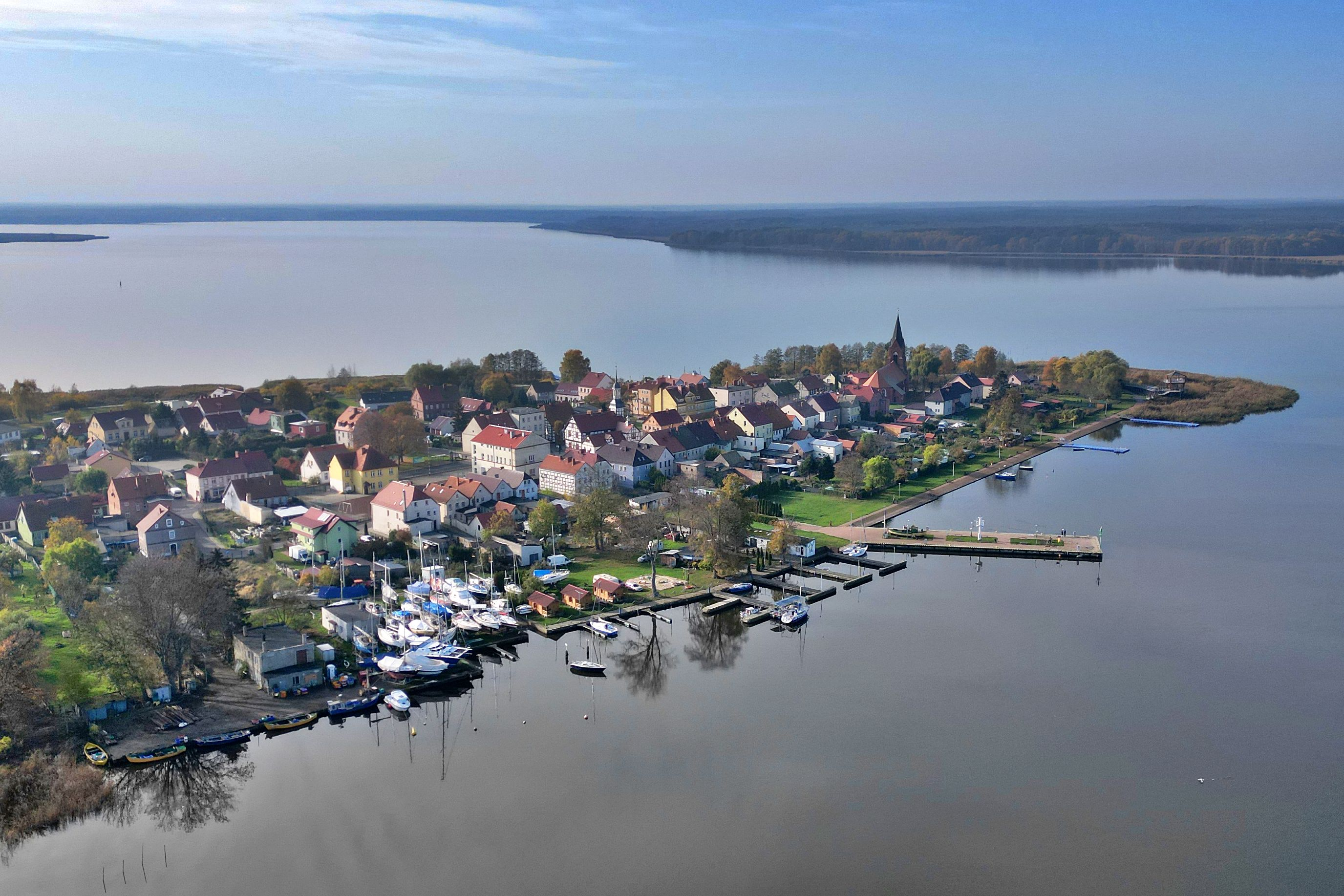
- Aerial view of the town center and Nowe Warpno Bay

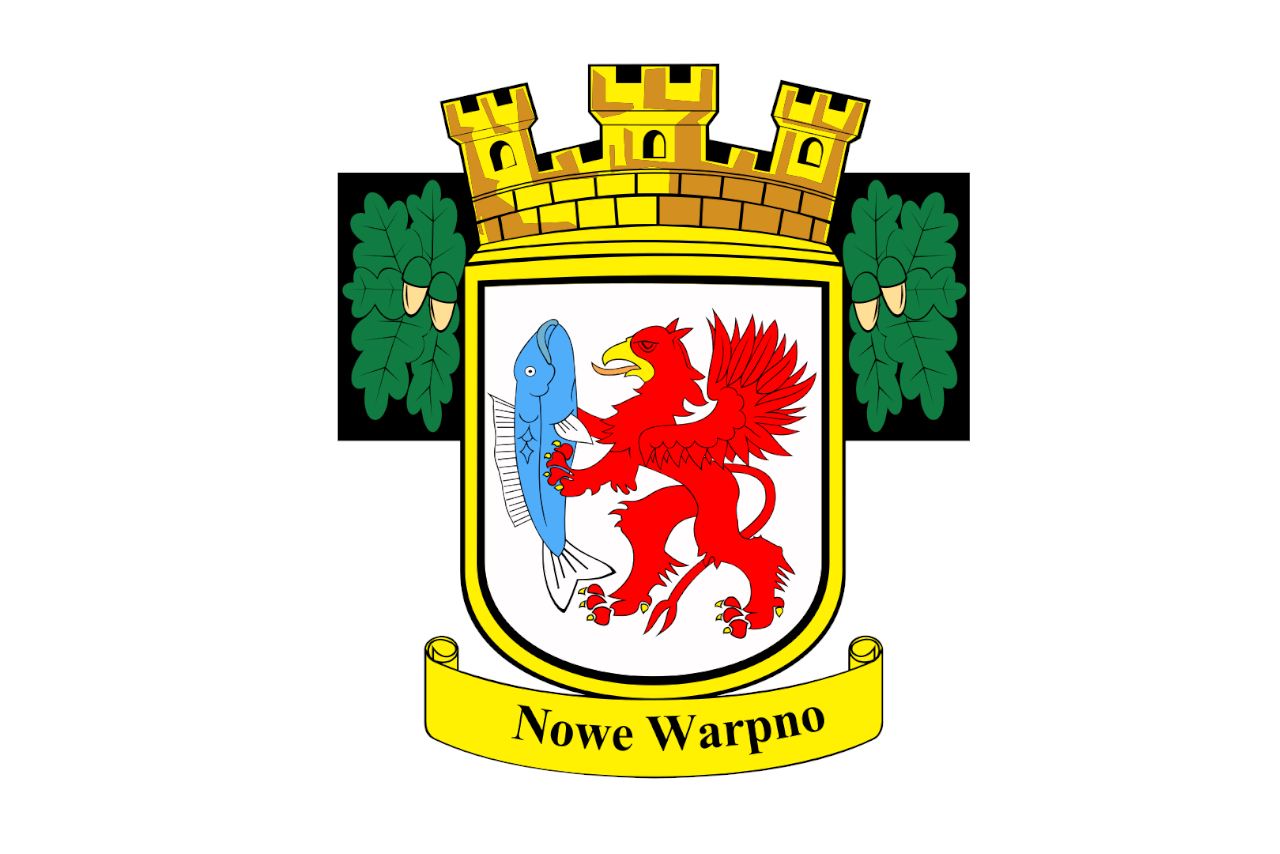
- Flag Coat of arms
- Interactive map of Nowe Warpno
- Location within Poland
- Coordinates: 53°43′N 14°16′E
- Country: Poland
- Voivodeship: West Pomeranian
- County: Police
- Gmina: Nowe Warpno
- First mentioned: 1184

Area
  - Total: 24.51 km^{2} (9.46 sq mi)

Population (2022)
  - Total: 1,097
  - Density: 44.76/km^{2} (115.9/sq mi)
- Time zone: UTC+1 (CET)
  - Summer (DST): UTC+2 (CEST)
- Postal code: 72-022
- Vehicle registration: ZPL
- Website: https://nowewarpno.pl/

Nowe Warpno [ˈnɔvɛ ˈvarpnɔ] (German: Neuwarp) is a historic town in northwestern Poland, within Police County in West Pomeranian Voivodeship.

== Location ==
The town lies on the shore of the Nowe Warpno Bay of the Szczecin Lagoon, at the border with Germany. It is the seat of the urban-rural administrative district called Gmina Nowe Warpno. The town, located in the historic Western Pomerania, is known for its lagoon marina, a seventeenth-century timber-framed town hall and old core.

The town's population is 1,170 (according to figures for 2006). The rural part of its gmina has the lowest population density of any such division in Poland, with only 2.09 persons/km^{2}; the town's density (48.8/km^{2}) raises the overall population density of the gmina to 7.88/km^{2}, still the fourth lowest in Poland.

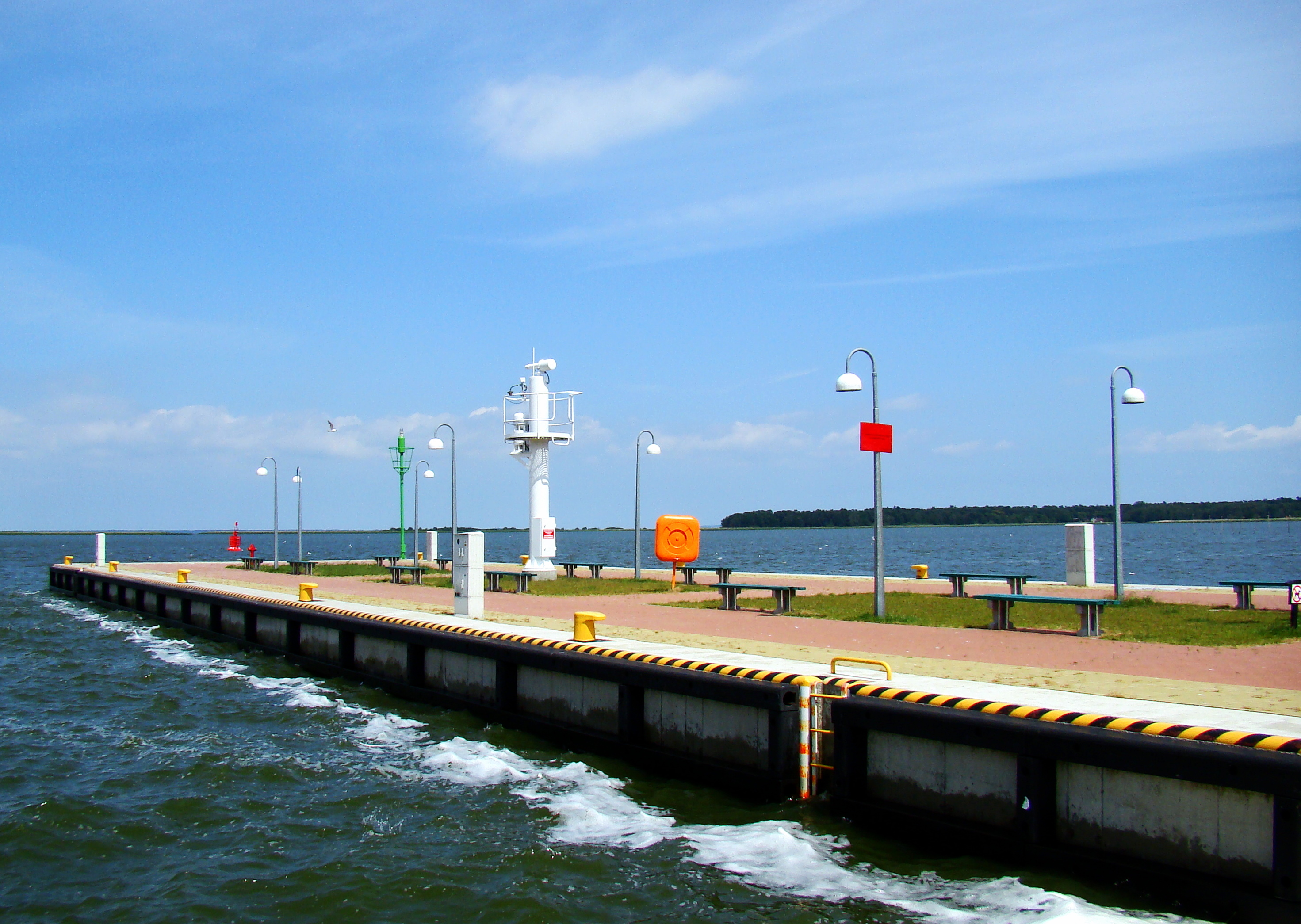
Port of Nowe Warpno

The town is on the inlet of Nowe Warpno Bay on the southern shore of the Szczecin Lagoon. Across an 800 m wide strait lies the village of Altwarp in the German part of Pomerania. A small uninhabited island being part of Nowe Warpno lies only 70 m off the coast of Altwarp.

A ferry runs between Nowe Warpno and Altwarp (Stare Warpno) across the German border. There used to be a duty-free shop on board, but this ended when Poland joined the European Union.

Nearby Podgrodzie is in Nowe Warpno district (in the past it was a separate locality). It lies on a picturesque headland with several vacation centres.

== Tourism ==
Nowe Warpno is a popular destination for regional tourism, and international tourists, mainly from Germany. Available accommodation in the town includes a resort, a marina, camping, a guest house, and rooms in private homes.

The Old Town of Nowe Warpno has a number of historical monuments, including the unique timber framed Nowe Warpno Town Hall, the Church of the Assumption and preserved old townhouses. Outside the Old Town there are the Saint Hubertus church and the palace in Karszno, former post of the Polish Border Protection Troops.

== Twinning cities ==
The sister cities of Nowe Warpno are:

- Ueckermünde, Germany
- Sande, Lower Saxony, Germany

== See also ==
- Tourism in Poland

== Gallery ==
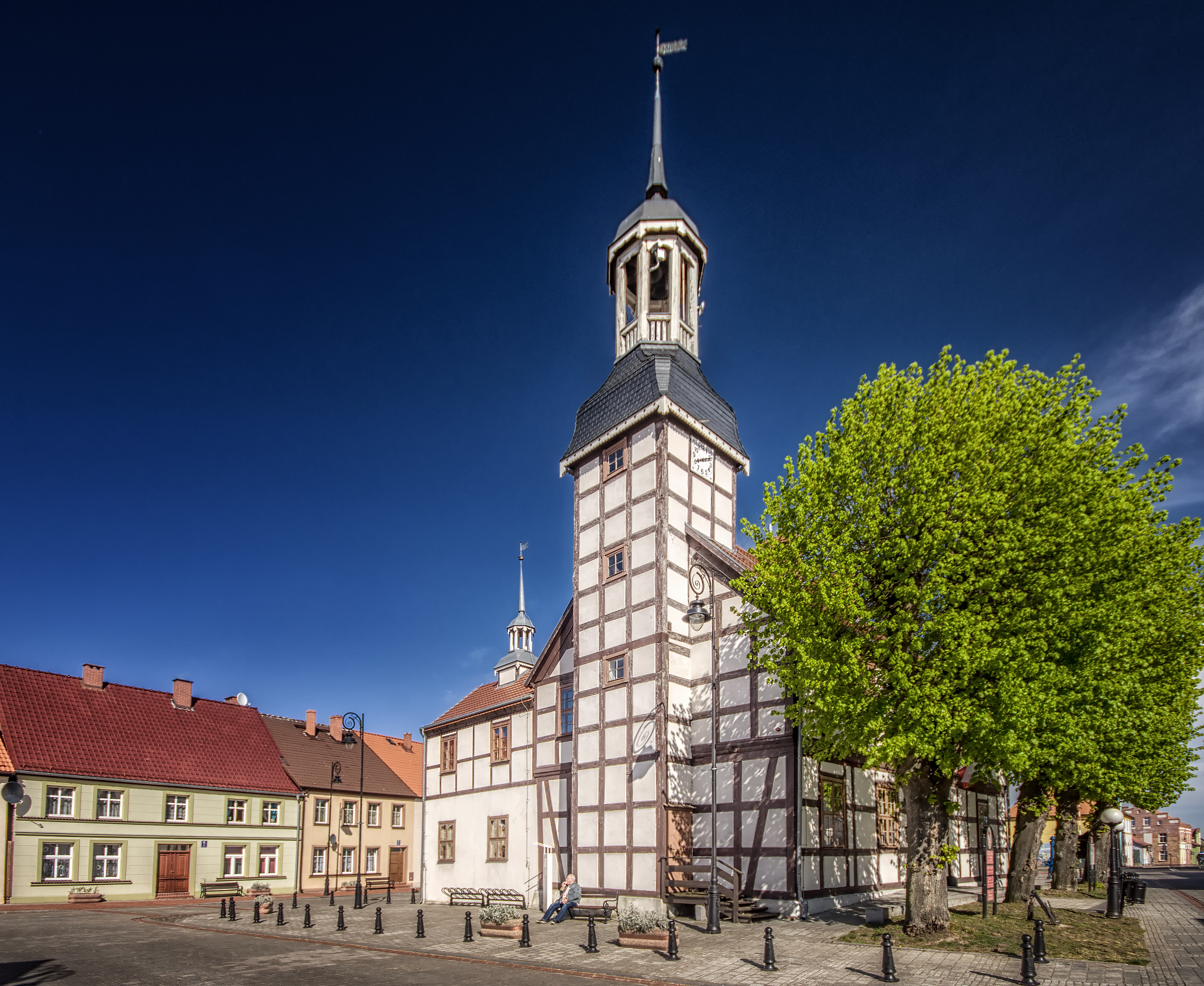
Town Hall

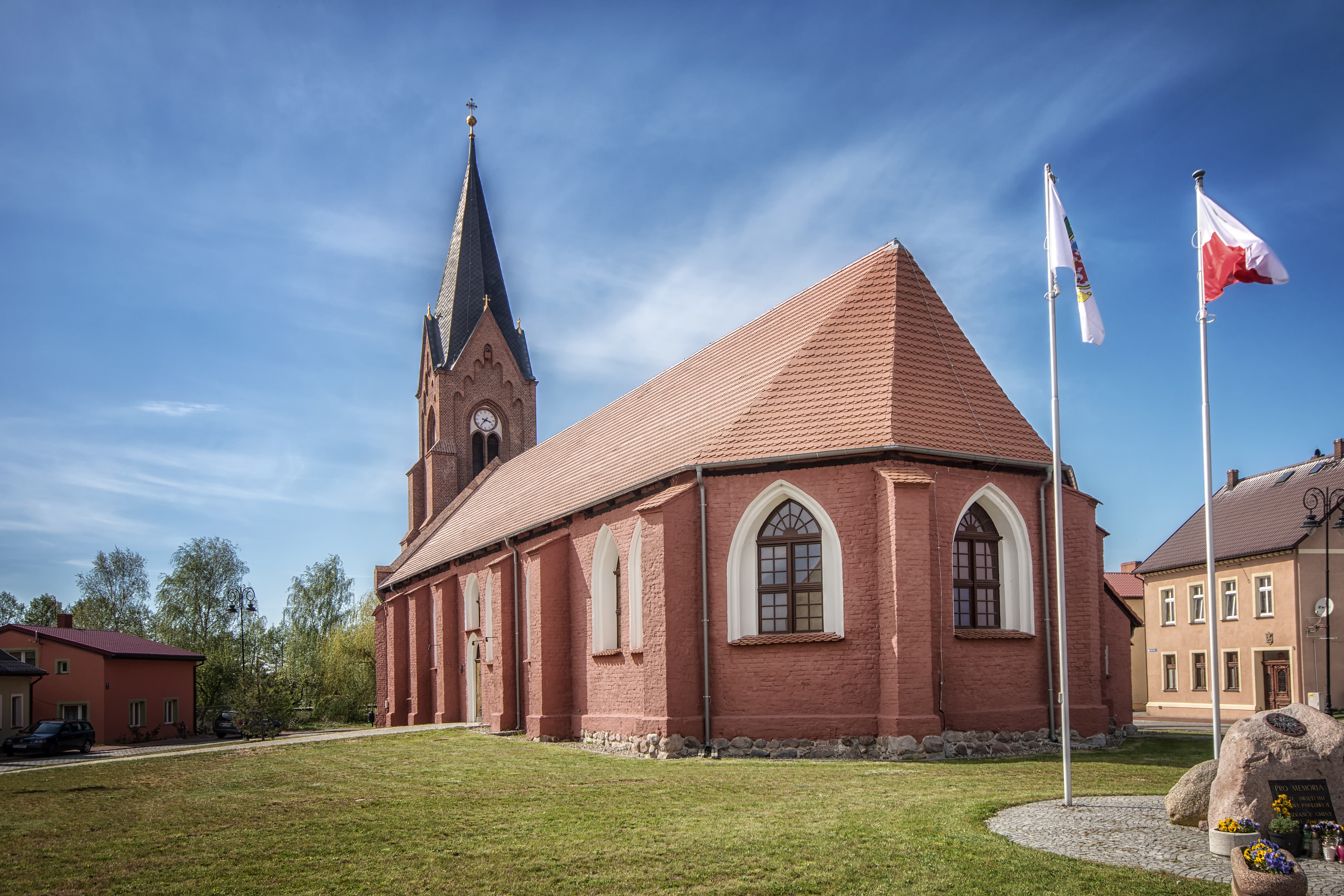
Church of the Assumption

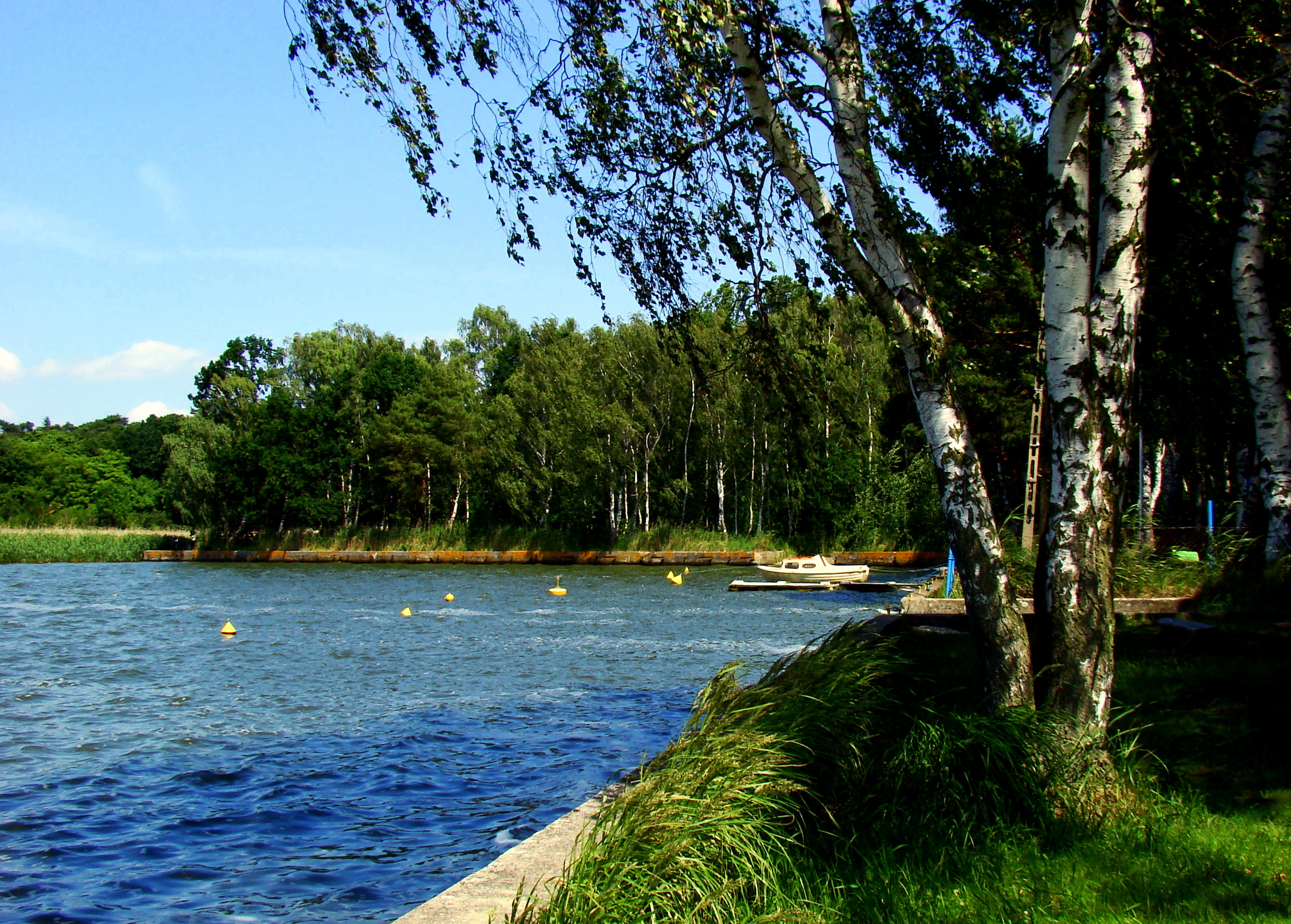
Marina in Podgrodzie

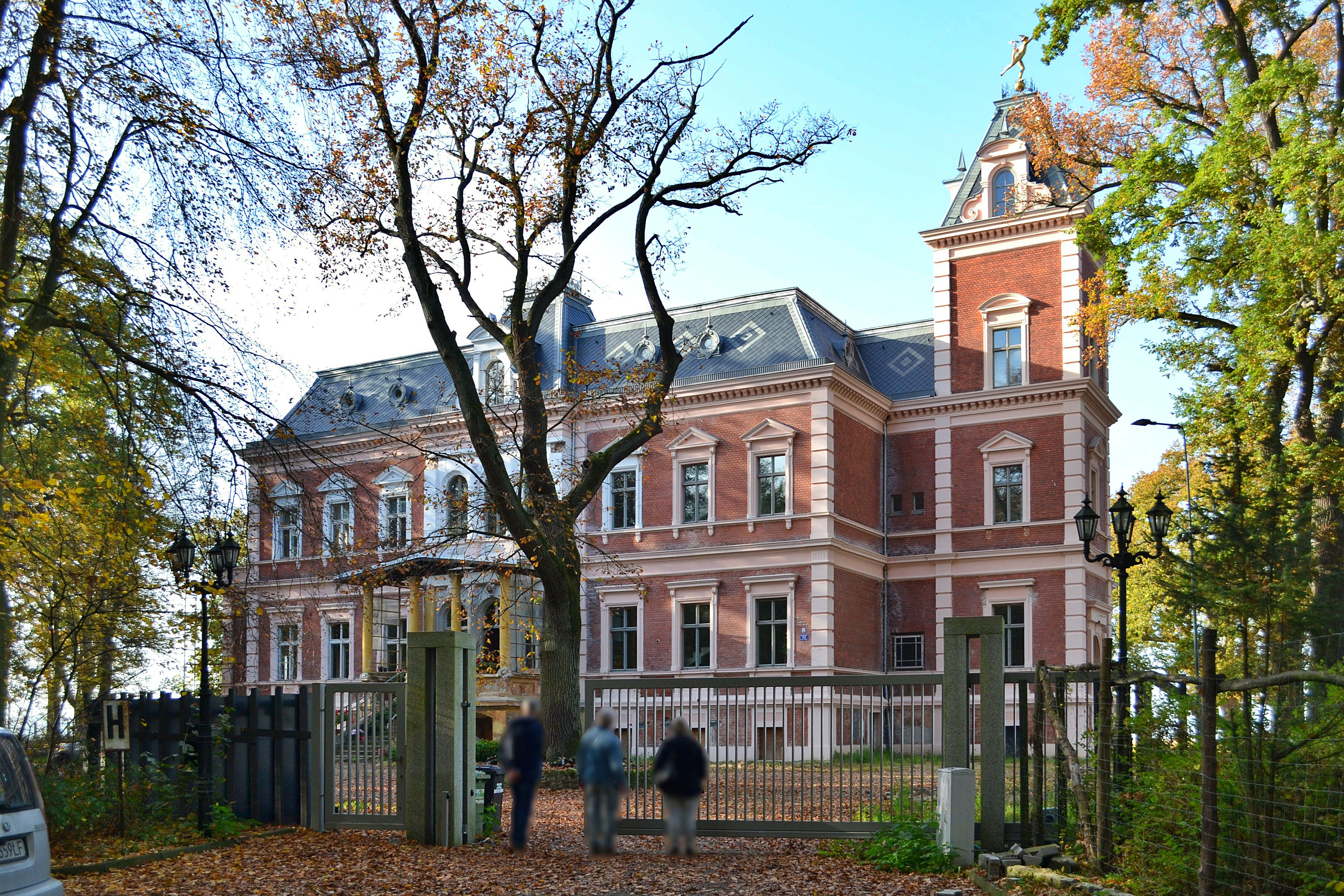
Karszno Palace
