= Szczecin Lagoon Cycle Route =

International circular cycling route around the Szczecin Lagoon

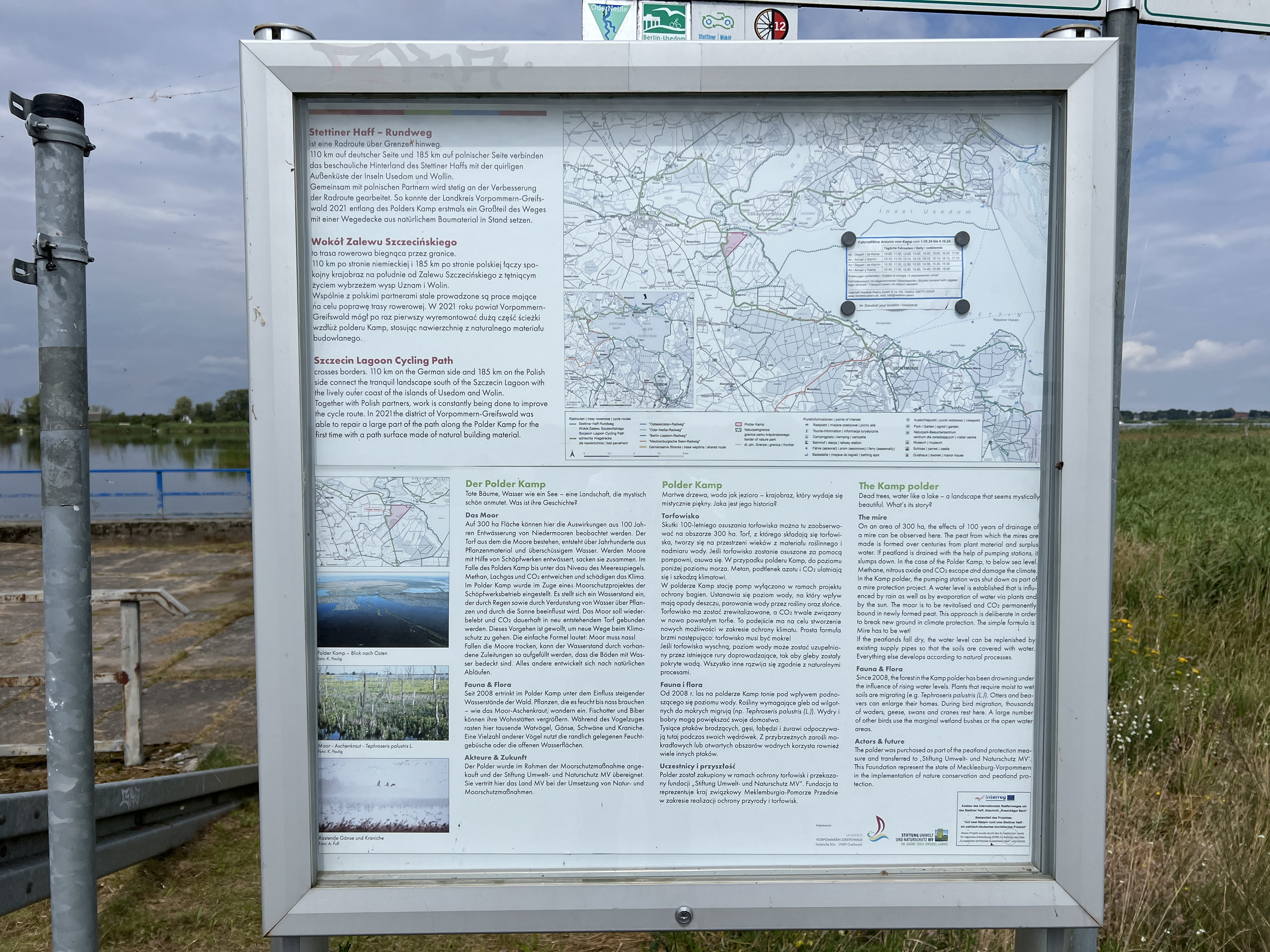
- Information board and trail map
- Length: 296 km (184 mi)
- Location: Poland West Pomeranian Voivodeship; Germany Mecklenburg-Vorpommern
- Trailheads: Szczecin (Ducal Castle) (circular route)
- Use: Cycling
- Surface: asphalt 64%, gravel 23%, cobblestone 5%, concrete slabs 4%, unpaved roads 4%
- Website: rowery.wzp.pl/en/5-pomorze-zachodnie-szczecin-lagoon-cycle-route

Szczecin Lagoon Cycle Route (Polish: Szlak rowerowy Wokół Zalewu Szczecińskiego; German: Stettiner Haff-Rundweg) is an international circular cycle route in Poland (the West Pomeranian Voivodeship) and Germany (Mecklenburg-Vorpommern), running around the Szczecin Lagoon and through the Wkrzańska Forest and the Goleniowska Forest. It was previously described as route R-66.

Depending on the adopted variant, sources have reported different lengths for the route, including 260 km (160 mi) (a 2014 concept for Szczecin’s cycling network; a similar length was also given in a 2015 trip report), 296 km (184 mi) (the cycling route portal of the Marshal’s Office of the West Pomeranian Voivodeship), and 305 km (190 mi) (a list published by the Polish Tourist and Sightseeing Society’s cycling commission; as of 15 March 2022). Tourism services for Mecklenburg-Vorpommern have also reported lengths such as 297 km (185 mi) (split into five stages) and 314.8 km (195.6 mi) (route-planning variant). Promotional materials for West Pomerania (in German) likewise describe the route as an international loop around the Szczecin Lagoon.

== Characteristics ==
The route offers landscapes, nature and monuments around the lower Oder (Odra) estuary and the islands of Usedom and Wolin. Most sections run on cycle paths, unpaved roads and low-traffic paved roads; only some fragments have heavier car traffic. A 2015 press report noted weak signage (especially on the Polish side) and recommended preparing supporting materials (notes and route information) before setting out.

The West Pomeranian cycling portal (variant labelled “Szczecin Lagoon Cycle Route”) gives a distance of 296 km (184 mi), total ascent 971 m (3,186 ft), total descent 978 m (3,209 ft), and a division into seven daily sections of about 36 km (22 mi) to 53 km (33 mi). For this variant, the reported surface composition is: asphalt 64%, gravel 23%, cobblestone 5%, concrete slabs 4%, and unpaved roads 4%. Reported road-traffic types along the route are: cycleways 62%, general traffic 31%, and forest/field roads 7%.

In this variant, the description highlights the shores of Dąbie Lake and the Szczecin Lagoon, numerous marinas, and the possibility of visiting the beech forests of Wolin National Park and an archaeological reserve (Slavic and Viking settlement) in the Wolin area.

Tourism descriptions for Mecklenburg-Vorpommern emphasise the cross-border “loop” nature of the route, including scenic sections such as a start in Ueckermünde with a detour to the town harbour; segments between lagoon beaches and the forests of the Ueckermünde heathland; floodplain meadows near Anklam (described as bird nesting sites); and the Otto Lilienthal Museum in Anklam. They also describe crossing the Zecherin drawbridge to Usedom, then (via Świnoujście) taking a ferry to Wolin and continuing along the cliff coast towards Międzyzdroje. Further highlights include the eastern shore of the lagoon towards Stepnica, and views over the Oder estuary near Szczecin; the final stage is described as running through the Wkrzańska Forest with a ferry crossing over Lake Neuwarp (Nowowarpieński Lagoon).

== Route ==
Szczecin (Ducal Castle) – Tanowo – Trzebież – Nowe Warpno – Altwarp (if the ferry connection is unavailable: variant via Myśliborka and Rieth) – Ueckermünde – Anklam – Usedom – Ahlbeck – Świnoujście (city centre) – Wapnica – Wolin – Stepnica (including via Czarnocin) – Goleniów – Lubczyna – Szczecin (Ducal Castle). In the West Pomeranian portal’s variant, the loop can be shortened by taking a cruise from Trzebież to Kopice (omitting the ride through Szczecin).

== Signage and navigation materials ==
The West Pomeranian cycling portal provides GPX files for the overall route and for individual stages. In the description of the German-side stage (Ueckermünde–Trzebież), signage is described as good on the Anklam–Warsin section; however, Stettiner Haff-Rundweg signs are said to appear only sporadically, and part of the route overlaps with the Oder–Neiße Cycle Route (D-12). A 2015 trip report noted that signage on the German side used Rundweg Stettiner Haff rather than “R-66”. Tourism materials for route planning on the German side remind riders that border crossings are within the Schengen Area and that an identity document should be carried while travelling. The tourism service also notes access by public transport (rail) to, among others, Ueckermünde, Anklam, Ahlbeck and Szczecin.

== Development status ==
A 2021 report by the Polish Tourism Organisation stated that the “route around the Szczecin Lagoon” was then in a planning phase: an alignment had been set and a description and GPX file were available, but the route was not yet signposted.

The Marshal’s Office cycling portal gives a distance of 296 km (184 mi) and notes that the eastern part of the route fully overlaps with the Blue Velo route. In the description of a Blue Velo stage (Modrzewie–Szczecin), a new cycleway section (Modrzewie–Lubczyna–Czarna Łąka–Szczecin-Dąbie) is described as running along flood embankments.

In 2022, local authorities reported the publication of a fold-out bilingual (Polish–German) map of the route (Interreg VA project), showing the route alignment, surface types and cyclist-oriented infrastructure and services (rest areas, shelters, campsites, bicycle repair points). The same communication stated that the route was about 300 km (190 mi), with 163 km (101 mi) on the Polish side (nearly 90 km (56 mi) completed at that time). In the English version of the West Pomeranian portal, some sections are labelled “currently being designed / under construction”. Communications from 2020 to 2022 also pointed to the development of digital tools for cyclists (including an app linked to an online platform) as a continuation of the project work.

== Tourist attractions ==
- Ducal Castle, Szczecin; Bolesław I the Brave Embankment
- Arkona Forest Park
- Jasienica – ruins of an Augustinian monastery
- Nowe Warpno – Nowe Warpno Town Hall; Church of the Assumption of the Blessed Virgin Mary; medieval-origin old town with characteristic timber-framed development (late 18th–early 19th century)
- Riether Werder
- Schloss Ueckermünde
- Ueckermünde Zoo
- ruins of the railway bridge at Karnin (Karnin Lift Bridge)
- Ahlbeck – pier; OstseeTherme
- Golm War Cemetery (off the route)
- Świnoujście – fortifications; lighthouse; breakwaters; seaside district
- Międzyzdroje (off the route) – pier; Wolin National Park bison sanctuary; Kawcza Góra
- Zalesie – museum at former V-3 launch site
- Wapnica – “Turquoise Lake” and Piaskowa Góra
- Wolin – archaeological reserve at Wzgórze Wisielców
- Stepnica – former tavern building; marina; beach
- Goleniów – St Catherine’s Church; Wolin Gate
- Lubczyna – marina and beach on Dąbie Lake
- Szczecin-Dąbie – St Mary’s Church; fragment of city walls
- Anklam – Otto Lilienthal Museum (off some route variants)

=== Ferries and engineering structures ===
Tourism descriptions highlight, among others, the following crossings and structures along the route: the Zecherin drawbridge (Zecherin) on the road to Usedom; ferry crossings between Usedom and Wolin near Świnoujście; and a ferry crossing over Lake Neuwarp (Nowowarpieński Lagoon) near Nowe Warpno.

== See also ==
- Wolin National Park
