= Karsibór =

Island in Poland

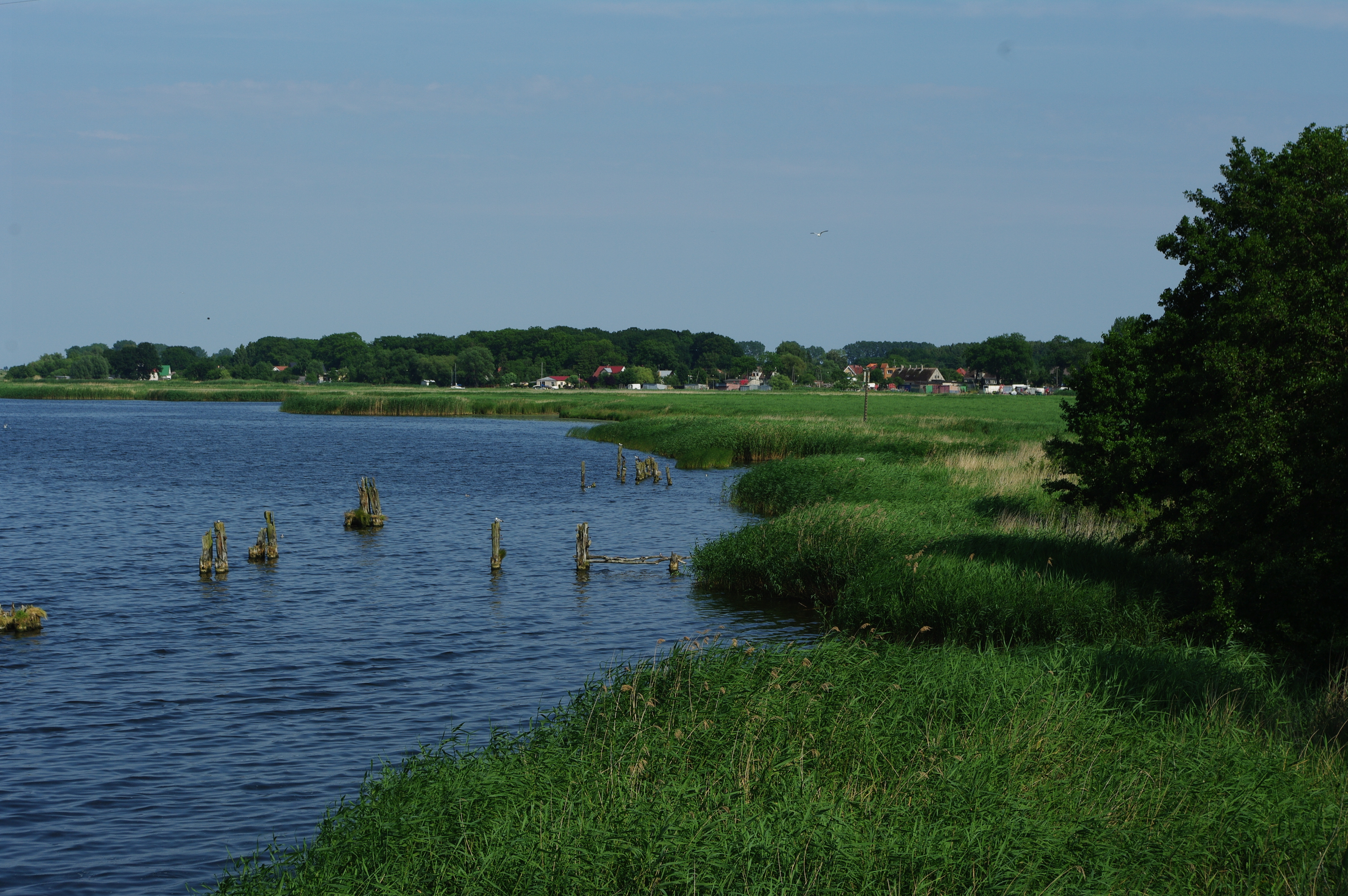
- Karsibór, view from Piastowski Bridge

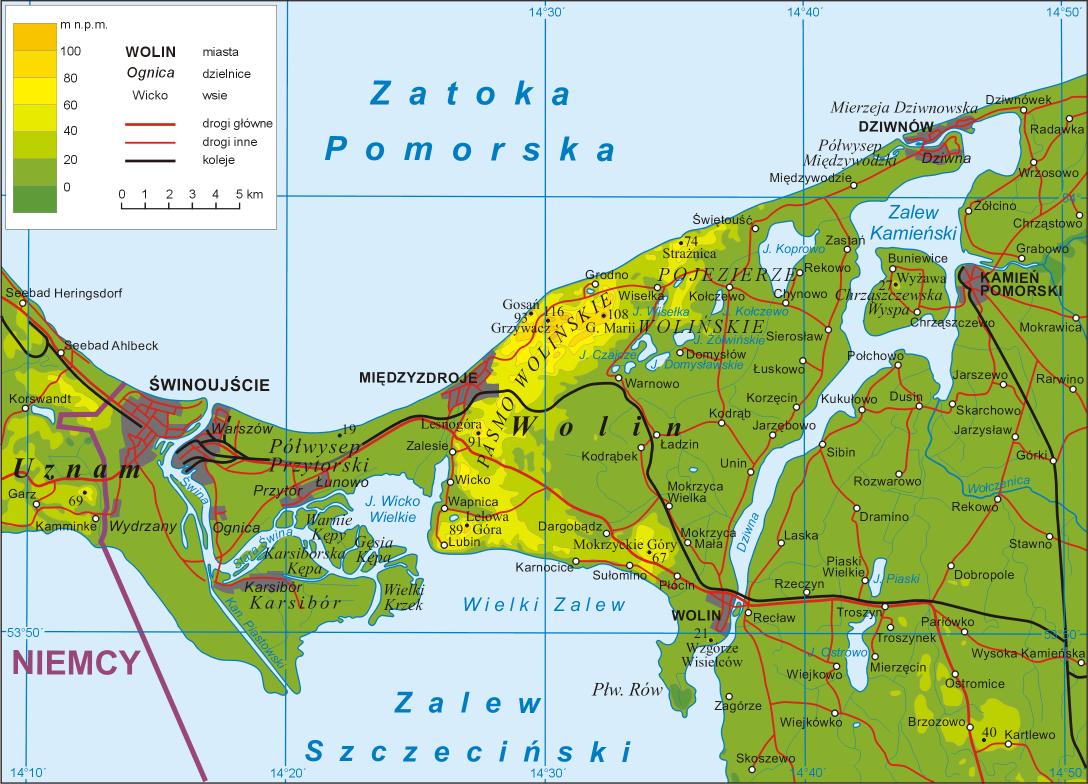
- Map of the Wolin and Karsibór islands

Geography
- Location: Szczecin Lagoon
- Coordinates: 53.846°N 14.330°E
- Area: 14 km^{2} (5.4 sq mi)

Administration
- Poland
- Voivodeship: West Pomeranian Voivodeship
- County: Świnoujście (city county)

Demographics
- Population: 703 (2010)
- Ethnic groups: Poles

Karsibór (German: Kaseburg or Caseburg) is an island in the Szczecin Lagoon, Poland, which was created by the cutting of the Piast Canal which separated it from the island of Usedom. The island was named after its largest village (now district of the town of Świnoujście).

In 1880, the Kaiserfahrt (Piast Canal) channel was opened providing a water route with a depth of 10 metres (33 ft) connecting the lagoon with the Baltic Sea bypassing the eastern part of the Świna arm (Old Świna) of the Oder River, allowing large ships quicker and safer enter the lagoon and the seaport of Szczecin than on the natural river. The canal, approximately 12 km (7.5 mi) long and 10 metres (33 ft) deep, was dug by the German Empire between 1874 and 1880, during the reign of the first Kaiser Wilhelm (1797–1888) after whom it was named.

After the defeat of Germany in World War II, under the terms of the Potsdam Agreement, in 1945 the region became part of Poland, which renamed the canal after the Piast dynasty.

There is a memorial to the British pilots of the No. 617 Squadron RAF, who were shot down by Germany in April 1945.

== Images ==
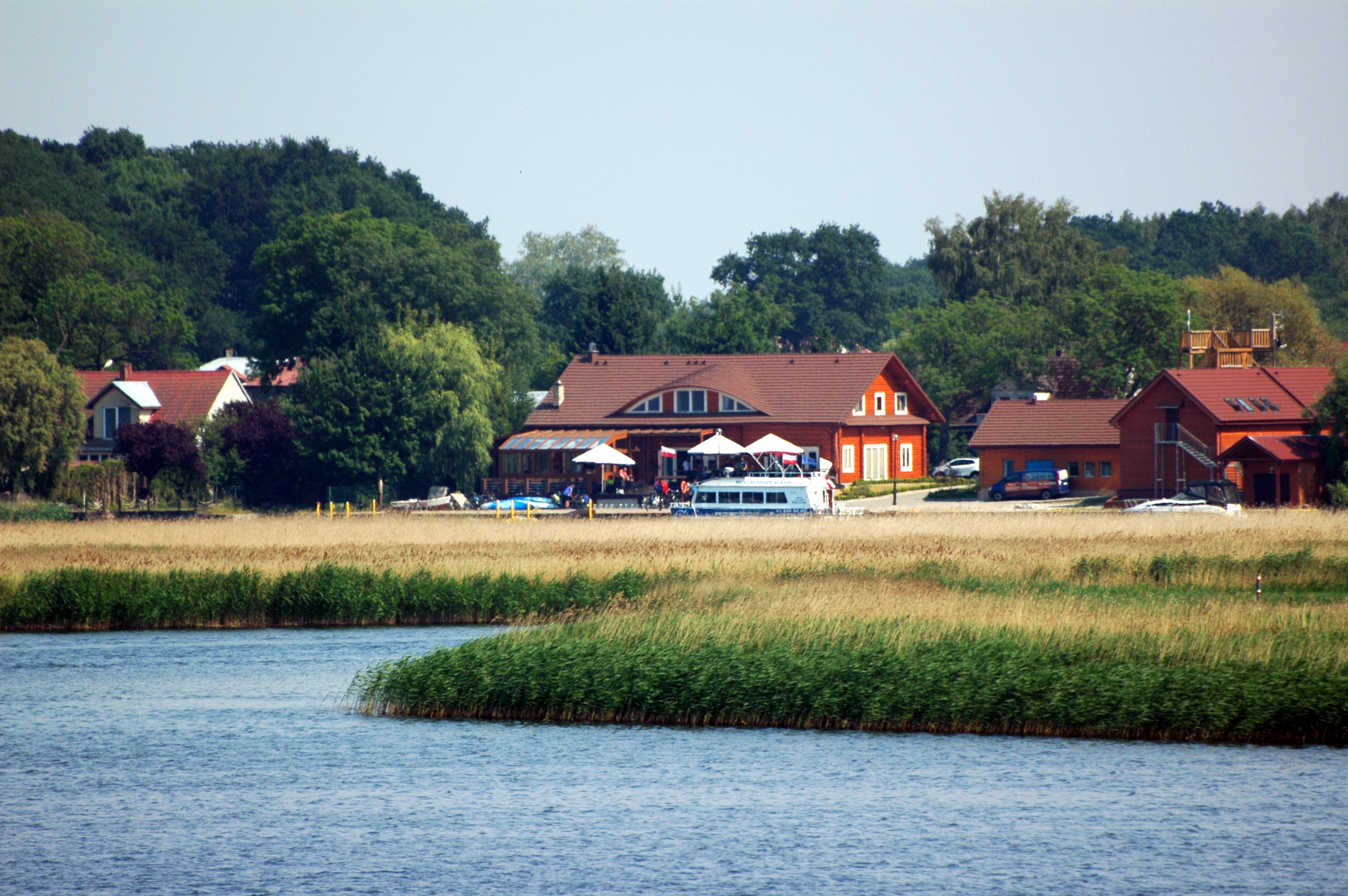
Marina in Karsibór

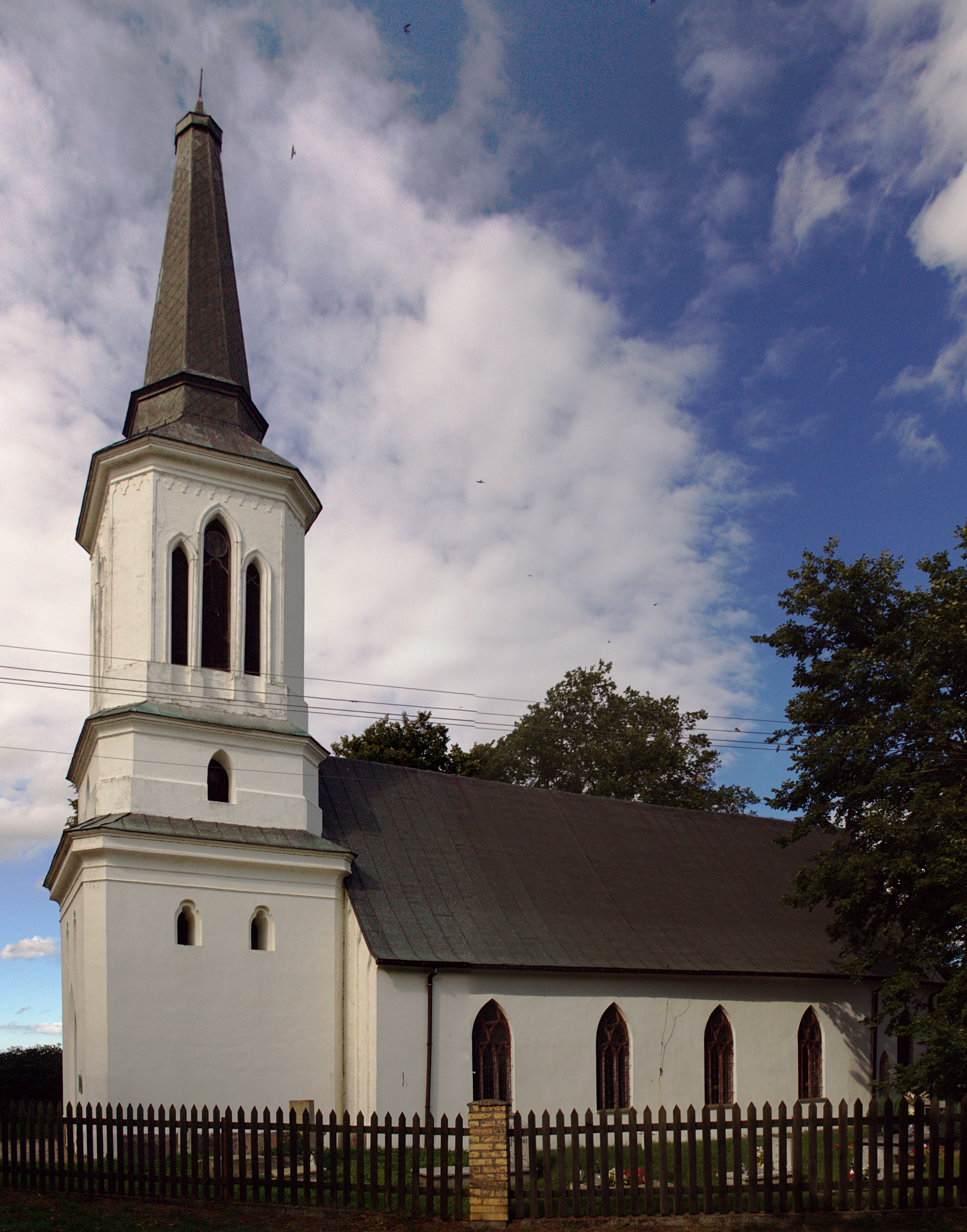
Gothic Immaculate Conception church

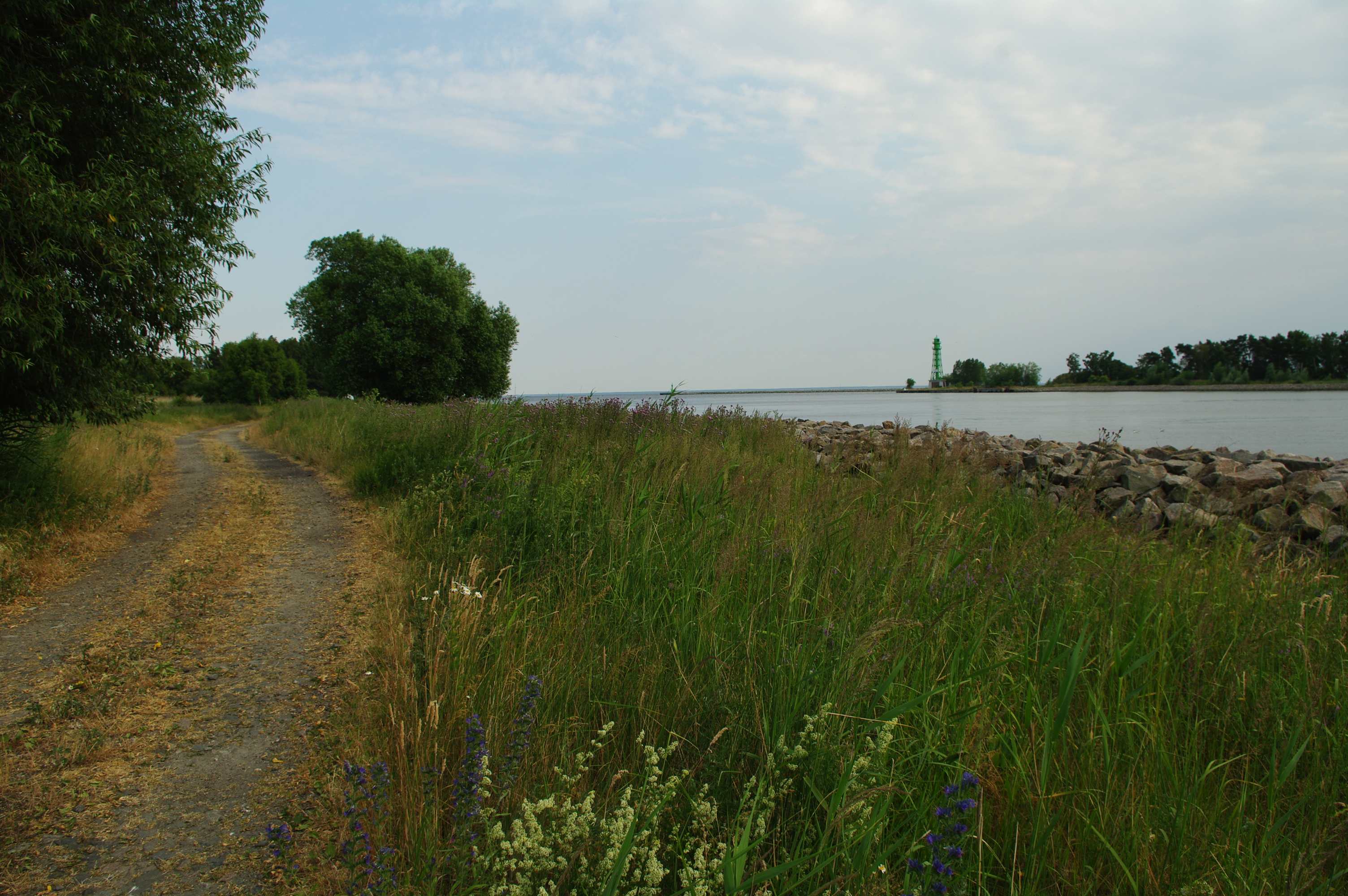
Piast canal

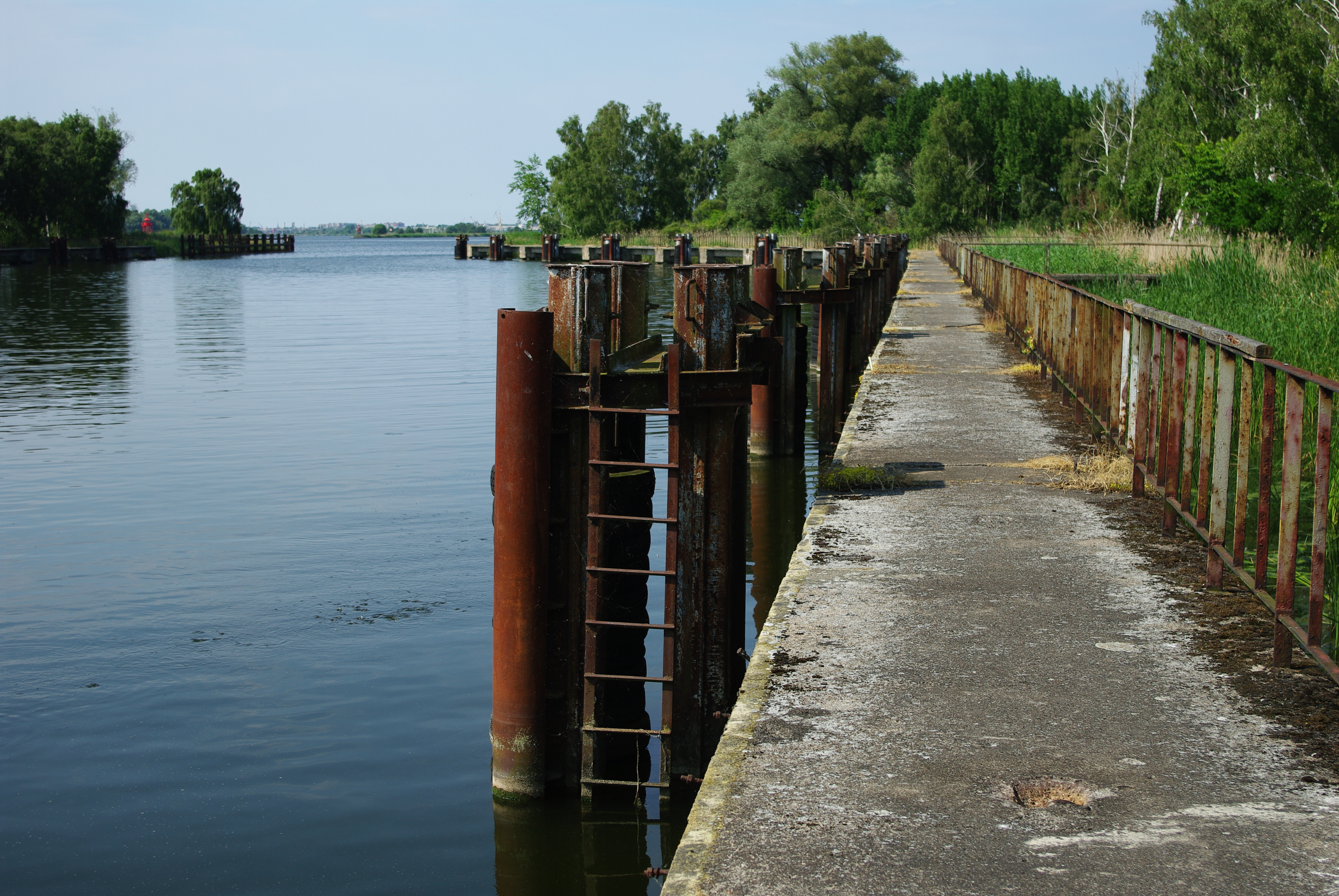
U-Boot Harbour
