= Szczecin Lagoon =

Estuary on the Polish-German border

Coordinates: 53°48′16″N 14°08′25″E

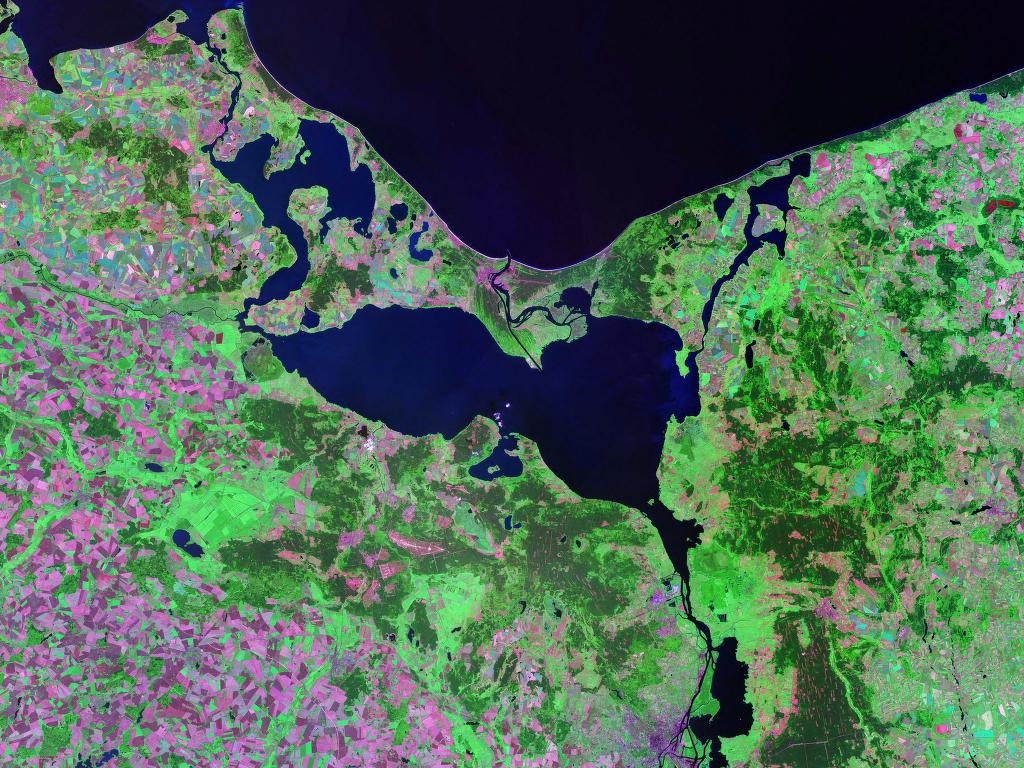
Oder Lagoon - Landsat satellite photo (circa 2000)

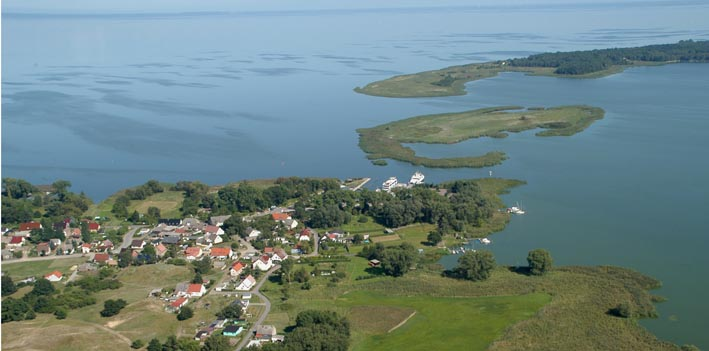
The German fishing village of Altwarp on the Lagoon

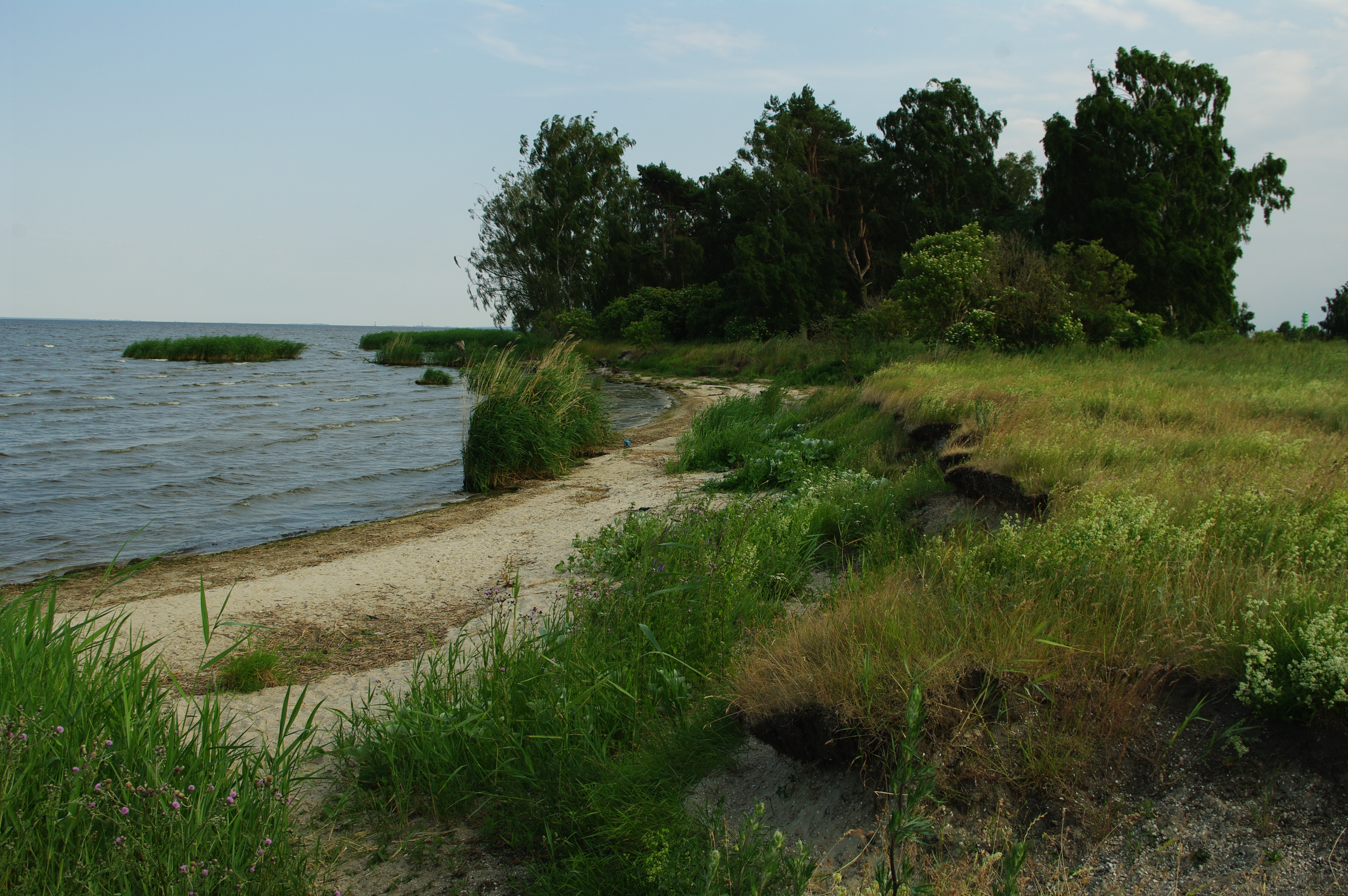
Szczecin Lagoon, view from Polish island of Karsibór

Szczecin Lagoon (Polish: Zalew Szczeciński, German: Stettiner Haff), also known as Oder Lagoon (German: Oderhaff), and Pomeranian Lagoon (German: Pommersches Haff), is a lagoon in the Oder estuary, shared by Germany and Poland. It is separated from the Pomeranian Bay of the Baltic Sea by the islands of Usedom and Wolin. The lagoon is subdivided into the Kleines Haff (Polish: Mały Zalew, "small lagoon") in the West and the Wielki Zalew (German: Großes Haff, "great lagoon") in the East. An ambiguous historical German name was Frisches Haff, which later exclusively referred to the Vistula Lagoon.

== Geography ==
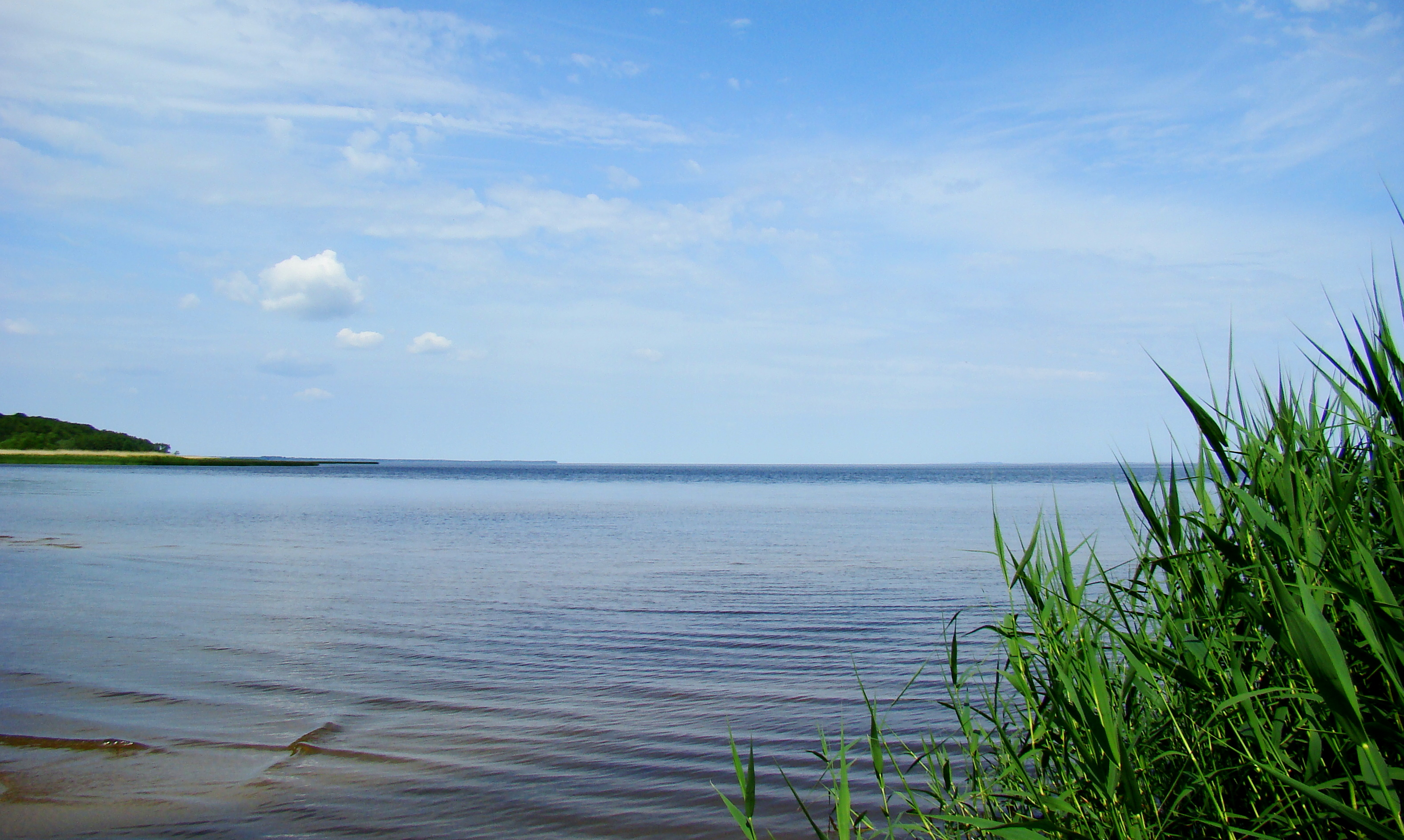
The lagoon

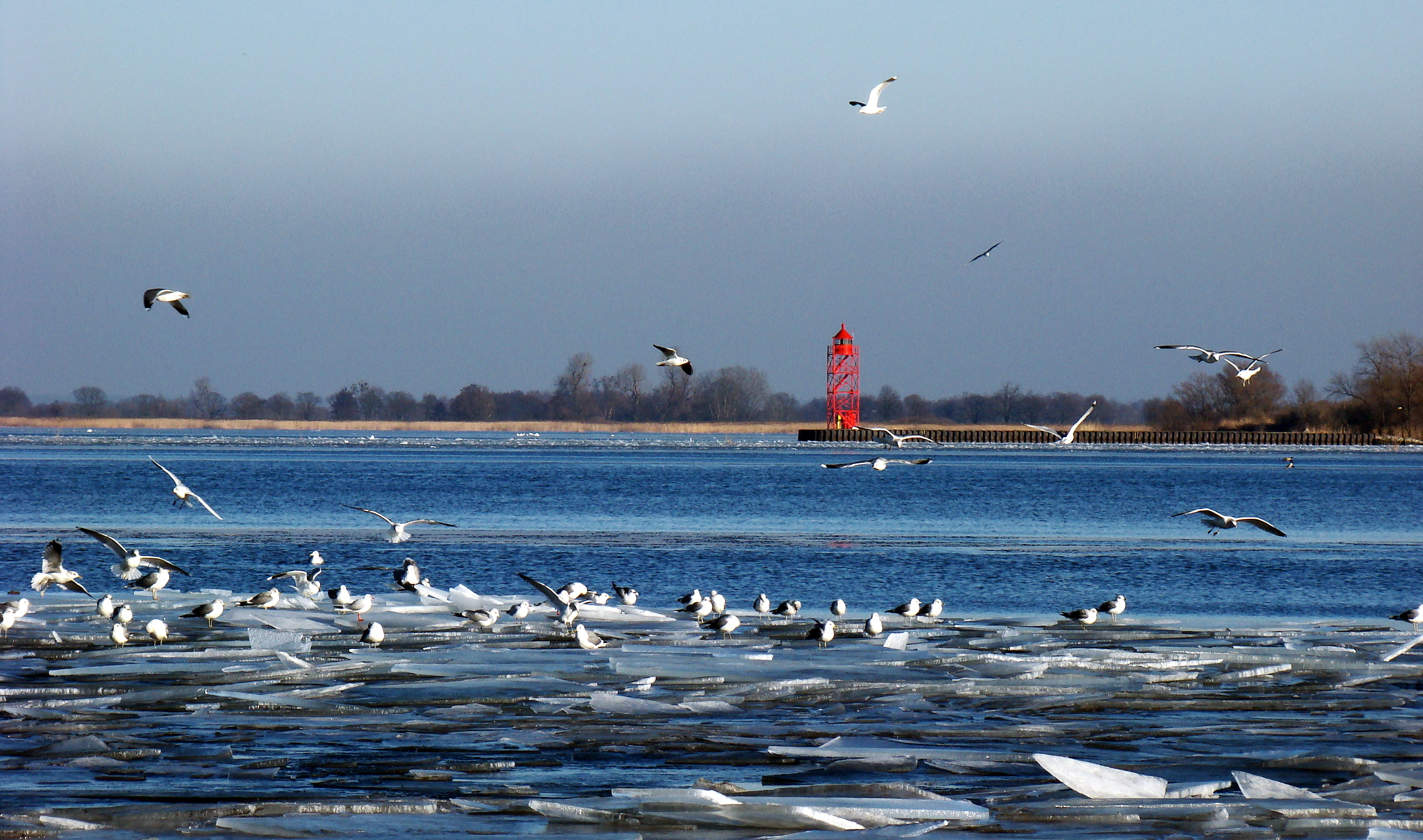
Seagulls on the lagoon in winter

From the South, the lagoon is fed by several arms of the Oder river and smaller rivers like Ziese, Peene, Zarow, Uecker, and Ina. In the North, the lagoon is connected to the Baltic Sea's Bay of Pomerania with the three straits Peenestrom, Świna and Dziwna, which divide the mainland and the islands of Usedom and Wolin.

The lagoon covers an area of 687 km^{2}, its natural depth is an average 3.8 metres, and 8.5 metres at maximum. The depth of shipping channels however can exceed 10.5 metres. Thus, the lagoon holds about 2.58 km^{3} of water. The annual average water temperature is 11 °C.

The Oder river and its confluences are responsible for 94% of the water loads discharged into the lagoon, amounting to an average annual 17 km^{3} or 540 m^{3} per second. All other confluences contribute a combined annual 1 km^{3}. Since no reliable data for an inflow from the Baltic Sea exist, the combined inflow is an estimated 18 km^{3} from a catchment area of 129,000 km^{2}, residing in the lagoon for an average 55 days before being discharged into the Pomeranian Bay. The nutrients thereby transported into the lagoon have made it hyper(eu)trophic to eutrophic. The straits Peenestrom, Świna and Dziwna are responsible for 17%, 69%, and 14% of the discharge, respectively.

The average salinity is between 0.5 and 2 grams of salt per kilogram of water (approximately equivalent to 0.5 and 2 parts per thousand [ppt]). Occasionally northerly winds reverse the direction of the Świna, admitting sea water from the Baltic Sea into the lagoon, raising the local salinity to 6 ppt.

=== Towns around the Lagoon ===
- Szczecin (Poland)
- Świnoujście (Poland)
- Police (Poland)
- Ueckermünde (Germany)
- Wolin (Poland)
- Usedom (Germany)
- Nowe Warpno (Poland)

== History ==
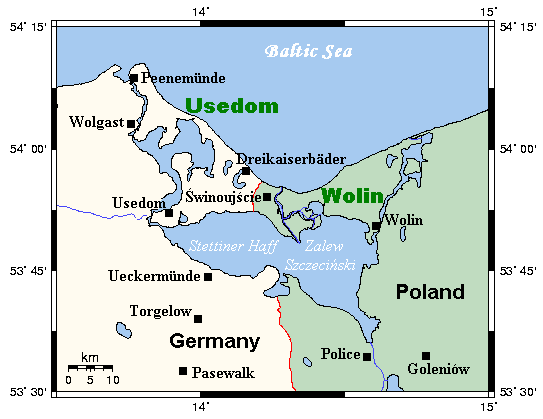
Map of the Szczecin Lagoon

In the 10th century, the emerging Polish state strove for the area, but likely did not succeed with establishing control. Following Poland's fragmentation, it formed part of the Duchy of Pomerania, which became part of the Holy Roman Empire of the German Nation. In the 17th century, it was ruled by Sweden, but statyed part of Germany. Later on, it gradually passed to the Kingdom of Prussia in the 18th and 19th century, and from 1871 was part of reunified Germany. In 1880, the Kaiserfahrt ("Emperor's passage") channel on Usedom was opened, a water route with a depth of 10 metres connecting the lagoon with the Baltic Sea by bypassing the eastern part of the Swine, allowing large ships to enter the lagoon and the seaport of Stettin quicker and safer.

The canal, approximately 12 km long and 10 metres deep, was dug by the German Empire between 1874 and 1880, during the reign of the first Kaiser Wilhelm (1797–1888) after whom it was named. Also, the work resulted in a new island named Kaseburg (Karsibór) being cut off from Usedom.

After the defeat of Nazi Germany in World War II in 1945, the eastern part of the lagoon became part of Poland, while the western part became part of East Germany. The Kaiserfahrt was renamed Piast Canal, after the Polish Piast dynasty, which first included the region to Poland in the 10th century.

By 2022, a cycle route had been partly constructed around the lagoon.

The German–Polish border also divides the Nowe Warpno Lake near Rieth, Luckow.

== Economy ==
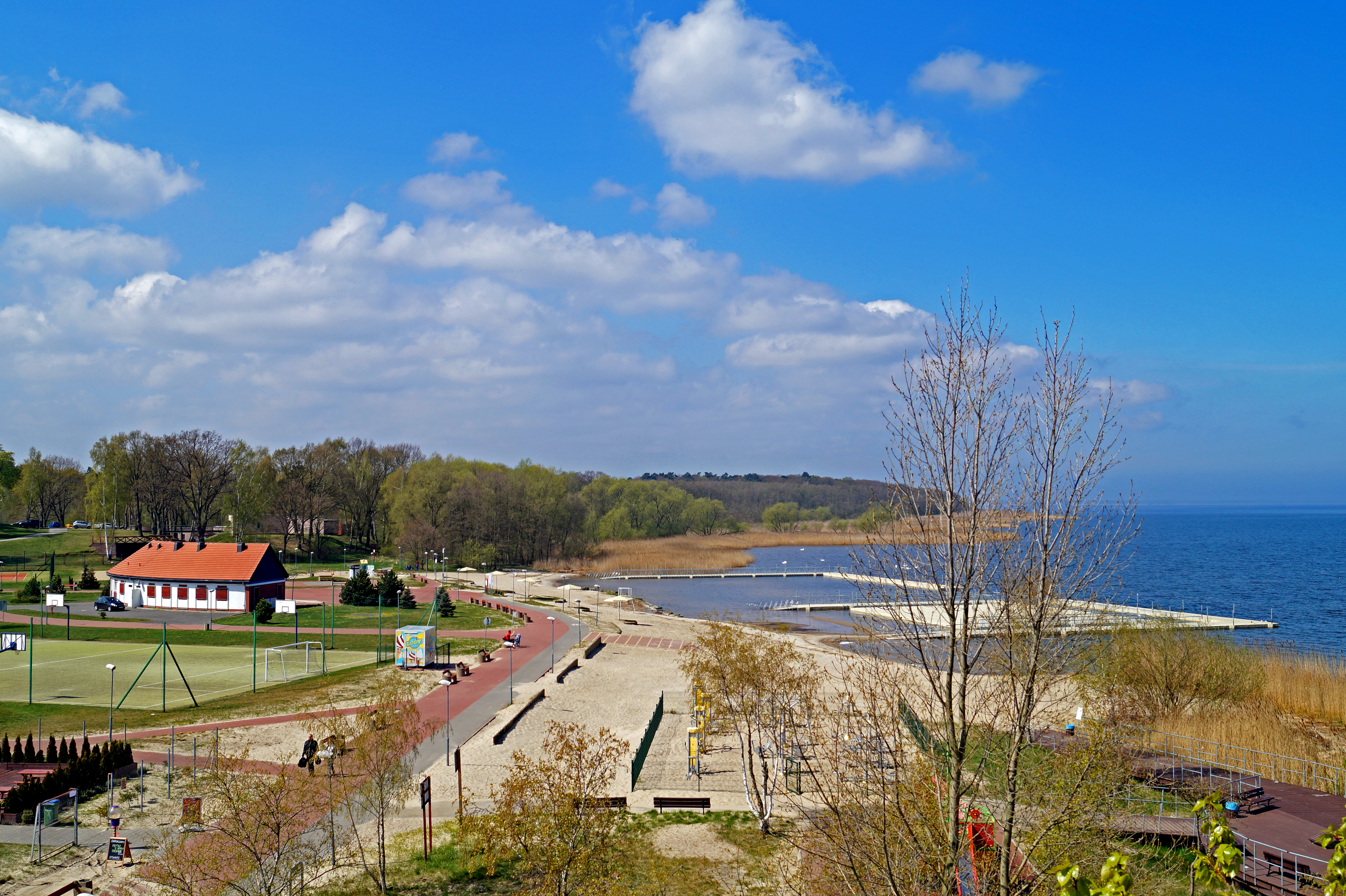
Beach in Trzebież near Police, Poland

The lagoon has served as an important fishing grounds for centuries, as a major transportation pathway since the 18th century, and as a tourist destination since the 20th century.

Heringsdorf Airport on Usedom island is located on the shores of the lagoon.

== Nature ==
The southern shore of the lagoon belongs to the Am Stettiner Haff Nature Park, its northern shore and the island of Usedom to the Usedom Island Nature Park. To the west is the Anklamer Stadtbruch Nature Reserve and, within it, the Anklamer Torfmoor, a protected wetland which is renaturalising after being used for peat extraction.

== See also ==
- Curonian Lagoon
- Szczecin Lagoon Cycle Route
- Vistula Lagoon
