= Lubczyna, West Pomeranian Voivodeship =

Lubczyna
- Village
- Location within Poland
- Coordinates: 53°30′13″N 14°42′39″E
- Country: Poland
- Voivodeship: West Pomeranian
- County: Goleniów
- Gmina: Goleniów
- Population: 480

Lubczyna [lupˈt͡ʂɨna] (German: Lübzin) is a village in the administrative district of Gmina Goleniów, within Goleniów County, West Pomeranian Voivodeship, in north-western Poland. It lies approximately 9 km (6 mi) south-west of Goleniów and 13 km (8 mi) north-east of the regional capital Szczecin.

For the history of the region, see History of Pomerania.

The village has a population of 480.
